= List of ancient Epirotes =

Mainland Greece in antiquity.

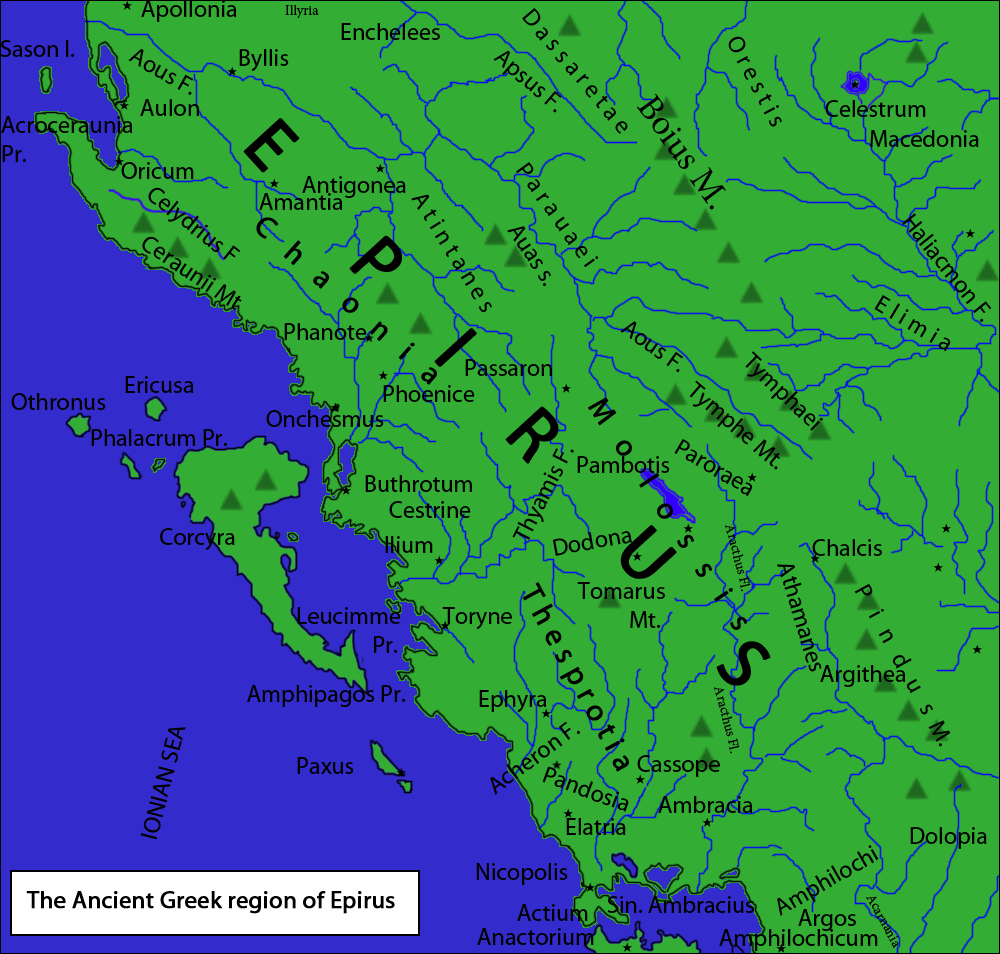
Districts of Ancient Epirus, Chaonia, Molossia & Thesprotia

This list refers to inhabitants of Ancient Epirus.

== Mythology ==
- Ambrax, Ambracia
- Chaon
- Epirus, a Theban, died in Epirus.
- Callidice of Thesprotia, queen of Thesprotians and wife of Odysseus
- Molossus
- Pandrasus, a Greek king in medieval British legend
- Thesprotus
- Tyrimmas, King of Dodona; his daughter Euippe made a child with Odysseus

== Aeacid dynasty ==
- Neoptolemus (Pyrrhus)
- Molossus son of Neoptolemus and Andromache
- Alcon the Molossian (6th century BC) suitor of Agariste of Sicyon
- Admetus of Epirus (c. 490 - 470 BC)
- Tharypus
- Alcetas I (c. 385 – 370)
- Neoptolemos I
- Arybbas (361/360-? ВС)
- Alexander I (?-330/329 BC)
- Aeacides
- Alcetas II (313–307 ВС)
- Beroea of Epirus
- Pyrrhus I (307-302 BC)
- Neoptolemos II (302-295 ВС)
- Alexander II of Epirus (272-255 ВС)
- Olympias II of Epirus
- Pyrrhus II
- Ptolemy of Epirus (238-231 ВС)
- Deidamia (?-231 BC)

== Tribal Kings ==
- Oroedus, king of the Parauaioi
- Antiochus (King), king of the Orestae

== Nobles ==
- Sabylinthus, regent of king Tharrhypas
- Kleomachos the Atintanian

== In Macedon ==
- Amyntas of Tymphaia
- Attalus of Tymphaia
- Myrtale (Olympias) mother of Alexander the Great
- Alexander the Great through his mother Olympias
- Cleopatra of Macedon
- Leonidas first teacher of Alexander the Great
- Arybbas (somatophylax)
- Polyperchon general and regent (of Tymphaia)
- Neoptolemus (general)
- Polemon of Tymphaia
- Pyrrhus of Epirus basileus of Macedon (288-285 BC (divided with Lysimachus), 274-272 BC)
- Simmias of Tymphaia

== Athletes ==
- Sophron of Ambracia Stadion, Olympics 432 BC
- Arybbas of Epirus Tethrippon Olympics 344 BC
- Tlasimachus of Ambracia Tethrippon and Synoris Olympics 296 BC
- Simacus (son of Phalacrion) Thesprotian 3rd-2nd century BC Pancratiast, Epidauria (fined)
- Alcemachus (son of Charops) Diaulos (~400-metre race) Panathenaics 194/3 BC
- -tos (son of Lysias) Chaonian, Pale (wrestling) Panathenaics 194/193 BC
- Antipater of Epirus Stadion Olympics 136 BC
- Andromachus of Ambracia Stadion Olympics 60 BC

== Artists ==
- Epigonus of Ambracia 6th-century BC musician, inventor epigonion instrument
- Nicocles of Ambracia auletes
- Hippasus of Ambracia tragic actor hypocrites

== Priests ==
- Silanus of Ambracia seer in Xenophon's Anabasis
- Pelignas chef, sacrificer sent by Olympias to Alexander

== Physicians ==
- Philagrius of Epirus 3rd century AD

== Theorodokoi ==
- Molossian Tharyps - Chaonian Doropsos - Thesprotian Petoas, Simakos - Admatos from Poionos - Skepas, Aristodamos from Cassopea - Dioszotos from Pandosia - Schidas of Artichia -Phorbadas, Timogenes of Ambracia -Geron son of Aristodamos (Epidauros 365 BC)

== Writers ==
- Philetas of Dodona Tragoedus c. 400 - 375
- Epicrates of Ambracia comic poet 4th century BC
- Pyrrhus of Epirus memoirs and books on military, mechanics and siegecraft
- Nicolaus of Epirus Tragoedus winner in Delian festival 279 BC
- Glaucus of Nicopolis epigrammatic poet of Greek Anthology
