= Oridas =

King of king of the Parauaeans

- King of the Parauaeans
- Reign: mid-5th century BC
- Born: Όροιδος
- House: Parauaeans
- Religion: Ancient Greek religion

Oridas was a king of the Parauaeans in Epirus.

It is mentioned that he reigned during the time when Tharrhypas ruled over the Molossians with Sabylinthus as his regent. His kingdom was located in the northern Pindus region around the Aous River (current Vjosa). It is noted that he participated in the Greco-Persian Wars and was an ally of the Spartans.

== See also ==
- Epirus
- Classical Greece
- Greco-Persian Wars

== Bibliography ==
- Panagiotis Stam. Aravantinos, Chronography of Epirus: covering in sequence the events in neighboring Greek and Illyrian lands from the year of salvation until 1854. From the Printing House of S. K. Vlastos, in Athens 1856.
- Thucydides, Book II
