= Atintanians =

People of ancient Epirus or Illyria

Atintanes or Atintanians (Greek: Ἀτιντᾶνες, Atintánes or Ἀτιντᾶνιοι, Atintánioi; Latin: Atintanii) was an ancient tribe that dwelled in the borderlands between Epirus and Illyria, in an inland region which was called Atintania. They have been described as either an Epirote tribe that belonged to the northwestern Greek group, or as an Illyrian tribe. They were occasionally subordinate to the Molossians.

== Name ==
The suffix -anes is quite typical in north-western Doric Greek and is found in several ethnonyms in Epirus (Arktanes, Athamanes, Talaianes etc.) but is also found in other Greek regions apart from Epirus. A. J. Toynbee argues that the suffix -anes perhaps suggests that the name Atintanes may have been of Greek origin. He also states that they gave the Greeks their name for the Titanes, a race of giants in mythology. Toynbee has linked their name to the tribal ethnikon Tyntenoi attested in coinage and inscriptions, while N.G.L Hammond has argued that it is linked to the Illyrian Atintani as according to him Tyntenoi is an Ionic form of Atintani. The ending -anes in Doric Greek (-enes in Ionic) is a typical feature in the name of various Doric tribes that participated in the migrations of the Greek Dark Ages (1100-800 B.C.) with many of them originating from Epirus.

== Language ==
According to Filos (2017), there is an overall consensus in scholarship that the Greek-speaking population of Epirus, including the Atintanes, spoke a Northwestern Doric variety similar to that spoken by several neighbouring peoples of central and western Greece. Papamichail (2020) states that a number of variation existed in the speech of those tribes nevertheless their language was based on Doric Greek. N. G. L. Hammond (1977), who proposed the existence of two distinct homonymous tribes – the Epirotic Atintanes and the Illyrian Atintani, stated that the Epirotic Atintanes spoke Greek at least from the time of the Dorian invasion as the rest of the Doric tribes that share the common suffix -anes in their name. Marjeta Šašel Kos (2005) has argued that the Atintanes spoke a language similar to other southern Illyrian tribes which acquired a certain degree of Hellenization through contact with their Greek neighbours, she also argued (2002) that they were conceivably closely associated in terms of language with those tribes.

== Ancient sources ==
The Atintanes are mentioned in classical antiquity by Thucydides (2.80.6), Pseudo-Skylax (26), Pseudo-Aristotle (Mir. 833a 9), Lycophron (Alexandra 1042–1046), Polybius (2.5; 11.11; 7.9.13), Strabo (7.7.8 Baladié), Livy (27.30.13; 29.12.13; 45.30.7), Appian (Illyrike 7–8), Polyaenus (4.11.4), Stephanus of Byzantium (s.v. Ἀτιντάνία) and on a 4th-century B.C. inscription from Dodona (SGDI 1336). They are reported on the above ancient sources in the historical context of the Peloponnesian War, the Roman-Illyrian Wars, the first Roman-Macedonian War, and the 167 BC Roman settlement of Macedonia.

Thucydides (5th century BC), describing the Acarnanian campaign of 429 B.C., lists the Epirote forces; among them the Atintantes, as well as the Chaones, Thesprotians, Molossians, Paravaii, and Orestae, as "barbarians" living north-west from the Greek lands. They are listed along with the Molossians under the same commander, one Sabylinthos. Thucydides depicts a clear distinction between the Hellenic contingents and the barbarian forces, while Macedonian troops are mentioned immediately after the list of the barbarian forces. It has been suggested that the Atintanes are mentioned as "barbarians" not in the sense that their culture, customs or behavior were in diametrical opposition to Greek norms but rather because of their seemingly more primitive way of life marked them as "failed Greeks". The Periplus of Pseudo-Scylax (4th century BC) locates the Atintanes inland in contact with the Amantes and the Chaonians to their west and the area of Idonia (by some authors interpreted as Dodonia) to their south. The poem Alexandra by Lycophron (3rd century BC) locates the land of the Atintanes near the city of Amantia, which corresponds to the hinterland of Apollonia. Strabo (1st century BC – 1st century AD) based on Hecateus' account (6th century BC) listed them among the fourteen Epirote tribes, drawing a border between them and the Illyrians to the north.

According to Livy (1st century BC – 1st century AD) Atintania formed part of Upper Macedonia in terms of Roman administration. Upper Macedonia was located next to Illyria and Epirus, however part of Atinania was certainly found inside Epirus. Appian (2nd century AD) is the only ancient author that specifically refers to the tribe of the Atintani (not Atintanes) using the ethnonym "Illyrian". Hatzopoulos states that this appears in reference to their political situation due to their annexation by Illyrian rulers as already explained by P. Cabanes (1986). Šašel Kos (2005) has argued that Appian may be in agreement with Pseudo-Scylax, who included the Atintanes among the Illyrian peoples, barbarians, located to the north of Chaonia. In the lexicon "Ethnika" of Stephanus of Byzantium (6th century AD), Atintania appears as a region of Macedonia, named after Atintan, a son of Makednos in the version of Lycaon. The tradition of an eponymous Atintan, as the son of Makednos, was probably created during the reign of Philip V of Macedon (238–179 BC) in order to tighten the connection between the Macedonian authorities and Atintanians.

== Identity and location ==
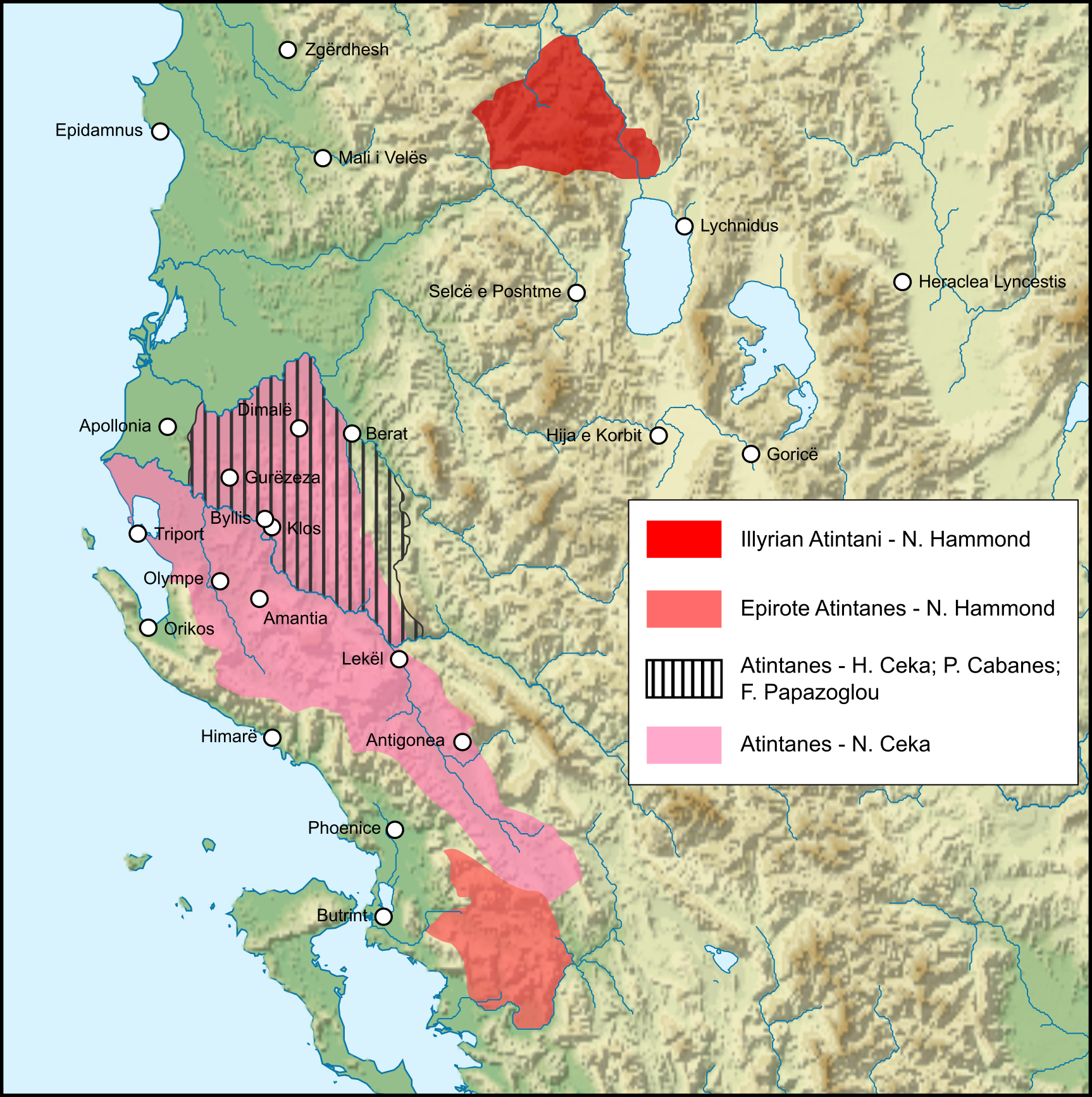
The location of the Atintanians according to N.G.L. Hammond, H. Ceka, P. Cabanes, F. Papazoglou and N. Ceka.

There is no consensus in current scholarship on the origin and precise location of the Atintanes. Modern scholarship mentions the Atintanes either as one of the various Epirote tribes or in connection with the Illyrians. They also appear sometimes as Epirotes and other times as Macedonians, based on which neighbouring state gained control of their area.

In the early 20th century, M. Holleaux sketched Atintania on the middle valley of the Aoos. P. Lévêque located the Atintanes on the middle valley of the Aoos similarly to Holleaux, but he also included the valley of the Drino. A. J. Toynbee located the Atintanes in Epirus, between the Chaonians and the Parauaioi; according to him they were an authentic Epirote people. H. Kreissig (1984) stressed that they were among the Epirote tribes in contrast to the Illyrian Parthini. Martin Nilsson (1986) considers them as an Epirote tribe of [ancient] north-western Greece.

F. Papazoglou and Pierre Cabanes stated that there was only one tribe with the name Atintanians and that the area they inhabited was located in the mountain ranges between the Aous (Vjosë) and the Apsus (Osum) rivers. Cabanes (1988) located Atintania in a region between Byllis and Dassaretis, without the Drino valley, and considered them the southernmost Illyrian people, on the border with Epirus.

According to M.B. Hatzopoulos, the Atintanes, together with the Chaonians constitute the northernmost Epirote community. Hatzopoulos considers that to their north, and between them and the Parthini, Taulantians and the (Illyrian) Dassaretii, existed a mixed zone; though part of Illyria, according to him it was a cultural extension of Greek speaking Epirus. C. Habicht (1995) considered Atintania an Illyrian region. S. Thiry (2001) listed the Atintanes among the Epirotes. T. J. Winnifrith (2002) associated the diverse positions of Atintanes reported in ancient accounts with peaceful transhumans activity, but he also stated that two tribes with a similar name may have existed. He also classifies the Atitanians among the Epirote tribes. Sasel Kos (2002) included the Atintanians among the most outstanding Illyrian peoples who conceivably were closely related with each other in terms of culture, institutions and language. She placed them somewhere in the hinterland of Epidamnus and south of it though she argued that the location of the Atintanians is not certain. M.P. Castiglioni (2003) considered that the area suggested by Cabanes would seem in accordance with the data from Lycophron, and for a more in-depth analysis on the location she referred the reader to Hatzopoulos (1993). The collective work Index du bulletin épigraphique, 1987 - 2001 (2005) published by the Association des études grecques and Universite de Paris IV, Sorbonne classifies Atintantes as an Epirote tribe though their precise location is a matter of dispute. Kirgin (2006) located Atintania on the area to the east of Apollonia and he mentioned the Atintanes as an Illyrian tribe. M. Dieterle (2007) considered that Atintania was part of Epirus, and together with Chaonia and Parauaea comprised the northern Epirote tribal region. Stocker (2009) notes that Pseudo-Scylax recorded the Atintanes as a tribe dwelling in the hinterland and to the south of Apollonia, inland from the coast, and that he mentioned no tribe in the immediate proximity of the apoikia. According to her there is no evidence about Cabanes' view that Atintanes controlled the Myzeqe plain and Apollonia. Stocker also questions the claim about their inclusion in a southern Illyrian koinon; commenting on the suggestion concerning a koinon that included three proposed Illyrian tribes (the Atintanes, the Bylliones and the Amantes), Stocker argues that the proposed Illyrian koinon was more likely limited in size to the southern, non-Greek speaking area of Illyria that did not include Epirus, since the latter was Greek speaking.

According to Burton (2011) the Atintani were located in the Illyrian interior. Heinz Warnecke (2014) considers the Atintanians as a tribe residing inland in northwestern Epirus. V. Parker (2014) considered Atintania as an inland region of Illyria. R. Waterfield (2014) considered Atintania as a district on the border between Illyria and Epirus, and he located the Atintani around Antigonea and Byllis. E. Shehi (2015) locates the Atintanes in southern Illyria, and he accepted the possibility of the inclusion of three main koina among the Atintanes: the Bylliones, the Amantes, and the Atintanes proper. Timothy Edward Schaefer (2015) considers Atinania as a part of Epirus.

Cartography by L. Martinez-Sève shows a large area between Illyria, Epirus and Macedonia, consisting of Atintania, Parauaea and Tymphaea, which according to M. P. Dausse (2015) can be considered a border or "intermediate area", as also stated by P. Cabanes. Dausse argued that the border between Illyrians and Epirotes depends on the location of the Atintanes, however it seems very difficult to set clear limits in those regions, especially because little is known about some peoples to precisely locate them. L. Martinez-Sève (2017) depicted Atintania on the lower valley of the Aoos, between Apollonia and Orikos. C. J. King (2017) considered the Atintani as an Illyrian tribe, and located Atintania alternatively in Illyria, Epirus or in Upper Macedonia (Macedon's westernmost meris around Lake Lycnhidos). P. Filos (2017) listed the Atintanes among the Greek-speaking minor tribes of Epirus. A. V. Vasilyev (2018) locates Atintania in Illyria. Jaupaj (2019) lists the Atintanes among the southern Illyrian tribes that inhabited a large territory reached as far as the area of Dodona at some point. According to him the Atintanes probably formed a larger koinon which may have included both Illyrian and Epirotic tribes and was reduced in territory over time as its communities formed their own polities. Hatzopoulos (2020) described the location proposed by M. Holleaux and P. Lévêque as "obvious and after all roughly correct solution", however he stated that in his proposal "Lévêque added the valley of the Drynos for no good reason".

Winnifrith (2021) concludes that the location of the Atintanes or Atintani is not clear and states that it is odd to locate the Illyrian Atintanes too far south in Epirote territory, as their presumed domicile in southern Albania or the Pindus range would give a quite weird shape to the Roman protectorate that included them. Also the Atintanian particular form of treachery, being unreliable components of the Roman protectorate, is not suitable for a southern location, since the Atintanes were detached from the Roman protectorate both by the Illyrian kingdom of the Ardiaei and by the kingdom of Macedon.

=== Possible existence of two tribes: Atintanes and Atintani ===
Due to controversial and contradicting information provided by ancient authors N. G. L. Hammond proposed two distinct homonymous tribes: the Epirote "Atintanes", located by him somewhere around the upper valley of the Drino; and the Illyrian "Atintani", located by him in the Çermenikë area in Central Albania. According to Hammond, the Epirote "Atintanes" are the tribe who appears in the accounts of western Greek campaigns of the Spartan admiral Knemos in 429, as reported by Thycydides, and who are also named by Pseudo-Scylax, Lycophron and Strabo, while the Illyrian "Atintani" are the tribe who appears in the accounts of Cassander's operations against Epidamnus in 314 BC, as reported by Polyaenus, and of the later Roman-Illyrian and Roman-Macedonian wars, as reported by Polybius, Appian and Livy. Hammond placed the boundary between the Epirote Atintanes and the Molossians at the upper Kalamas river as far as Kalpaki.

According to Dause Hammond's view about the existence of two different Atintanes/Atintani tribes and their location seems to be abandoned. Hatzopoulos states that although the specific view is "understandable" it is "unacceptable and unnecessary". S. Kos considered Cabanes' proposal seemingly more likely than Hammond's one. M.B. Hatzopoulos (1993) did not accept Hammond's proposal of two distinct tribes, and he located the Atintanes on the upper and middle valley of the Aoos, stretching up to the confluence of this river with the Drino. George Mallios (2011) agrees with Hammond that the Atintanians were Epirotes and not connected to the Illyrians. P. J. Burton (2011) considered the Atintani as an Illyrian people, specifying that for the identification of the tribe involved with Rome as the Illyrian Atintani, as opposed to the Epirote Atintanes, he referred the reader to Hammond (1989).

== History ==
In the context of post-Myceanaean era migration N.G.L. Hammond stated that the Atintanes were among those Doric tribes that did not follow the Dorian invaders in southern Greece but stayed in Epirus. A. J. Toynbee suggested the possibility that the Atintanes were connected with the Paeonian Tyntenoi that were pushed from the region of northern Macedonia towards the coastline.

At the beginning of the Peloponnesian War (429 B.C.), Atintanes and Molossians appear under the leadership of Sabylinthus, regent of king Tharrhypas, as allies of Sparta against Acarnania. At that time they were subordinate to the Molossians, while they were more loosely connected with the Parauoi and the Orestai. They were among the Epirote tribes that had kings. At 344 B.C. during the reign of Philip II of Macedon their region passed from Epirote to Macedonian control. In 330 B.C. the Atintanes formed the core of the Epirote state, together with the Molossians, Thesprotians, and the Cassopaeans. In epigraphy, Kleomachos the Atintanian was given ateleia in Epirus by the symmachoi (allies) of Epirotes, when king was Neoptolemus son of Alexander and Derkas, prostatas (archon) of the Molossians (c. 300 BC) indicating that by the end of the 4th century the Atintanes were not part of the Epirote confederacy. At 295 B.C. Pyrrhus of Epirus detached Atintanis and made it a part of the Epirote Kingdom again.

In 231 B.C. the Chaonian capital of Phoenice was raided by the Illyrians of Teuta. Those inhabitants of the city who survived the attack and slavery managed to flee to the territory of the Atintanes to seek for available reinforcements. Atintania was possibly ceded to Teuta by the League of the Epirotes at 230 B.C. probably as part of an agreement with her. When in 229 BC the First Illyrian War broke out between Rome and Illyrian queen Teuta, as well as Parthinians, the Atintanians took advantage of this situation and put themselves under Roman protection. After this conflict, in 229-228 BC Rome set a protectorate on the conquered Illyrian lands, the Greek cities of Apollonia and Epidamnus, Corfu, as well as Atintanis. The following years they supported the campaign of Demetrius of Pharos but after his defeat Atintania returned to Roman control. The region became a disputed zone between Romans and Macedon. In the Treaty of Phoenice, 205 BC, Atintania was assigned to the Macedonian Kingdom. As such it appears that it remained part of the 4th Macedonian meris the following years. The Atintanes received sacred Greek envoys as part of the Epirote League in c. 220-189 B.C.

In 167 B.C. after the Romans defeated the Macedonians at Pydna, they captured a total of seventy settlements of the Molossians and the Atintanians and sold 150,000 men into slavery. As part of the invasion of Epirus by the Romans the later continued with the destruction of Atintania, Molossis as well as east Chaonia even after 157 B.C.

== Bibliography ==
- Bici, Anxhelo (2025). "Organisation spatiale et évolution du cadre politique dans le territoire de l'Atintanie, VIe–IIe siècles av. J.-C". HAL Open Science (in French). Aix-Marseille Université.
- Burton, Paul J. (2011). Friendship and Empire: Roman Diplomacy and Imperialism in the Middle Republic (353–146 BC). Cambridge University Press. ISBN 9781139501866.
- Cabanes, Pierre (1976). L'Épire: De la mort de Pyrrhos à la conquête romaine, 272-167 av. J.-C (in French). Paris: Annales Littéraires de l'Université de Besancon.
- Cabanes, Pierre (1988). Les illyriens de Bardulis à Genthios (IVe–IIe siècles avant J.-C.) [The Illyrians from Bardylis to Gentius (4th – 2nd century BC)] (in French). Paris: SEDES. ISBN 2718138416.
- Castiglioni, Maria Paola (2003). "Il monumento degli Apolloniati a Olimpia". Mélanges de l'École française de Rome: Antiquité. 115 (2): 867–880. doi:10.3406/mefr.2003.9796.
- Hatzopoulos, M. B. (1997). "The Borders of Hellenism in Epirus during Antiquity". In M. V. Sakellariou (ed.). Ηπειρος: 4000 χρόνια ελληνικής ιστορίας και πολιτισμού. Ekdotike Athenon. ISBN 9789602133712.
- Hatzopoulos, M. B. (2020). Ancient Macedonia. Walter de Gruyter GmbH & Co KG. ISBN 978-3-11-071868-3.
- Ceka, Olgita (2012). "Il koinon e la città. L'esempio di Byllis". In G. de Marinis; G.M. FabriniG. Paci; R. Perna; M. Silvestrini (eds.). I processi formativi ed evolutividella città in area adriatica. BAR International Series. Vol. 2419. Archaeopress. pp. 59–64. ISBN 978-1-4073-1018-3.
- Dausse, Marie-Pierre (2015). Souchon, Cécile (ed.). "La Grèce du Nord aux IVe et IIIe siècles avant J.-C. : des États puissants aux frontières floues?". Actes des congrès nationaux des sociétés historiques et scientifiques: 24–31. doi:10.4000/books.cths.2013. ISBN 9782735508679.
- Filos, Panagiotis (2017). "The Dialectal Variety of Epirus". In Giannakis, Georgios; Crespo, Emilio; Filos, Panagiotis (eds.). Studies in Ancient Greek Dialects: From Central Greece to the Black Sea. Walter de Gruyter GmbH & Co KG. pp. 215–248. ISBN 9783110532135.
- Habicht, Christian (1997) [1995]. Athens from Alexander to Antony. Translated by Deborah Lucas Schneider. Harvard University Press. ISBN 0674051114.
- Hammond, Nicholas Geoffrey Lemprière (1966). "The Kingdoms in Illyria circa 400-167 B.C.". The Annual of the British School at Athens. 61. British School at Athens: 239–253. doi:10.1017/S0068245400019043. JSTOR 30103175. S2CID 164155370.
- Hammond, Nicholas Geoffrey Lemprière (1967). Epirus: the Geography, the Ancient Remains, the History and Topography of Epirus and Adjacent Areas. Clarendon P.
- Hammond, N. G. L. (1989). "The Illyrian Atintani, the Epirotic Atintanes and the Roman Protectorate". The Journal of Roman Studies. 79: 11–25. doi:10.2307/301177. JSTOR 301177. S2CID 162831458.
- Hammond, N. G. L. (1994a). "Illyrians and North-west Greeks". In Lewis, D. M.; Boardman, John; Hornblower, Simon; Ostwald, M. (eds.). The Cambridge Ancient History: The Fourth Century B.C. Cambridge University Press. pp. 422–443. ISBN 978-0-521-23348-4.
- Hammond, N. G. L. (1994). Collected studies. Hakkert.
- Jaupaj, Lavdosh (2019). Etudes des interactions culturelles en aire Illyro-épirote du VII au III siècle av. J.-C (Thesis). Université de Lyon; Instituti i Arkeologjisë (Albanie).

Katsikoudis, Nikos (2000). "Το θέατρο στην αρχαία Ήπειρο" (PDF). Dodona (18).

- King, Carol J. (2017). Ancient Macedonia. Routledge. ISBN 9780415827287.
- Kinzl, Konrad H. (2010). A Companion to the Classical Greek World. John Wiley & Sons. ISBN 9781444334128.
- Kirigin, Branko (2006). Pharos the Parian Settlement in Dalmatia: A Study of a Greek Colony in the Adriatic. Archeopress. ISBN 1841719919.
- Lasagni, Chiara (2019). Cresci Marrone, Giovannella; Culasso Gastaldi, Enrica (eds.). Le realtà locali nel mondo greco: Ricerche su poleis ed ethne della Grecia occidentale. Studi e testi di epigrafia. Edizioni dell'Orso. ISBN 978-88-6274-962-6.
- Leveque, P. (1997). "The Koinon of the Epirotes". In M. V. Sakellariou (ed.). Epirus, 4000 years of Greek history and civilization. Ekdotikē Athēnōn. ISBN 9789602133712.
- Hall, Jonathan M. (2001). "Contested Ethnicities: Perceptions of Macedonia within Evolving Definitions of Greek Identity". In Malkin, Irad (ed.). Ancient Perceptions of Greek Ethnicity. Center for Hellenic Studies colloquia. Vol. 5. Center for Hellenic Studies, Trustees for Harvard University. pp. 187–212. ISBN 978-0-674-00662-1.
- Mallios, Georgios (2011). Μύθος και ιστορία: η περίπτωση της Αρχαίας Μακεδονίας (in Greek).
- Martinez-Sève, Laurianne (2017). Atlas du monde hellénistique. Pouvoir et territoires après Alexandre le Grand. Autrement. ISBN 978-2746746411.
- Mesihović, Salmedin; Šačić, Amra (2015). Historija Ilira [History of Illyrians] (in Bosnian). Sarajevo: Univerzitet u Sarajevu [University of Sarajevo]. ISBN 978-9958-600-65-4.
- Parker, Victor (2014). A History of Greece, 1300 to 30 BC. John Wiley & Sons. ISBN 978-1405190336.
- Pliakou, Georgia (2007). Το λεκανοπέδιο των Ιωαννίνων και η ευρύτερη περιοχή της Μολοσσίας στην Κεντρική Ηπειρο: αρχαιολογικά κατάλοιπα, οικιστική οργάνωση και οικονομία [The basin of Ioannina and the wider area of Molossia in Central Epirus: archaeological remains sattlement [sic] patterns and economy] (PhD) (in Greek). University of Thessaloniki.
- Šašel Kos, Marjeta (2005). Appian and Illyricum. Narodni muzej Slovenije. ISBN 961616936X.
- Šašel Kos, Marjeta (2002). "Pyrrhus and Illyrian Kingdom(s?)". Greek Influence Along the East Adriatic Coast. Knjiga Mediterana. 26: 101–119. ISBN 9531631549.
- Shehi, Eduard (2015). Terra sigillata en Illyrie méridionale et en Chaonie: importations et productions locales (IIe S. AV. J.-C. -IIe S. AP. J.-C.). Col·lecció Instrumenta (in French). Vol. 48. Barcelona: Universitat de Barcelona, Publicacions i Edicions. ISBN 978-84-475-4238-3.
- Shpuza, Saimir (2009). "L'Illyrie méridionale à l'époque romaine". Mélanges de l'École française de Rome: Antiquité. 121 (2): 481–502. doi:10.3406/mefr.2009.10907.
- Stocker, Sharon R. (2009). Illyrian Apollonia: Toward a New Ktisis and Developmental History of the Colony.
- Thiry, Sébastien (2001). Les îles ioniennes de 480 à 167 avant J.-C.: étude de géopolitique (in French). Presses universitaires du Septentrion. ISBN 978-2-284-02181-0.
- Thompson, F. H. (2003). The Archaeology of Greek and Roman Slavery. Bloomsbury Academic. ISBN 978-0-7156-3195-9.
- Toynbee, Arnold Joseph (1969). Some problems of Greek history. Oxford University Press. ISBN 9780192152497.
- Vasilyev, Andrey V. (2018). "First steps of the Roman diplomacy in the Eastern Mediterranean: development of the common political strategy". Studia Antiqua et Archaeologica. 24 (2). ISSN 1224-2284.
- Waterfield, Robin (2014). Taken at the Flood: The Roman Conquest of Greece. Oxford: Oxford University Press. ISBN 9780199916894.
- Wilkes, John (1992). The Illyrians. Wiley-Blackwell. ISBN 0-631-19807-5.
- Wilkes, John (1995). Pierre Cabanes (ed.). "L'Illyrie méridionale et l'Epire dans l'antiquité. II". Journal of Hellenic Studies. ISBN 9780691033105.
- Winnifrith, Tom J. (2002). Badlands-borderlands: a history of Northern Epirus/Southern Albania. London: Duckworth. ISBN 0-7156-3201-9.
- Winnifrith, Tom (2021). Nobody's Kingdom: A History of Northern Albania. Andrews UK Limited. ISBN 9781909930957.
