= Molossians =

Αncient Greek tribe

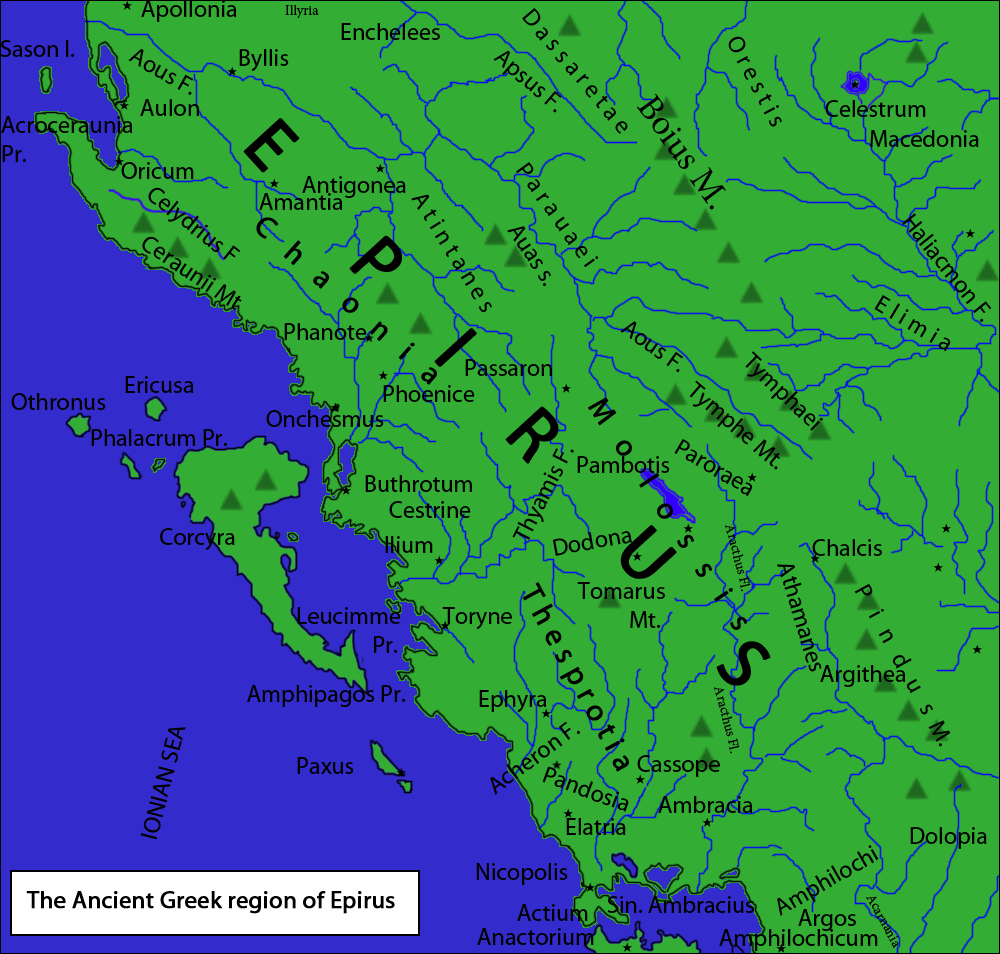
Map of Ancient Greek region of Epirus

Molossia in antiquity

The Molossians (Greek: Μολοσσοί or Μολοττοί, romanized: Molossoi or Molottoi) were a group of ancient Greek tribes which inhabited the region of Epirus in classical antiquity. Together with the Chaonians and the Thesprotians, they formed the main tribal groupings of the northwestern Greek group. On their northern frontier, they neighbored the Chaonians and on their southern frontier neighbored the kingdom of the Thesprotians. They formed their own state around 370 BC and were part of the League of Epirus. The most famous Molossian ruler was Pyrrhus of Epirus, considered one of the greatest generals of antiquity. The Molossians sided with the Macedonians against Rome in the Third Macedonian War (171–168 BC) and were defeated. Following the war, the region witnessed devastation while a considerable number of Molossians and other Epirotes were enslaved and transported to the Roman Republic, in the Italian Peninsula.

== Ancient sources ==
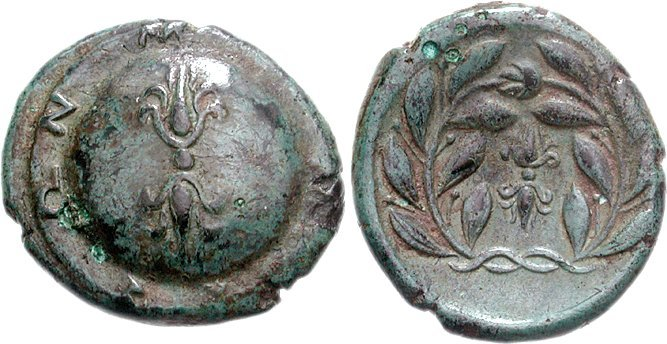
Coin of Molossi, 360–330/25 BC. Obverse: Vertical thunderbolt on shield, ΜΟΛΟΣΣΩΝ (of Molossians) around shield. Reverse: Thunderbolt within wreath.

According to Strabo, the Molossians, along with the Chaonians and Thesprotians, were the most famous among the fourteen tribes of Epirus, who once ruled over the whole region. The Chaonians ruled Epirus at an earlier time, and afterwards the Thesprotians and Molossians controlled the region. The Thesprotians, the Chaonians, and the Molossians were the three principal clusters of Greek tribes that had emerged from Epirus and were the most powerful among all other tribes.

The Molossians were also renowned for their vicious hounds, which were used by shepherds to guard their flocks. This is where the canine breed Molossoid, native to Greece, received its name. Virgil states that in ancient Greece the heavier Molossian dogs were often used by the Greeks and Romans for hunting (canis venaticus) and to watch over the house and livestock (canis pastoralis). "Never, with them on guard," says Virgil, "need you fear for your stalls a midnight thief, or onslaught of wolves, or Iberian brigands at your back."

Strabo records that the Thesprotians, Molossians and Macedonians referred to old men as pelioi (πελιοί) and old women as peliai (πελιαί) (<PIE *pel-, "grey"). Cf. Ancient Greek πέλεια peleia, "pigeon", so-called because of its dusky grey color. Ancient Greek πελός pelos meant "grey". Their senators were called Peligones (Πελιγόνες), similar to Macedonian Peliganes (Πελιγᾶνες).

== Molossian royalty ==
The Molossian ruling dynasty claimed to be descended from mythological Molossus, one of the three sons of Neoptolemus, son of Achilles and Deidamia, and Andromache. Following the sack of Troy, Neoptolemus and his armies settled in the land of the Molossians where they conquered the local population. Molossus inherited the kingdom of Epirus after the death of Helenus, son of Priam and Hecuba of Troy, who had been given the land and his erstwhile sister-in-law Andromache after Neoptolemus' death. According to some historians, their first king was Phaethon, one of those who came into Epirus with Pelasgus. According to Plutarch, Deucalion and Pyrrha, having set up the worship of Zeus at Dodona, settled there among the Molossians. At the time, among writers of the classical era these stories were not doubted. According to Johannes Engels (2010) in the Oxford Companion to Macedonia, genealogical links through the Trojan cycle and other myths strongly connected Epirus with the rest of Greece, precluding serious debate about the Greekness of the Epirotes, including the Molossians.

The most famed member of the Molossian dynasty was Pyrrhus, who became famous for his several Pyrrhic victories in battle over the Romans. According to Plutarch, Pyrrhus was the son of Aeacides of Epirus and a Greek woman from Thessaly named Phthia, the daughter of a war hero in the Lamian War. Pyrrhus was a second cousin of Alexander the Great. Moreover, Olympias, the mother of Alexander the Great, was a member of this celebrated sovereign house.

== History ==
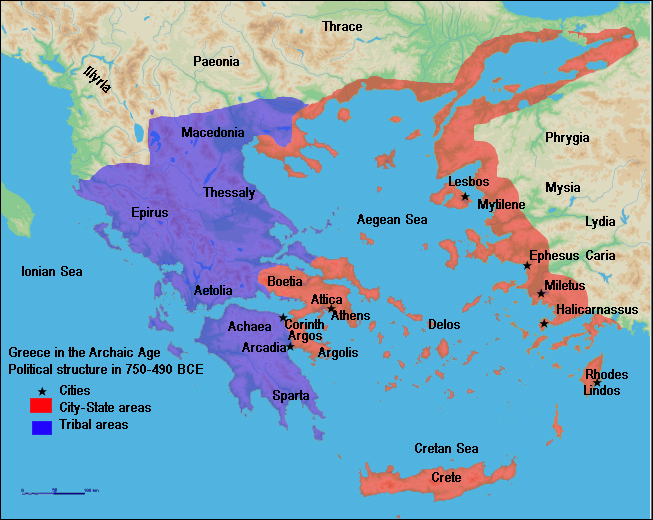
Political structure of the ancient Greek world (8th–5th centuries BC), with tribal social structures in purple

=== Molossian core ===
During the Late Bronze Age the Molossians were probably located over much of the central and western ranges of the Pindos. They were among the known Greek tribes of the Mycenaean period (1600–1100 BC) after the Proto-Greek split. The area of Pogoni has been regarded as the heartland of the Molossian tribes due to the large number of tumuli burials found in this region dating from that time. They initially lived in small unwalled settlements, kata komas, mainly scattered in the river valleys and lakeside areas of central Epirus. Among those settlements the most excavated were located in Liatovouni at the confluence of the Aoös and Voidomatis rivers at the valley of Konitsa established in the 13th–12th century B.C and Vitsa (from 9th century B.C). At the earliest burial at Liatovouni Mycenaean weapons were unearthed. This Molossian cemetery consist of a total of 103 burials and was in use until late 5th to early 4th century B.C. A large Molossian cemetery, was also found at Koutsokrano, Pogoni.

=== Molossian expansion ===
Molossians were also among the Greek colonists that reached the Ionian shore of Asia Minor during the period of its colonization (1020–900 BC). The Molossian expansion in Epirus possibly began in the early 6th century BC. As such they became a leading power in the region already from the time of historian Hecataeus (c. 550–476 BC). Their expansion was primarily directed towards the Thesprotians. However, the nearby Chaonians also lost some pastures but they kept control of an area stretching from Grammos (ancient Boion) to the southwest of Ohrid-Prespa.

The Epirotes were traditionally on friendly terms with the Corinthians, however in 5th century BC during the last decades of the reign of Tharyps, the Molossians adopted a pro-Athenian policy. This change had also its effects in trade.

In 385 BC, Alcetas, the deposed Molossian king who was exiled to the court of Dionysius of Syracuse with aid by the Illyrians, attacked the faction of Molossian dynasty who had overthrown him and attempted to take power. Dionysius planned to control all the Ionian Sea. Sparta intervened and expelled the Illyrians who were led by Bardyllis. Even with the aid of 2,000 Greek hoplites and 500 suits of Greek armour, the Illyrians were defeated by the Spartans (led by Agesilaus) but not before ravaging the region and killing 15,000 Molossians. Alcetas eventually managed to restore his power and brought the Molossian state closer to Athens (the traditional enemy of Sparta).

=== Unified Epirus ===
The ruling Molossian Aeacidae dynasty managed to create the first centralized state in Epirus c. 370 BC, expanding their power at the expense of rival tribes. The Aeacids allied themselves with the increasingly powerful kingdom of Macedon, in part against the common threat of Illyrian raids, and in 359 BC the Molossian princess Olympias, niece of Arybbas of Epirus, married King Philip II of Macedon (r. 359–336 BC). She was to become the mother of Alexander the Great. On the death of Arybbas, Alexander the Molossian, uncle of Alexander the Great of Macedon, succeeded to the throne with the title King of Epirus.

In 334 BC, the time Alexander the Great crossed into Asia, Alexander I the Molossian led an expedition in southern Italy in support of the Greek cities of Magna Graecia (Taras) against the nearby Italic tribes. After some successes on the battlefield, he was defeated by a coalition of Italic tribes at the Battle of Pandosia in 331 BC.

In another Illyrian attack in 360 BC, the Molossian king Arymbas (or Arybbas) evacuated his non-combatant population to Aetolia and let the Illyrians loot freely. The stratagem worked, and the Molossians fell upon the Illyrians, who were encumbered with booty, and defeated them.

In 330 BC, upon Alexander the Molossian's death, the term "Epirus" appears as a single political unit in the ancient Greek records for the first time, under the leadership of the Molossian dynasty. Subsequently, the coinages of the three major Epirote tribal groups came to an end, and a new coinage was issued with the legend Epirotes.

After Alexander's I death, Aeacides of Epirus, who succeeded him, espoused the cause of Olympias against Cassander, but was dethroned in 313 BC.

=== Reign of Pyrrhus ===
Aeacides's son Pyrrhus came to the throne in 295 BC. In 295 BC, Pyrrhus transferred the capital of his kingdom from Passaron to Ambracia. In c. 290 BC, Pyrrhus made Dodona the religious capital of his domain and adorned it by implementing a series of construction projects. Pyrrhus, being a skillful general, was encouraged to aid the Greeks of Tarentum and decided to initiate a major offensive in the Italian Peninsula and Sicily. Due to its superior martial abilities, the Epirote army defeated the Romans in the Battle of Heraclea (280 BC). Subsequently, Pyrrhus's forces nearly reached the outskirts of Rome, but had to retreat to avoid an unequal conflict with a more numerous Roman army. The following year, Pyrrhus invaded Apulia (279 BC) and the two armies met in the Battle of Asculum where the Epirotes won the eponymous Pyrrhic victory, at a high cost.

In 277 BC, Pyrrhus captured the Carthaginian fortress in Eryx, Sicily. This prompted the rest of the Carthaginian-controlled cities to defect to Pyrrhus. His Italian campaign came to an end following the inconclusive Battle of Beneventum (275 BC). Having lost the vast majority of his army, he decided to return to Epirus, which finally resulted in the loss of all his Italian holdings. Because of his costly victories, the term "Pyrrhic victory" is often used for a victory with devastating cost to the victor.

=== Koinon of the Epirotes ===
In 233 BC, the last surviving member of the Aeacid royal house, Deidamia, was murdered. Her death brought the Epirote royal family to an abrupt extinction and a federal republic was set up. The reasons for the swift fall of the Aeacid dynasty were probably complex. Aetolian pressure must have played a part, and the alliance with Macedonia may have been unpopular; in addition, there were perhaps social tensions. However, Epirus remained a substantial power, unified under the auspices of the Epirote League as a federal state with its own parliament (or synedrion).

==== Conquest and enslavement by Rome ====
In the following years, Epirus faced the growing threat of the expansionist Roman Republic, which fought a series of wars with Macedonia. The League remained neutral in the first two Macedonian Wars. However, they sided with the anti-Roman Macedonian-Illyrian pact in the Third Macedonian War (171–168 BC). After the Roman victory, a total of 150,000 Epirotes, mostly Molossians, were enslaved and sent to Italy, by decision of the Roman Senate. This decision is the only such act of the Roman senate and the largest, single, slave-hunting operation in Roman history. In the following years, Epirote slaves in Italy outnumbered slaves of other origins and the majority of slave marriages were between Epirotes. In historiography, the decision of the senate has been the subject of much debate, as the two main anti-Roman powers of the time in that region, the Macedonians and the Illyrians, suffered few consequences in contrast to the Molossians in terms of punishment. In past scholarship, the theory of Howard Hayes Scullard was the most recognized theory. He connected the measures taken by the Romans to Charops of Epirus, member of a rival tribe the Chaonians – a Roman ally – who in order to gain command of the region, pushed for the extermination of the Molossians. This interpretation is based on the negative assessment of Charops, already in ancient sources, as Polybius calls him "the most savage and degenerate of all men". The modern interpretation of the events, focuses more on the structural reasons which led to this decision by the Romans rather than the personal politics of regional actors. The plague of 174 BC caused a great reduction of available labor in Italy, which was supplied almost exclusively by slave labor. In the following years, slave-hunting became a central feature of Roman campaigns. The Roman senate, which represented the landowning elite, specifically targeted the Molossians because of the proximity of their territory to Brundisium and Taranto would require a much lower cost of transportation. In comparison, at least 65,000 Sardinians and many other tribes were enslaved in the same year. However, recent research and new interpretations on the scale of the devastation has challenged those traditional views by some contemporary authors, as such those claims about 70 razed settlements and 150,000 captured slaves were not exact, but symbolic figures. Though the region witnessed widescale destruction the Greek language in Epirus showed remarkable vitality in the following centuries both in the cities as well as outside them.

== Culture ==
=== Language ===
Map of Ancient Greek dialects

There is today an overall consensus that the Molossians were among the Greek-speaking population of Epirus, which spoke the Northwest Doric dialect of Ancient Greek, akin to that of Aetolia, Phocis, and certain other regions, this is also attested by the available epigraphic evidence in Epirus. Eugene Borza argues that the Molossians originated from those Proto-Greek tribes that inhabited northwestern Greece in c. 2600 BC. Linguist Vladimir Georgiev argues that northwestern Greece, including Molossia, was part of the Proto-Greek region, before the Late Bronze Age migrations. After the split of Proto-Greek (c. 1700 BC) the northern Greek dialect was spoken in Epirus. As such the Molossians were among the 32 known Greek tribes of the Mycenaean Age. N. G. L. Hammond (1982) argues that the Molossians and other Epirote tribes spoke Greek at least from the Dark Ages (1100–800 BC). The language the Epirotes spoke was regarded as a primitive Northwestern Greek dialect, but there was no question that it was Greek.

Earlier historians (Nilsson (1909 and 1951), Meyer (1878)) argued for a possible partial Hellenization of pre-classical Epirus, with Greek elites ruling over a population of non-Greek origin. However, such views were based on subjective ancient testimonies and are not supported by the earliest epigraphic evidence.

==== Upper Macedonian tribes ====
In the region of Upper Macedonia, the tribes of Pelagones in the region of Prilep, Lyncestae in the region of Florina, Orestae in the region of Kastoria, and Elimiotae in the region of Kozani were all Epirotic Molossian tribes and they talked the Northwest Greek dialect. Available inscriptional and ancient literature points that the local population spoke a Northwest Greek dialect in contrast to those of Lower Macedonia whose dialect may have been related more to Aeolic Greek.

=== Society and views among Greeks ===
In modern research, the question of identity has arisen about what constituted the ancient Greek identity, with mode of life as the main criterion of ethnicity construction, regardless of what language they spoke. In each given historical era, the Molossians were regarded as "barbarians" by many contemporary Greeks, not on the basis of language, but because of their tribal way of life, their organization, and their pastoral economy. In this context, the Epirotes were more similar to the Macedonians and the non-Greek Illyrians than to those ancient Greeks who were organized in city-states. A larger hellenization process among Molossians and other Epirotes continued after the Roman conquest, nevertheless most scholars don't object the fact that they were Greek in terms of language. In the view of Irad Malkin, following Hammond, Greek was spoken at least since the 5th century BC, and notes that it may have been the prestige language without the Molossians themselves necessarily being regarded as Greeks. Moreover, Malkin specifies that they were Greek-speakers, though not universally regarded as "Greek" by other Greeks. According to Johannes Engels, however, the way of life in Epirus was more archaic than that in the Corinthian and Corcyrean colonies on the coast, but there was never a discussion about their Greekness.

The ancient historians and geographers did not follow the scientific methods of modern linguists, who record in detail the speech of the groups they study; their information was based, more rarely on personal experiences, and mostly on the impressions of each of their informants, who as a rule, had neither philological training nor particularly linguistic interests. A far more reliable source about the actual views of the Greeks regarding Epirus is the list of theorodokoi (Ancient Greek: θεωρόδοκοι or θεαροδόκοι; sacred envoy-receivers whose duty was to host and assist the theoroi (θεωροί 'viewers') before the Panhellenic games and festivals), listing Greek cities and tribes, to which the major Panhellenic sanctuaries sent theoroi in Epidaurus, which includes all of the Epirotic tribes. The weight of this evidence is decisive because only Greeks were allowed to participate in the Panhellenic games and festivals. The list, which was compiled in 360 BC, includes the sacred envoys (members of the ruling family of each tribe or subtribe) of the Molossians, Kassopeans, Chaonians and Thesprotians.

The oracle of Dodona was located in the center of the homeland of the Molossians, the Molossis, which has always been regarded as a Greek oracle, the latter being a well-established religious sanctuary of Zeus since at least the Geometric Age (c. 1100–800 BC). Aristotle stated that "Hellas" was located around Dodona and Achelous. Moreover, according to Malkin, two of the three comprehensive names used for the Greeks still in use to this day (Graikoi, Hellenes and Ionians) are associated with Dodona and Epirus. Aristotle also considered the region around Dodona the region where the Hellenes originated.

=== Local Greek script ===
The first inscriptions come from Corinthian colonies or dedications to Dodona and are not representative of sites in Epirus, although some of the early Dodona tablets may be related to Epirus. The first epigraphic evidence in Epirus outside of Dodona and the nearby colonies dates from the beginning of 4th century BC. The Molossian decrees issued during the reign of king Neoptolemos I (370–368 BC) display considerable experience in the use of Greek language. They used a Greek dialect which was not borrowed by nearby Corinthian colonies, but a distinct northwestern Greek dialect similar to Akarnanian, Aetolian and Lokrian, which also exhibited several unique features. Thus, the possibility of being borrowed is rejected. Most inscriptions comes from the late Classical or the Hellenistic era, in which they were under influence from a northwestern Doric dialect also used by the adjacent populations. The epigraphic corpus unearthed during the recent decades also yielded a great number of onomastics which is of Greek origin akin to the onomastic areas of Thessaly and Macedon. Based on these points the possibility of Greek being not the ancestral language among Epirotes can be easily rejected.

Historian Elizabeth Meyer, in 2013 suggested a new chronology for some inscriptions in Dodona (from early 4th century to one century later), if accurate this would have larger implications about local history, but not all historians will be convinced by the interpretations suggested in this account and further investigation is needed.

=== Religion ===
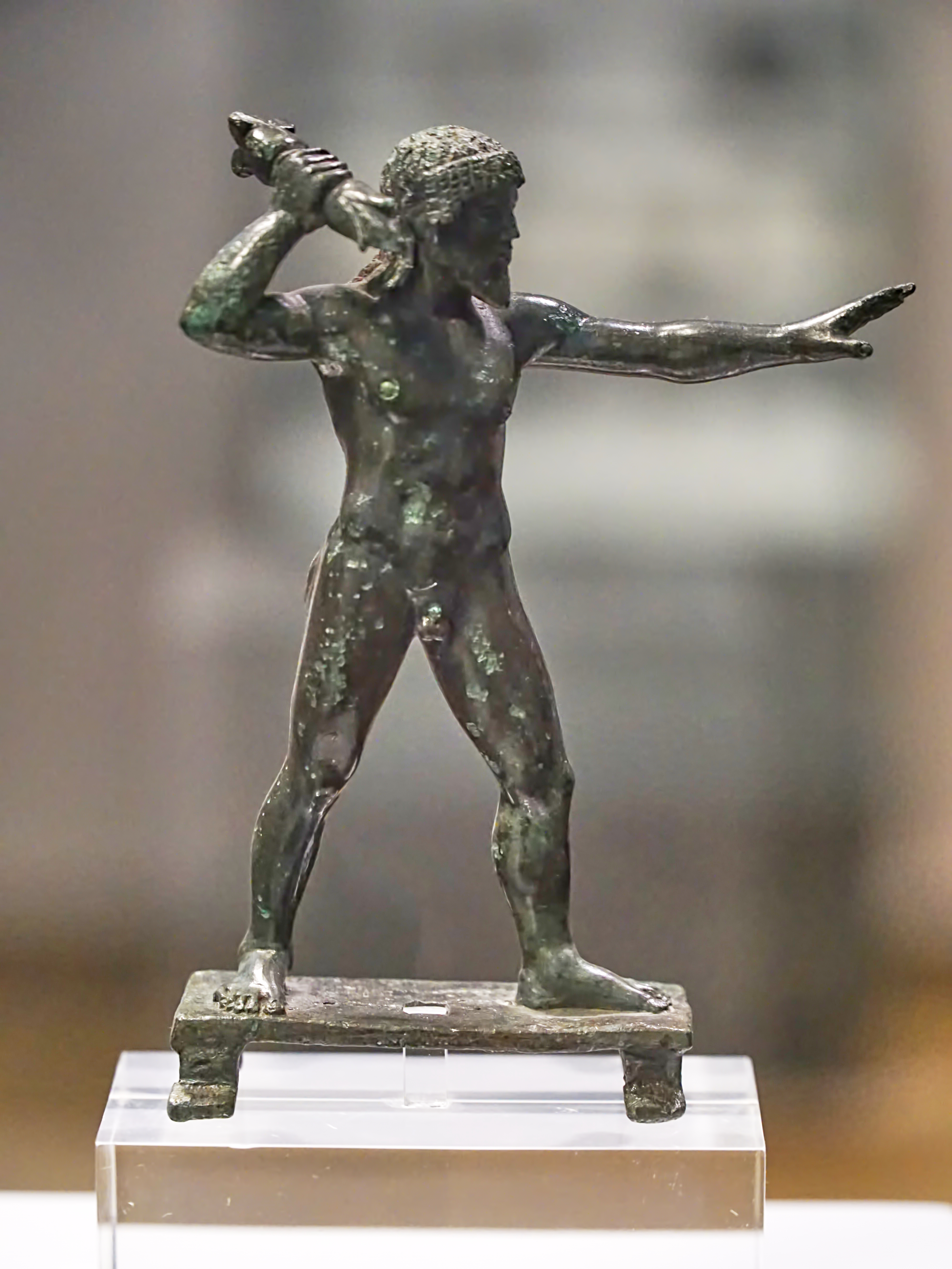
Bronze figurine of Zeus Keraunios bearing a thunderbolt, from the oracle of Dodona; preserved in the National Archaeological Museum of Athens

In terms of religion they worshipped the same gods like the rest of the Greeks. No traces of non-Greek deities were found until the Hellenistic age (with the introduction of oriental deities in the Greek world). Their supreme deity was Zeus and the Oracle of Dodona found in the land of the Molossians attracted pilgrims from all over the Greek world. As with the rest of the Epirotes they were included in the thearodokoi catalogues where only Greeks were allowed to participate in Panhellenic Games and festivals.

=== Mythological royal genealogy ===
In ancient Greece common descent was demonstrated thorough genealogies and foundation legends. As such the local royal household, the settlements and tribes traced their origin to Achaean mythical heroes of the Mycenaean era. Such genealogies were known and widely accepted in Ancient Greece at least from the end of the Archaic period, as demonstrated in the poems of Pindar (c. 518 – 438 BC) dedicated to the Achaean Neoptolemos. As such, in order to increase their prestige, the ruling dynasty of the Molossians in classical antiquity constructed a prestigious genealogy going back to the Trojan War and then these names from the Trojan cycle were used for contemporary rulers of the dynasty like Neoptolemos and Pyrrhus of Epirus.

In the case of the Molossian ruling class, the philosopher who has been credited with much of the mythological construction of their origins is Proxenus of Atarneus (early 4th century BC). This use of names from Iliad was contrary to ancient Greek name giving customs of classical antiquity in which names from the Iliad were not given to living people. When the ruling class of the Molossians began to construct such a genealogy is unclear. The various theories place it chronologically from a post-Odyssey framework to the 5th century BC. The initial reasons for doing so are also debated.

The conflict with the Thessalian tribes to the east (who claimed similar mythological ancestry as the later Molossians) and the beginning of the Hellenization of the Molossians in the 5th century BC have been argued as contributing factors for these constructions. An important point is that the function of this construction of a fictional genealogy by the ruling dynasty of the Molossians was not to Hellenize the ethnic origin of their people, but to heroize their house. In this context, the purpose of the constructed genealogy was to provide the Molossian dynasty with a "cultural passport as Greeks" in their relations with other ruling houses. These genealogical claims from the Molossian ruling dynasty were part of a planned effort by them in order to use elements of Greek culture for their own political ends in order to dominate in regional power struggles.

=== Politics and offices ===
Plutarch writes a story that was related to him, according to which, the Molossian king Tharrhypas was the first in his dynasty to become renowned, as he organized his cities on a system of Greek customs, rules and regulations. He was probably responsible for the earliest known decrees of the Molossian state in 370–368 BC, during the reign of his grandson Neoptolemus I; though, the institutions originated much earlier, and the dialect in which they are written is not, as was believed, the Doric of the Corinthian colonies, but a Northwest Greek dialect with several distinctive features, so as to rule out the case of it having been borrowed. In the early 4th century BC (c. 370–368 BC), the Molossian officials were the king, the prostatai (Greek: προστάται) literally meaning "protectors" like most Greek tribal states at the time, the grammateus (Greek: γραμματεύς) meaning "secretary", the hieromnemones (Greek: ἱερομνήμονες) literally meaning "of the sacred memory" and the ten damiourgoi (Greek: δημιουργοί) literally meaning "creators"; one each for the ten tribes which made up the Molossian group (Arctanes, Tripolies, Celaethoi, Genoaei, Ethnestes, Triphyles, Omphales, Onopernoi and Amymnoi. Once a year the king of the Molossians, having sacrificed to Zeus Areios as god of war, made a formal exchange of oaths with the Molossian tribes, swearing to rule in accordance to the laws. A later inscription, dating probably within the reign of Neoptolemus (shortly before c. 360 BC), named the Molossian state as "koinon of the Molossians" and mentioned not only the previous ten tribes but also additional five (among them the Orestae and the Paroroi)—from the region of north Pindus—a region which had evidently entered Molossian rule. The state officials now were: the king, the prostates, the secretary (grammateus) and a board of fifteen synarchontes (Greek: συνάρχοντες), literally meaning "co-rulers", instead of the earlier ten damiourgoi. The king also held the military command as an 'Aeacidae'; a descendant of Achilles.

An inscription from the 4th century stated (referring to Alexander I of Epirus):

When King was Alexandros when of Molossoi prostatas was Aristomachos Omphalas secretary was Menedamos Omphalas resolved by the assembly of the Molossoi; Kreston is benefactor hence to give citizenship to Kteson and descent line

The shrine of Dodona was used for the display of public decisions. Despite having a monarchy, the Molossians sent princes to Athens to learn of democracy, and they did not consider certain aspects of democracy incompatible with their form of government.

=== Symbols ===
The typical emblem inscribed on Molossian coins was the molossian dog on a shield with the legend Μολοσσοί.

== List of Molossians ==
- Pyrrhus of Epirus (318–272 BC), most prominent Epirote king
- Olympias, the mother of Alexander the Great
- Alexander the Great, through his mother Olympias
- Alexander I, brother of Olympias, Molossian king 342–330/329 BC
- Neoptolemus, son of Achilles and Deidamia (Aeacid dynasty till 231 BC)
- Molossus, son of Neoptolemus and Andromache
- Alcon (6th century BC), suitor of Agariste of Sicyon
- Admetus, who gave asylum to Themistocles
- Eidymmas prostates, secretary Amphikorios gave citizenship το Philista, wife of Antimachos from Arrhonos, under King Neoptolemos I 370–368 BC
- Tharyps, theorodokos in Epidauros 365 BC
- Arybbas, winner in Tethrippon Olympics 344 BC.
- Aristomachos prostates secretary Menedamos gave citizenship to Simias of Apollonia, resident at Theptinon, under King Alexander I 342–330/329 BC.
- Deidamia II of Epirus (died circa 233 BC), last surviving representative of the royal Aeacid dynasty
- Kephalos, Antinoos sided with Perseus against the Romans (Third Macedonian War) circa 170 BC

== Family tree of kings of Epirus ==
Family of Molossians

AEACIDAE
Tharrhypas king of Epirus; 430–392 BC
Alcetas I king of Epirus; 390–370 BC
Neoptolemus I king of Epirus; 370–357 BC	Arybbas king of Epirus; 370–343 BC
Philip II king of Macedon	Olympias	Alexander I king of Epirus; 343/2–331 BC	Troas	Alcetas II king of Epirus; 313–306 BC	Aeacides king of Epirus; 331–316, 313 BC	Phthia daughter of Menon IV of Pharsalus
Alexander the Great king of Macedon lord of Asia	Cleopatra	Neoptolemus II king of Epirus; 302–297 BC	Deidamia I	Demetrius I Poliorketes king of Macedon ∞ Phila	2.Lanassa daughter of Agathocles of Syracuse king of Sicily	Pyrrhus I king of Epirus 306–302 BC and 297–272 BC, of Macedon 274–272 BC, of Syracusse 278–276 BC ∞ 3.Bircenna	1.Antigone daughter of Philip and Berenice I
Antigonos II Gonatas king of Macedon	(1) Ptolemy military officer	(2) Alexander II king of Epirus; 272–242 BC	(1) Olympias II
Demetrius II king of Macedon	Phthia	Pyrrhus II king of Epirus; 242–238 BC	Ptolemy king of Epirus; 238–235 BC
Nereis ∞ Gelo king of Syracuse	Deidamia II queen of Epirus; 235 – c. 231 BC	Pyrrhus III king of Epirus; 235 BC

== See also ==
- Invasion of Molossia
- Chaonia
- Thesprotia
- Tymphaea
