= Alcetas (disambiguation) =

Alcetas (died 320 BC) was a Macedonian general.

Alcetas, Alcetes or Alketas may also refer to:

== Ancient period ==
- Alcetas I of Macedon (576–547 BC)
- Alcetas II of Macedon (454–448 BC)
- Alcetas I of Epirus (390/385–370 BC)
- Alcetas II of Epirus (313–306 ВС)

== Modern period ==
- Alketas Panagoulias (1934–2012), Greek footballer and coach
- Alketas of Alexandreia, Greek athletic team
