= Pyrrhus III of Epirus =

King of Epirus

Pyrrhus III, king of Epirus in 234 BC, was a son of Ptolemy and a grandson of Alexander II. He ascended to the throne in 234 BC. Pyrrhus III was assassinated, and he was then succeeded by his cousin Laodamia, or Deidamia (daughter of Pyrrhus II) who was the last of the Pyrrhus line. With his death, the male line of the royal family of Epirus became extinct.

== See also ==
- List of the kings of Ancient Epirus

== Sources ==
Humphreys, Henry. The Coin Collector's Manual Or Guide to the Numismatic Student in the Formation of a Cabinet of Coins: Volume 1.
