= Illyrian invasion of Epirus =

Illyrian invasion against the Molossians (385 BC)

Date	385 BC
Location	Epirus
Result	Alcetas I restored to the throne of Epirus; Spartan intervention and Illyrian withdrawal from Epirus after a short raid

Belligerents
Illyrians	Molossians
Supported by: Syracusans	Supported by: Thessalians; Macedonians; Spartans

Commanders and leaders
Illyrian king Bardylis; Dionysius I Alcetas I	Pro-Spartan Molossian dynast Agesilaus II

Strength
Unknown number of Illyrians; 2,000 Syracusan soldiers	Unknown

Casualties and losses
Unknown	15,000 Molossians killed

An Illyrian invasion against the Molossians in Epirus occurred in 385 BC. Illyrians, led by king Bardylis, were supported by Dionysius I of Syracuse who was aiming to expand his influence in the eastern Adriatic Sea and Ionian Sea, and by Alcetas I of Epirus who was expelled from his land by the Molossian pro-Spartan party and exiled in Syracuse.

== History ==
In 385 BC, Alcetas of Epirus was a refugee in Syracuse for unknown reasons. The tyrant of Syracuse, Dionysius, wanted a friendly monarch in Epirus, so he sent 2,000 Greek hoplites and 500 suits of Greek armour to help the Illyrians, who at that time were led by king Bardylis, for their battles with the Molossians in Epirus. Attackers killed about 15,000 Molossians. Alcetas was restored to the throne, but the Illyrians didn't stop there. They continued pillaging throughout Epirus and parts of Greece. Dionysius joined them in an attempt to plunder the temple of Delphi. Then, Sparta, supported by Thessaly and Macedonians, intervened under Agesilaus, and expelled the Illyrians and the Syracusan warriors.

== See also ==
- Illyrian warfare

== Bibliography ==
- Castiglioni, Maria Paola (2007). "Genealogical Myth and Political Propaganda in Antiquity: the Re-Use of Greek Myths from Dionysius to Augustus". In Carvalho, Joaquim (ed.). Religion and Power in Europe: Conflict and Convergence. Edizioni Plus. ISBN 978-88-8492-464-3.
- Howe, T. (2017). "Plain tales from the hills: Illyrian influences on Argead military development". In Müller, S.; Howe, Tim; Bowden, H.; Rollinger, R. (eds.). The History of the Argeads: New Perspectives. Wiesbaden. ISBN 978-3447108515.
- King, Carol J. (2017). Ancient Macedonia. Routledge. ISBN 9780415827287.
- Lane Fox, R. (2011). "399–369 BC". In Lane Fox, R. (ed.). Brill's Companion to Ancient Macedon: Studies in the Archaeology and History of Macedon, 650 BC – 300 AD. Leiden: Brill. pp. 209–234. ISBN 978-90-04-20650-2.
- Malkin, Irad (1998). The Returns of Odysseus: Colonization and Ethnicity. Berkeley: University of California Press. ISBN 9780520920262.
