= Ptolemy of Epirus =

Ptolemy
- King of Epirus
- Reign: 237 - 234 BC
- Predecessor: Pyrrhus II of Epirus
- Successor: Deidamia II or Pyrrhus III
- Issue: Pyrrhus III of Epirus
- House: Aeacidae
- Father: Alexander II of Epirus
- Mother: Olympias II of Epirus
- Religion: Ancient Greek religion

Ptolemy (Greek: Πτολεμαῖος), king of Epirus (237 BC – 234 ВС) was the second son of Alexander II, king of Epirus, and Olympias, grandson of the great Pyrrhus and brother of Phthia of Macedon. He was named in honour of his late uncle Ptolemy. He succeeded to the throne on the death of his elder brother, Pyrrhus II of Epirus, but reigned only a very short time, having set out on a military expedition, during the course of which he fell sick and died or, according to Polyaenus, he was treasonably assassinated. The date of his reign cannot be fixed with certainty, but as he was a contemporary of Demetrius II, king of Macedonia, it may be placed between 239 and 229 BC. He was succeeded by Deidamia II or Pyrrhus III.

== Notes ==
Preceded by Pyrrhus II	King of Epirus; 237–234 BC	Succeeded by Pyrrhus III
