= Pyrrhus II of Epirus =

Pyrrhus II
- King of Epirus
- Reign: 255–237 BC
- Predecessor: Alexander II of Epirus
- Successor: Ptolemy of Epirus
- Issue: Deidamia II of Epirus; Nereis of Epirus
- House: Aeacidae
- Father: Alexander II of Epirus
- Mother: Olympias II of Epirus
- Religion: Ancient Greek religion

Pyrrhus II (Greek: Πύρρος) was the son of Olympias II and Alexander II of Epirus. He was a brother of Ptolemy and Phthia of Macedon. He ruled as king of Epirus from 255 BC to 237 BC. He had two daughters: Deidamia II who was the last ruler of the Aeacid Dynasty and Nereis who married Gelon of Syracuse.

Tribes of Epirus in antiquity

Preceded by Alexander II	King of Epirus; 255–237 BC	Succeeded by Ptolemy
