= Omphales =

Ancient Greek tribe

The Omphales (Ancient Greek: Ομφάλες) were an ancient Greek tribe which inhabited the region of Epirus in antiquity. They were considered a subgroup of the Molossians or the Chaonians, while their precise location in Epirus is debated among scholars.

== History ==
The Omphales were counted among the eleven tribes that lived in classical Epirus as listed by Strabo. They belonged to the northwestern Greek group of tribes. It is not certain whether they were part of the larger Epirote groups of the Chaonians or the Molossians.

By 370 BC, they were part of the Molossian state during the reign of Neoptolemus I of Epirus. As part of the Molossian koinon they participated in the executive council of the Molossian League; the synarchontes (Greek: συνάργοντες) with one member. Participation in the council of the Molossian synarchontes is again recorded at an inscription of 344 BC.

== Location ==
The territory of the Omphales according to historians Nicholas G. L. Hammond and P. Cabanes was found between the Drino and Aoos rivers. Hammond states that they were a Molossian ethnos (tribe), while P. Cabanes suggests that they were a Chaonian one and were assosiacated with the unidentified Chaonian settlement of Ompalion. Both historians agree that they were located between the Chaonians and the Parauaei. Hammond additionally states that their area stretched from Old (Upper) Pogoni to Antigonia. Hatzopoulos disagrees on this and states that this area was inhabited by the Atintanes instead. Another view presented by Dakaris states that they were located at the region of Kestrine, at the north of the Thyamis river, in southern Chaonia.
