= Passaron =

Ancient city acropolis site in Epirus

Coordinates: 39°42′36″N 20°45′58″E

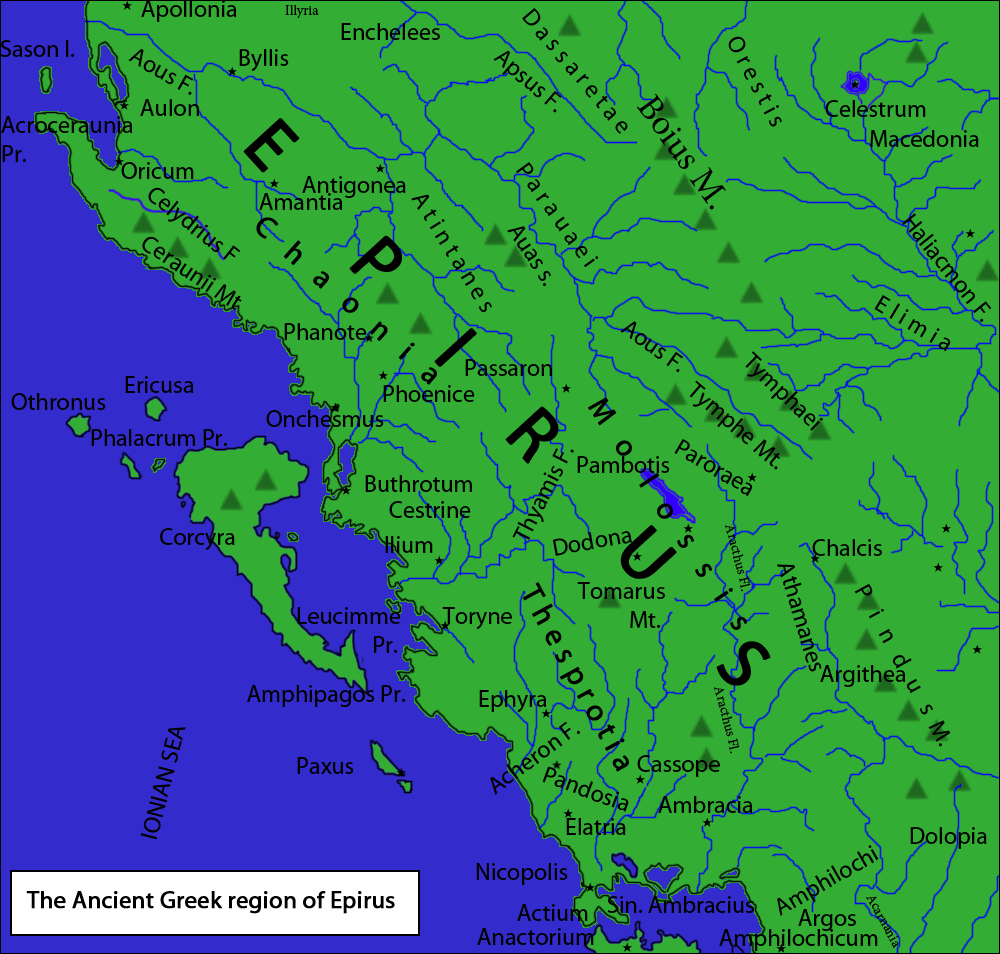
Map of Ancient Greek region of Epirus

Epirus in antiquity

Passaron (Greek: Πασσαρών) was an ancient Greek city of ancient Epirus. It was founded by the Molossian king Tharrhypas sometime between 420 and 400 BCE as the capital of the Molossian kingdom. As capital, the Molossian kings and the assembled people were accustomed to take mutual oaths, the one to govern according to the laws, the other to defend the kingdom. Later, in 330 BCE, it became the capital of the newfound united kingdom of Epirus until 295 BCE, when Pyrrhus of Epirus moved the capital to Amvrakia. The town was taken by the Roman praetor Lucius Anicius Gallus in 167 BCE.

Its site is located near the modern Rodotopi in the municipal unit of Pasaronas (Greek: Πασαρώνας) in the Ioannina regional unit, in Greece.

== See also ==
- List of cities in ancient Epirus
- Dodona
- Ambracia
- Chaonia
- Olympias
