= List of kings of Epirus =

Tribes of Epirus in antiquity

This list of kings of Epirus below includes all kings and queens, along with princes and princesses until the last representative of the royal Aeacid dynasty whereupon a democracy was established. In 168 BC, Epirus became the Roman province of Epirus Vetus.

King	Start date	End date	Reign length	Notes
Admetus	before 470 BC	430 BC	40 years	
Tharrhypas	430 BC	392 BC	38 years	
Alcetas I	390 BC	370 BC	20 years	
Neoptolemus I	370 BC	357 BC	13 years	Co-ruler with Arybbas
Arybbas	370 BC	343 BC	30 years	Co-ruler with Neoptolemus I until 357 BC
Alexander I	343 BC	331 BC	11 years	
Aeacides	331 BC	317 BC	14 years	
Neoptolemus II	317 BC	313 BC	4 years	
Aeacides	313 BC	313 BC	-	Second reign
Alcetas II	313 BC	306 BC	7 years	
Pyrrhus I	307 BC	302 BC	5 years	First reign
Neoptolemus II	302 BC	297 BC	5 years	Second reign
Pyrrhus I	297 BC	272 BC	25 years	Second reign
Alexander II	272 BC	255 BC	17 years	
Olympias	-	-	-	Regent after Alexander II died, until at least 239 BC
Pyrrhus II	255 BC	237 BC	18 years	
Ptolemy	237 BC	234 BC	3 years	
Pyrrhus III	234 BC	234 BC	-	
Deidamia	234 BC	233 BC	1 year	Queen regnant

Epirus regained its statehood in 1205 AD, ruled by the Despot of Epirus.

== See also ==
- List of ancient Epirotes
