= Nereis of Epirus =

Ancient Epirote princess

Nereis of Epirus was a daughter of Pyrrhus II. She was married, apparently after her father's death, to Gelo, son of Hiero II, king of Syracuse, Magna Graecia, by whom she became the mother of the king Hieronymus of Syracuse. It appears that she outlived her sister Deidamia, and was thus the last surviving descendant of the royal house of the Aeacidae. Her name is found in an inscription in the theatre of Syracuse, from which it appears that she bore the title of queen. Justin erroneously supposes her to be a sister of the Deidameia (or Laodameia, as he calls her) who was assassinated by Milon. That she was a daughter of the elder Pyrrhus, see Droysen, vol. ii. p. 275, note.
