= Aeacides of Epirus =

4th century BC king of Epirus, father of Pyrrhus

Aeacides l Of Epirus
- King of Epirus
- Reign: 331 - 313 BC (316-313 Macedonian rule)
- Predecessor: Alexander I of Epirus
- Successor: Alcetas II of Epirus
- Died: 313 BC
- Spouse: Phthia
- Issue: Pyrrhus I of Epirus; Deidamia I of Epirus
- House: Aeacidae
- Father: Arybbas of Epirus
- Mother: Troas (daughter of Neoptolemus I of Epirus)
- Religion: Ancient Greek religion

Aeacides may also refer to Peleus, son of Aeacus, or Achilles, grandson of Aeacus.

Epirus in Antiquity.

Aeacides (Ancient Greek: Αἰακίδης; died 313 BC), King of Epirus (331–316, 313), was a son of King Arybbas and grandson of King Alcetas I.

== Family ==
Aeacides married Phthia, the daughter of Menon of Pharsalus, by whom he had the celebrated son Pyrrhus and two daughters, Deidamia and Troias.

== Reign ==
In 331 BC, on the death of his cousin king Alexander, who was slain in Italy, Aeacides succeeded to the throne of Epirus. In 317 BC he assisted Polyperchon in restoring his cousin Olympias and the five-year-old king Alexander IV to Macedonia. The following year he had to march to the assistance of Olympias, who was hard pressed by Cassander; but the Epirots disliked the military service, rose against Aeacides, and drove him from the kingdom. Pyrrhus, who was then only two years old, was saved by some faithful servants.

In 313 BC, having become tired of the Macedonian rule, the people of Epirus recalled Aeacides (who until then had been campaigning with his old ally Polyperchon in the Peloponnese). Cassander immediately sent an army against him under his brother, Philip.

Philip, who was poised to invade Aetolia, marched his army into Acarnania to prevent Aeacides from linking up with the Aetolians. The Epirote army was interceped and a bloody battle was fought; the Macedonians won, killing many Epirotes and capturing 50 leading supporters of Aeacides, who were sent to Macedon as prisoners. Aeacides, with the remnant of his forces, managed to join the Aetolians. Eventually, Philip caught up with Aeacides and the Aetolians at Oeniadae and defeated them in battle. Aeacides, who was wounded in the battle, died a few days later.

== Sources ==
Preceded by Alexander I	King of Epirus; 331–316 BC	Succeeded by Macedonian Rule
Preceded by Macedonian Rule	King of Epirus; 313 BC	Succeeded by Alcetas II
