= Harmonia of Syracuse =

Harmonia
- Died: 214 BC
- Spouse: Themistius
- Father: Gelo, son of Hiero II

Harmonia was a Sicilian princess of Magna Graecia, daughter of Gelo, the son of King Hiero II of Syracuse. She was the wife of Themistius.

According to Livy, during the Second Punic War the people of Syracuse revolted: the young king Hieronymus was assassinated along with his uncles-in-law, Themistius and Andronodorus. The enraged mob also killed Hiero's daughters, Damarata (wife of Andronodorus) and Heraclia.

As the last living descendant of the tyrant, Harmonia was the next intended victim, but her nurse took steps to save her from the mob. The servant found a servant very similar to Harmonia and dressed her up like her, and the young woman, devoted to her mistress, served as bait for the rebels to ensure the escape of the real princess. However, Harmonia, who witnessed the young woman's death, was moved and disturbed by her handmaid's sacrifice and in response committed suicide.

According to Valerius Maximus, Harmonia did not commit suicide, but to prove the same courage as the girl who voluntarily took her place, she went in front of the murderers, saying she was the real princess, and was also killed.
