= Upper Macedonia =

Western part of ancient Macedonia

Growth of the kingdom of Macedon

Upper Macedonia (Ancient Greek: Ἄνω Μακεδονία, Ánō Makedonía) or Upper Macedon is a geographical and tribal term to describe the upper/western of the two parts in which ancient Macedonia was roughly divided, with Lower Macedonia being the other part. Upper Macedonia consisted geographically of Eordaea, Orestis, Elimiotis with Tymphaea, Lynkestis, and Pelagonia with Derriopos.

These regions had their own rulers and were usually subjects or allies of the Argead kingdom of Lower Macedonia, except for Eordaea that was fully incorporated by the Argeads in an early period. Upper Macedonia was fully annexed to the Macedonian state by Philip II in the mid-4th century BC.

== History ==
During the late Bronze Age numerous matt painted vases have been unearthed in the region that are connected to the middle Helladic ware found southern Greece. This type of ware has been typically used by northwestern Greek tribes. Various unearthed artifacts of that time also point to the possible existence of Mycenaean Greek settlements in Upper Macedonia.

Following the withdrawal of the Bryges in c. 800 BC the local populations of the Eordoi, Elimiotae, Orestae, Lyncestae and Pelagonians formed their separate political entities. As early as the 7th century BC occasional Illyrian invasions against Argead Macedonia inevitably also involved the Upper Macedonian regions of Lynkestis, Orestis, Eordaea, Elimiotis and Tymphaea, because they were located between Illyrian territory and the lands of the Argeads, who were based at Aegae.

The populations of Upper Macedonia shared a common language and a common way of life with that of Lower Macedonia which differed from those inhabiting Illyria and Thrace. The region witnessed occasional raids and Illyrian invasions became a constant threat from the rise of the Argead dynasty until the reign of Philip II of Macedon.

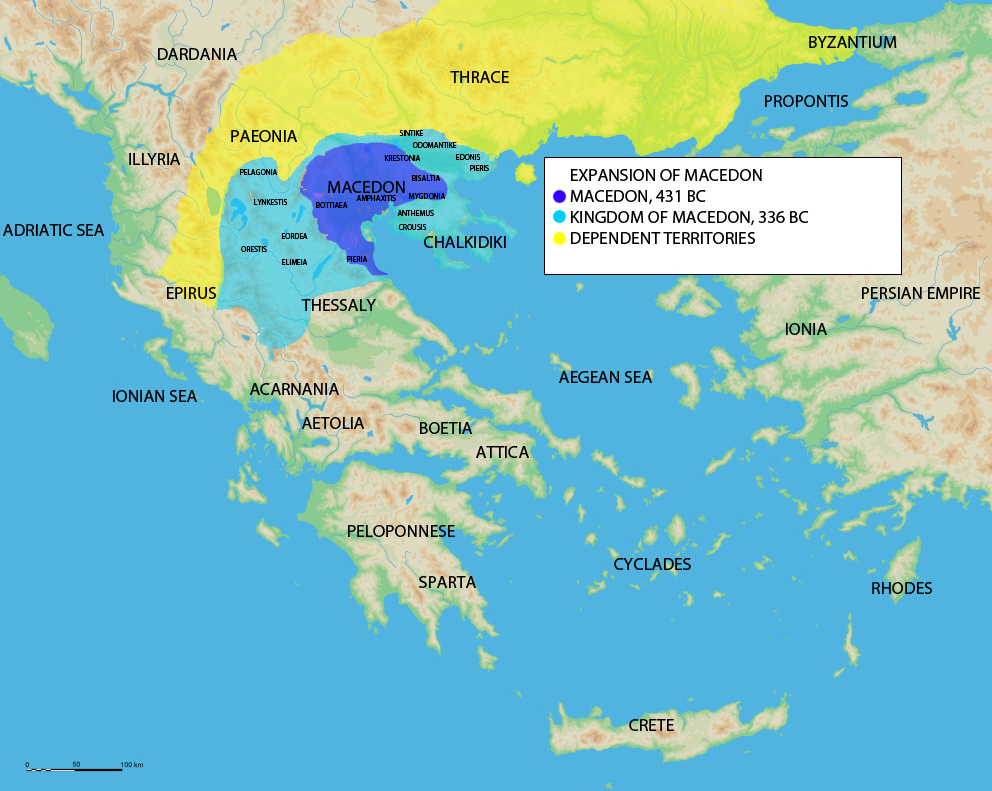
Lynkestis was an autonomous Upper Macedonian kingdom outside the Kingdom of Macedon (blue) until Philip II's expansion (light blue) in the 4th century BC incorporated it into his kingdom.

Unification of Upper and Lower Macedonia into a single kingdom was achieved by Phillip II in the mid-4th century. From that date, its inhabitants were politically equal to Lower Macedonians. Eordaea had been incorporated to the Argead kingdom earlier than the rest of Upper Macedonia, before the reign of Philip II. Upper Macedonia consisted of the regions of Orestis, Elimiotis with Tymphaea, Eordaea, Lynkestis, Pelagonia with Derriopos, Atintania and Dassaretis (although Dassaretis and Atintania belonged to Epirus). Later in 294 BC, Tymphaea and Parauaea were under the control of the kingdom of Epirus of Pyrrhus. Pelagonia was used as a name for the westernmost part of Paionia while the north-westernmost part of Pelagonia was referred to as Derriopos.

Three of the six brigades that Alexander the Great deployed in 330 BC, came from Upper Macedonia, Elimiotis, Orestis together with Lynkestis and Tymphaea. They were led by Coenus from Elimiotis, Perdiccas from Orestis and Amyntas from Tymphaea.

Three major Hellenistic dynasties succeeding Alexander's empire, may have originated from Upper Macedonia; Ptolemy's father Lagus from Eordaea, Antiochus (father of Seleucus I Nicator) from Orestis and Antigonus Monophthalmus from Elimiotis.

=== Language ===
According to N. G. L. Hammond, in the region of Upper Macedonia, the tribes of Pelagones in the region of Prilep, Lyncestae in the region of Florina, Orestae in the region of Kastoria and Elimiotae in the region of Kozani were all Epirotic Molossian tribes and they talked the Northwest Greek dialect. Available inscriptional and ancient literature points that the local population spoke a Northwest Greek dialect in contrast to those of Lower Macedonia whose dialect may have been related more to Aeolic Greek.

== See also ==
- History of Macedonia (ancient kingdom)
- List of ancient Macedonians in epigraphy
- Phiale of Megara
- Ancient Greek geography
- Battle of Upper Macedon (360 BC)
- Battle of Erigon Valley
- Aiani
- Argos Orestiko
- Heraclea Lyncestis

== Sources ==
- Dictionary of Greek and Roman Geography by William Smith, Mahmoud Saba
- JSTOR:Philip II and Upper Macedonia A. B. Bosworth
- Relations between Upper and Lower Macedonia https://web.archive.org/web/20080119020638/http://www.history-of-macedonia.com/wordpress/
- JSTOR: Epigraphes Ano Makedonias -Epigraphical Database
- Dimitrios C. Samsaris, Historical Geography of the Roman province of Macedonia (The Department of Western Macedonia today) (in Greek), Thessaloniki 1989 (Society for Macedonian Studies).ISBN 960-7265-01-7
- Hammond, Nicholas Geoffrey Lemprière (1982). "CHAPTER 40 ILLYRIS, EPIRUS AND MACEDONIA". In Boardman, John; Hammond, Nicholas Geoffrey Lemprière (eds.). The Cambridge Ancient History: The Expansion of the Greek World, Eighth to Sixth Centuries B.C. Vol. III, Part 3 (2nd ed.). Cambridge: Cambridge University Press. pp. 261–285. ISBN 0-521-23447-6.
- Howe, Timothy; Reames, Jeanne (2008). Centering the Periphery (in Macedonian Legacies: Studies in Ancient Macedonian History and Culture in Honor of Eugene N. Borza). Regina Books. ISBN 978-1-930053-56-4.
- Worthington, Ian (2008). Philip II of Macedonia. Yale University Press. ISBN 9780300120790.
