= Alcetas II of Epirus =

4th-century BC king of Epirus

Alcetas II
- king of Epirus
- Reign: 313–306 BC
- Predecessor: Aeacides of Epirus
- Successor: Pyrrhus I of Epirus
- House: Aeacidae
- Father: Arybbas of Epirus
- Mother: Troas (daughter of Neoptolemus I of Epirus)
- Religion: Ancient Greek religion

Alcetas II (Greek: Ἀλκέτας; 313–306 ВС), king of Epirus, was the son of Arybbas, and grandson of Alcetas I. On account of his ungovernable temper, he was banished by his father, who appointed his younger son, Aeacides, to succeed him. On the death of Aeacides, who was killed in a battle fighting against Cassander in 313 BC, the Epirotes recalled Alcetas. Cassander sent an army against him under the command of Lyciscus, but in 312 BC entered into an alliance with him. The Epirotes, incensed at the outrages of Alcetas, rose against him and put him to death, together with his two sons. As a result, in 306 BC Pyrrhus, the son of Aeacides, was placed upon the throne by his protector King Glaukias of the Illyrians.

== Sources ==
Preceded by Aeacides	King of Epirus; 313–306 BC	Succeeded by Pyrrhus I
