= Cleopatra of Macedon =

4th-century BC Macedonian princess and queen regent of Epirus

Cleopatra
- Κλεοπάτρα
- Born: 355/354 BC
- Died: 308 BC
- Spouse: Alexander I of Epirus
- Children: Neoptolemus II of Epirus; Cadmeia of Epirus
- Parents: Philip II of Macedon (father); Olympias (mother)
- Relatives: Alexander the Great (brother); Thessalonike (half-sister); Cynane (half-sister); Philip III of Macedon (half-brother)

Cleopatra of Macedonia (Greek: Κλεοπάτρα της Μακεδονίας; c. 355/354 BC – 308 BC), or Cleopatra of Epirus (Greek: Κλεοπάτρα της Ηπείρου) was an ancient Macedonian princess and later queen regent of Epirus. The daughter of Philip II of Macedon and Olympias of Epirus, she was the only full sibling of Alexander the Great. Her other siblings include half sisters Thessalonike and Cynane, and half-brother Philip III of Macedon.

== Early life ==
Cleopatra grew up in the care of her mother in Pella. Olympias nurtured the familial bond in her children, ensuring they were raised in a "consistent political, moral, and cultural education and experience." Cleopatra, Olympias, Leonidas, and Alexander's friends were Alexander's closest relationships until Alexander was sent to Mieza at 13. In 338 BC, Cleopatra stayed in Pella with her father while her mother Olympias fled to exile in Epirus with her Molossian brother Alexander I of Epirus (Cleopatra's uncle), and Cleopatra's brother Alexander fled to Illyria. Soon Philip felt he had to ally himself to Alexander I by offering his daughter's hand in marriage.

== Rule in Epirus ==
Immediately after her father's murder, Cleopatra and her husband-uncle Alexander went from Macedon back to Epirus. It is believed that the couple had two children, Neoptolemus II of Epirus and Cadmeia (named for her brother's defeat of the Theban revolt which began by attacking the garrison on the Cadmea).

Cleopatra held her brother Alexander's official favor, and likely kept in close contact with him while he was on his conquest to the east. Alexander considered her and Olympias as the inner circle of his basileia. In 332 BC Alexander had sent booty home for both his mother and sister, as well as his close friends. Cleopatra also used her influence to intercede on behalf of the tyrant Dionysius of Heraclea, and addressed the situation on Alexander's behalf.

In 334 BC, Cleopatra's husband crossed the Adriatic Sea to the Italian Peninsula to campaign against several Italic tribes, the Lucanians and Bruttii, on behalf of the Greek colony Taras, leaving her as regent of Epirus. She was involved as recipient and sender of official shipments of grain during a widespread shortage around 334 BC. According to an inscription from Cyrene, Libya, she was the recipient of 50,000 'medimni' of grain, and shipped the surplus to Corinth. Alexander I conquered Heraclea, took Sipontum, and captured both Consentia and Terin, but was eventually killed in battle in 331 BC, leaving the young heir, Neoptolemus too young for the throne.

Cleopatra ruled Epirus in the meantime. It was an Epirote custom that the woman of a family became head of household when her husband died and their son(s) were too young, unlike the rest of Greece. Notably, an embassy from Athens was dispatched to deliver condolences upon her husband's death. While, Alexander the Great expressed uncertainty about the Macedonians being willing to be reigned by a woman, most sources highlight his endorsement of Cleopatra's agency.

Cleopatra seemingly acted as the religious head of state for the people of Molossia. Her name appears on a list of Theorodokoi ("welcomers of sacred ambassadors"), in the recently established Epirote alliance. Cleopatra was significantly the only woman on the list. Her position as official welcomer would have allowed her to keep a finger on whatever was happening anywhere in Greece. Cleopatra may also have been instrumental in implementing her brother's policies regarding grain shipments.

Cleopatra's personal life during this time is not recorded, though Plutarch wrote that Alexander commented that Cleopatra should have some enjoyment out of her basileia when he learned of an affair she had with a handsome young man.

At some point in her rule, Olympias joined Cleopatra as regent, though the extent of their power is unclear. A passage in Plutarch says that Cleopatra and Olympias shared the rule, with Cleopatra ruling Macedonia and Olympias Epirus. This relationship is portrayed as a close political one against Antipater.

Towards the end of her brothers's life, Cleopatra may have given up the Molossian regency entirely. After her brother's death, Cleopatra's status in relation to her mother's was tenuous. They continued to work together politically, and Olympias likely saw Cleopatra's marriage to a general and future children as a way to solidify their safety. Cleopatra's hand was sought in marriage by several of his generals, who thought to strengthen their influence with the Macedonians by a connection with the sister of Alexander the Great. Leonnatus is first mentioned as putting forward a claim to her hand, telling Eumenes that he received a lettered promise of marriage if he came to Pella. Cleopatra had extended her hand because she knew Leonnatus had the ambition and ability to overthrow the new mentally unfit king Philip III of Macedon. Meanwhile Leonnatus, before he arrived for the wedding and in an attempt to enhance his claim to the throne, stopped to lift the siege from the rebellious Greeks in Lamia and rescue Antipater. However he was killed in this action, so the marriage never occurred.

== Time in Sardis and assassination ==
Cleopatra arrived in Sardis in 322/321 BC to marry Perdiccas, but found that he had already proposed to Antipater's daughter, Nicaea. Though Eumenes reportedly promoted Perdiccas's marriage to Cleopatra, Perdiccas's brother, Alcetas, argued against this union. Still, Perdiccas planned to repudiate Nicaea to wed Cleopatra. This, along with Cyanne's murder, turned Antipater and Craterus against the Perdiccas. After his death, her hand was sought by all of Alexander's successors, particularly Cassander, Lysimachus, and Antigonus.

In around 320 BC, a frustrated Antipater publicly scolded Cleopatra for her association with Perdiccas and Eumenes. Cleopatra would not submit so easily, however, and fought back with her own accusations.

Cleopatra remained in Sardis under mysterious circumstances, through the deaths of Antipater, Olympias, Eumenes, Thessalonike's marriage, and her nephews' murders. Many believe that she was kept in honourable captivity by Antigonus, though another theory is that she used her own marriageability and the negative impact of her murder to secure her safety.

In 308 BC, Cleopatra acceded to a proposal of marriage from Ptolemy and fled Sardis. However, before their marriage, she was captured, brought back to Sardis, and assassinated by one of her female attendants, reputedly by order of Antigonus. Despite afterwards executing the assassins and giving her a beautiful funeral in her honor, he knew she represented too much power to remain alive.
