= Alexander I of Epirus =

King of Epirus from 343/2 to 331 BC

Alexander I
- King of Epirus
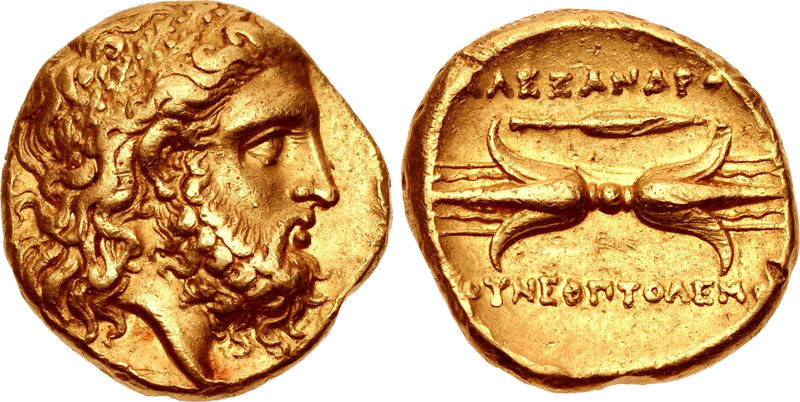
- Coin of Alexander I. Obverse: head of Zeus. Reverse: thunderbolt, caption ΑΛΕΞΑΝΔΡΟY ΤΟΥ ΝΕΟΠΤΟΛΕΜΟΥ.
- Reign: 343/2 - 331 BC
- Predecessor: Arybbas of Epirus
- Successor: Aeacides of Epirus
- Born: c. 370 BC
- Died: 331 BC
- Spouse: Cleopatra of Macedon
- Issue: Neoptolemus II of Epirus; Cadmeia of Epirus
- House: Aeacidae
- Father: Neoptolemus I of Epirus
- Religion: Ancient Greek religion

Alexander I of Epirus (Ancient Greek: Ἀλέξανδρος Α'; c. 370 BC – 331 BC), also known as Alexander the Molossian (Ἀλέξανδρος ὁ Μολοσσός), was a king of Epirus (343/2–331 BC) of the Aeacid dynasty. As the son of Neoptolemus I and brother of Olympias, Alexander I was an uncle and brother-in-law of Alexander the Great. The father of Pyrrhus of Epirus, Aeacides, was also his first cousin.

== Biography ==
Neoptolemus I ruled jointly with his brother Arybbas. When Neoptolemus died in c. 357 BC, his son Alexander was only a child and Arrybas became the sole king. In c. 350 BC, Alexander was brought to the court of Philip II of Macedon in order to protect him and in 343/2 Philip dethroned Arybbas and made Alexander, still in his late 20s, king of Epirus.

When Olympias (the mother of Alexander the Great) was repudiated by her husband, Philip, in 337 BC, she went to her brother and endeavoured to induce him to make war on her husband. Alexander, however, declined the contest, and formed a second alliance with Philip by agreeing to marry his daughter (Alexander's own niece) Cleopatra. During the wedding in 336 BC, Philip was assassinated by Pausanias of Orestis.

== Italian campaign ==
In 334 BC, at the request of the Greek colony of Taras (in Magna Graecia), Alexander crossed over into Italy to aid them in battle against several Italic tribes, including the Lucanians and Bruttii. After a victory over the Samnites and Lucanians near Paestum in 332, he made a treaty with the Romans. He then took Heraclea from the Lucanians, Terina from the Bruttii, and Sipontum on the Adriatic coast. Through the treachery of some Lucanian exiles, he was compelled to engage under unfavourable circumstances in the Battle of Pandosia and was killed by a Lucanian. He left a son, Neoptolemus, and a daughter, Cadmea.

In his famous passage, speculating on what would have been the outcome of a military showdown between Alexander the Great and the Roman Republic, Livy reports that as Alexander of Epirus lay mortally wounded on the battlefield at Pandosia, he compared his fortunes to those of his famous nephew and said that the latter "waged war against women".

Preceded by Arybbas of Epirus	King of Epirus; 343/2–331 BC	Succeeded by Aeacides
