= Deidamia II of Epirus =

Princess of Epirus, last member of the Aeacidae dynasty

Deidamia II
- Queen of Epirus
- Reign: 234 - 233 BC
- Predecessor: Ptolemy of Epirus or Pyrrhus III
- Successor: Epirote Republic
- Died: 233 BC
- House: Aeacidae
- Father: Pyrrhus II of Epirus
- Religion: Ancient Greek religion

Deidamia or Deidameia (Greek: Δηϊδάμεια, Greek: ði.iˈða.mi.a) or Laodamia (Greek: Λαοδάμεια, [La.oˈða.mi.a]) (died 233 BC ) was the Queen regnant of Epirus in 234 – 233 BC. She was the daughter of Pyrrhus II of Epirus, king of Epirus.

After the death of her father and that of her uncle Ptolemy, she was the last surviving representative of the royal Aeacid dynasty in Epirus.

She had a sister, Nereis, who married Gelo of Syracuse. During a rebellion in Epirus, her sister sent her 800 Gallic mercenaries. Part of the Molossians supported her, and with the aid of the mercenaries she briefly took Ambracia.

When the Epirots sued for peace as suppliants, she granted it only on condition that they acknowledged her hereditary rights, and the honours of her ancestors. But some of the Epirots plotted against her and bribed Nestor, one of Alexander's guards, to murder her. Nestor returned without accomplishing his purpose and she fled for refuge in the temple of Artemis Hegemone (Ancient Greek: Ἡγεμόνης Ἀρτέμιδος), but was murdered on the altar in the sanctuary by Milon (Ancient Greek: Μίλων), a man already responsible of killing his own mother Philotera (Ancient Greek: Φιλωτέρα) who shortly after this crime committed suicide. According to Polyaenus, she said to Milon before he murdered her: "Slaughter, thou matricide, on slaughter raise" (Ancient Greek: ὁ μητροφόντης ἐπὶ φόνῳ πράσσει φόνον).

The date of this event cannot be accurately fixed, but it occurred during the reign of Demetrius II in Macedonia (239–229 BC).

== Notes ==
Preceded by Pyrrhus III	Queen of Epirus; 234 BC – 233 BC	Succeeded by Epirote Republic
