= Thesprotus =

In Greek mythology, Thesprotus (Ancient Greek: Θεσπρωτός) may refer to two individuals:

- Thesprotus, an Arcadian prince as one of the 50 sons of the impious King Lycaon either by the naiad Cyllene, Nonacris or by an unknown woman. He was the eponymous hero of Thesprotia. His son was Ambrax eponymous of Ambracia. Thresprotus and his siblings were the most nefarious and carefree of all people. To test them, Zeus visited them in the form of a peasant. They mixed the entrails of a child into the god's meal, whereupon the enraged king of the gods threw the meal over the table. Thesprotus was killed, along with his brothers and their father, by a lightning bolt of the god.
- Thesprotus, king of the country where Lake Avernus is said to be, related to the myth of Atreus and Thyestes. The latter fled to Thesprotus after his brother killed his infant sons. Later on, Atreus met Pelopia, daughter of Thyestes, and thinking that the girl was Thesprotus's daughter, he asked the king to have her be given to him in marriage.
