= Philagrius of Epirus =

Philagrius of Epirus (Greek: Φιλάγριος ὁ Ηπειρώτης; 3rd century CE) was a Greek medical writer from Epirus, who lived after Galen and before Oribasius, and therefore probably in the 3rd century CE. According to the Suda he was a pupil of a physician named Naumachius, and practiced his profession chiefly at Thessalonica.

Theophilus gives him the title of περιοδευτής, periodeut, which probably means a physician who travelled from place to place in the exercise of his profession. He seems to have been well known to the Arabic medical writers, by whom he is frequently quoted, and who have preserved the titles of the following of his works.

1. De Impetigine
2. De iis quae Gingivae Dentibusque accidunt.
3. De iis qui Medico destituuntur.
4. De Morborum Indiciis
5. De Arthritidis Morbo.
6. De Renum vel Vesicae Calculo.
7. De Hepatis Morbo.
8. De Morbo Colico.
9. De Morbo Icterico.
10. De Cancri Morbo.
11. De Morsu Canis.

The Suda says he wrote as many as 70 volumes, but of these works only a few fragments remain, which are preserved by Oribasius, Aëtius, and others. In Cyril's Lexicon he is enumerated among the most eminent physicians.
