= Ambrax =

Greek mythological character

Ambracia in ancient Epirus.

In Greek mythology, Ambrax (/ˈæmbræks/; Ancient Greek: Άμβραξ) may refer to the following personages:

- Ambrax, son of Thesprotus, son of King Lycaon of Arcadia. The town of Ambracia was said to have derived its name from him. Compare with the below character.
- Ambrax, king of the city of Ambracia located in the region of Epirus in ancient Greece. He was the ruler when the exiled Aeneas came to his city. Ambrax was the son of Dexamenus who was in turn the son of Hercules.
