= Alexander II of Epirus =

King of Epirus from 272 BC to 255 BC

Alexander II
- King of Epirus
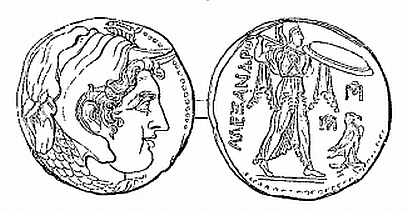
- Illustration of silver tetradrachm of Ptolemy I of Egypt, in the name of Alexander the Great (ca. 310-305 BC). Obverse: youthful head, covered with the skin of elephant's head. Reverse: Pallas Athena, holding spear and shield; before her eagle on thunderbolt.
- Reign: 272 - 255 BC
- Predecessor: Pyrrhus I of Epirus
- Successor: Pyrrhus II of Epirus
- Spouse: Olympias II of Epirus
- Issue: Pyrrhus II of Epirus; Ptolemy of Epirus; Phthia of Macedon
- House: Aeacidae
- Father: Pyrrhus I of Epirus
- Mother: Lanassa of Syracuse
- Religion: Greek paganism

Alexander II (Greek: Άλέξανδρος) was a king of Epirus, and the son of Pyrrhus and Lanassa, the daughter of the Sicilian tyrant Agathocles.

== Reign ==
He succeeded his father as king in 272 BC, and continued the war which his father had begun with Antigonus II Gonatas, whom he succeeded in driving from the kingdom of Macedon. He was, however, dispossessed of both Macedon and Epirus by Demetrius II of Macedon, the son of Antigonus II; upon which he took refuge amongst the Acarnanians. By their assistance and that of his own subjects, who entertained a great attachment for him, he recovered Epirus. It appears that he was in alliance with the Aetolians.

Alexander married his paternal half-sister Olympias, by whom he had two sons, Pyrrhus ΙΙ, Ptolemy ΙΙ and a daughter, Phthia. Beloch places the death of King Alexander II "about 255", and supports this date with an elaborate chain of reasoning. On the death of Alexander, Olympias assumed the regency on behalf of her sons, and married Phthia to Demetrius. There are extant silver and copper coins of this king. The former bear a youthful head covered with the skin of an elephant's head. The reverse represents Pallas holding a spear in one hand and a shield in the other, and before her stands an eagle on a thunderbolt.

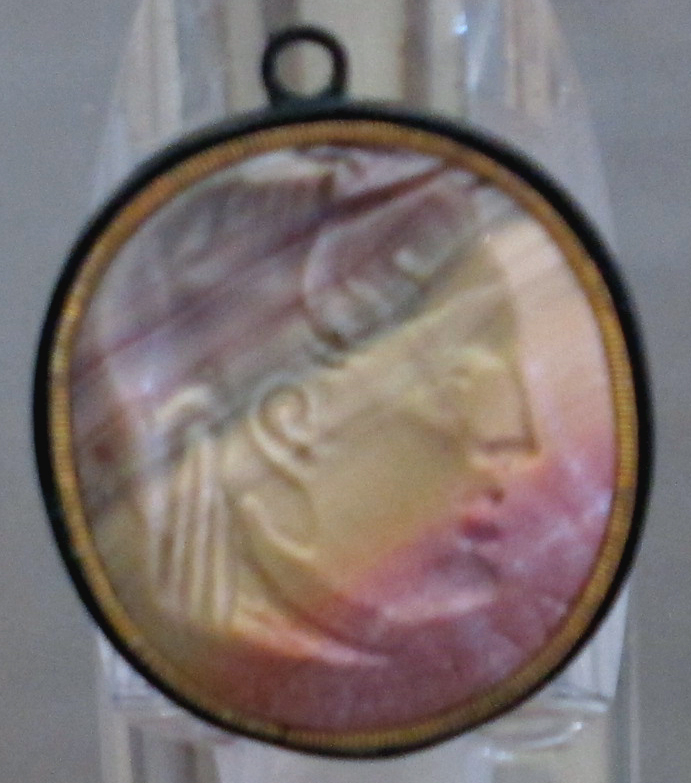
Alexander II of Epirus on a cameo of agate

== Sources ==
- Connop Thirlwall, History of Greece, vol. viii
- Johann Gustav Droysen, Hellenismus
- Benediktus Niese, Geschichte der griechischen und makedonischen Staaten
- Karl Julius Beloch, Griechische Geschichte vol. iii.

Preceded by Pyrrhus I	King of Epirus; 272–255 BC	Succeeded by Pyrrhus II
