= Admetus of Epirus =

5th-century Greek ruler of Epirus

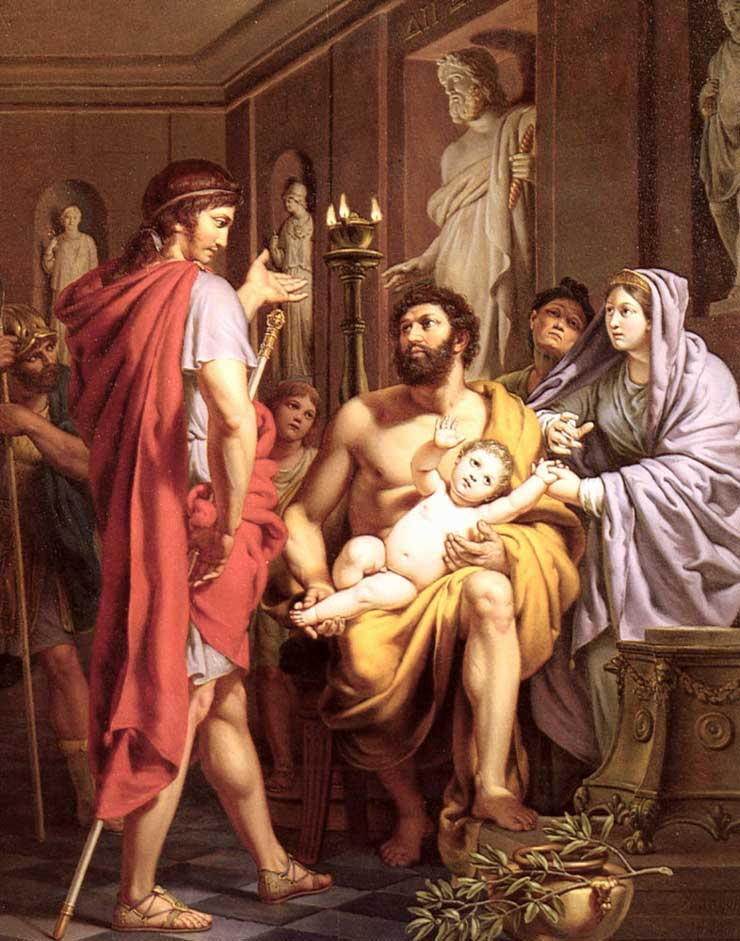
Themistocles with king Admetus.

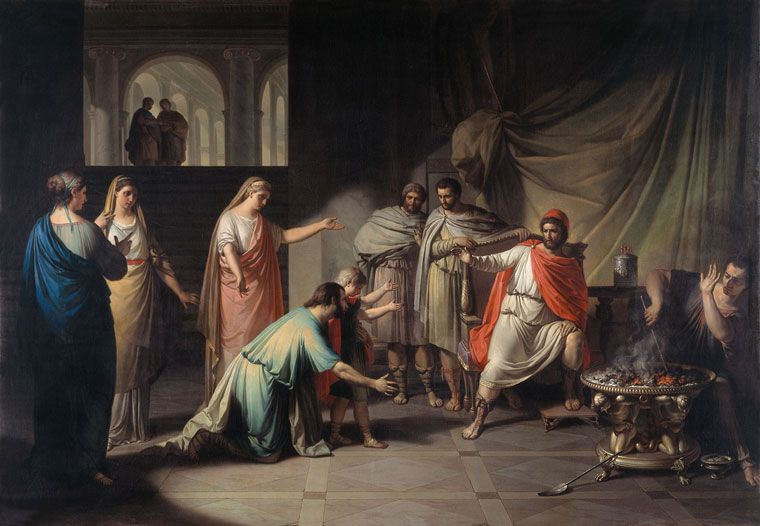
Themistocles finds refuge with King Admetus.

Admetus (Άδμητος; c. 470-430 BC) was king of the ancient Greek tribe of the Molossians at the time that Themistocles (524–459 BC) was the effective ruler of Athens. When Themistocles was in control of Athens, Admetus had opposed him, but without any rancour.

Later Themistocles, when fleeing from the Athenian officers who were ordered to seize him when he had been accused of being a party to the treason of Pausanias, found himself unable to stay in Corcyra. So Themistocles travelled to Epirus and found his only hope of refuge was the house of Admetus. As Admetus was absent, Admetus' queen, Phthia, welcomed Themistocles. On his return to Epirus, Admetus assured Themistocles of his protection.

According to Plutarch, Admetus ignored everything that the Athenian and Lacedaemonian commissioners, who arrived at Epirus soon afterwards, could say; and later Admetus arranged for Themistocles to be safely sent to Pydna on his way to the Persian court.

== Sources ==
Preceded by -	King of Epirus before 430 BC	Succeeded by Tharrhypas
