= Tymphaea =

Ancient Greek territory

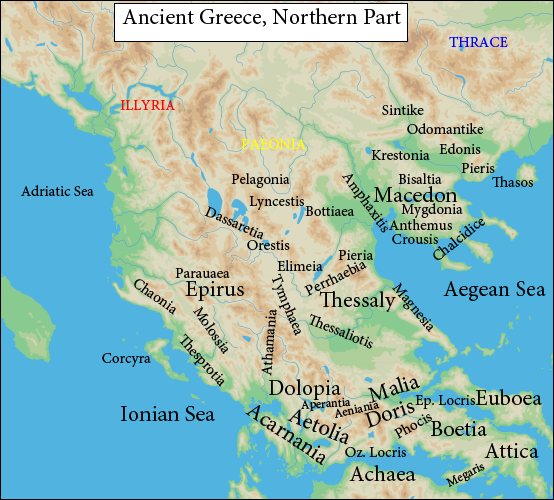
Map showing the ancient regions of central, western and northern Greece

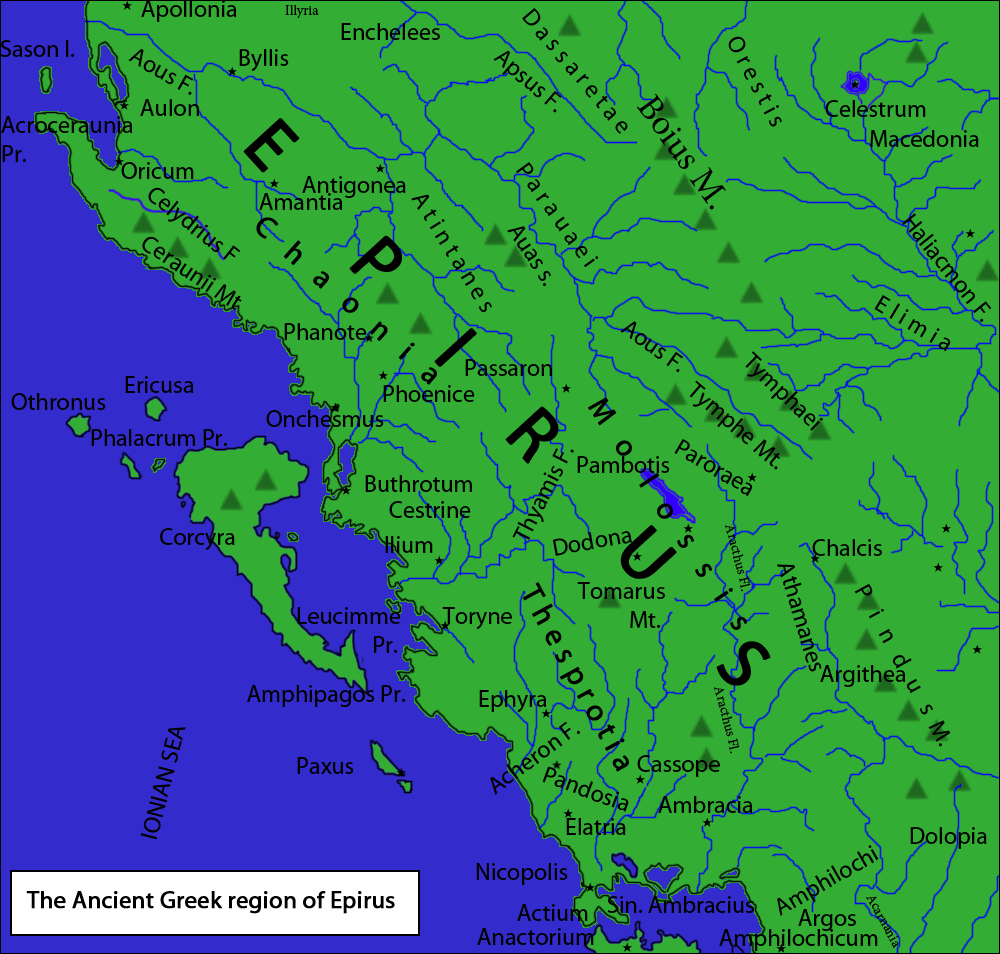
Map of Ancient Greek region of Epirus

Tymphaea or Tymphaia (Ancient Greek: Τυμφαία, romanized: Tymphaía) was an ancient Greek territory, specifically located in the region of Epirus, inhabited by the Tymphaioi, a northwestern Greek tribe that belonged to the Molossian tribal state or koinon. The tribal territory was annexed by and became a province of the Kingdom of Macedon, specifically Upper Macedonia, in the 4th century BC.

== History ==
Due to the fact that Greek toponyms that preserve archaic features are very densely found in the wider area, it appears that speakers of the proto-Greek language inhabited a region which included Tymphaea before the late Bronze Age migrations (late 3rd-early 2nd millennium B.C) during several centuries or even millennia before. Tymphaea and its Greek inhabitants, the Tymphaioi, were named after Mount Tymphe. In circa 350 BC, Tymphaea was conquered by Phillip II (r. 359–336 BC) and incorporated into the Kingdom of Macedon as part of Upper Macedonia. The most famous native of Tymphaea was Polyperchon, regent of Alexander III (r. 336–323 BC). He was the son of Simmias, who was the ruler of the Tymphaioi in circa 370 BC.

The Tymphaei were Epirotans who belonged to the wider Molossian tribe. They were one of the Epirote tribes of the north-western Greek group. They worshipped Zeus under the name "Deipaturos" probably as the god of their mountain, Tymphe.

== See also ==
- Elimiotis
- Parauaea
- Orestis (region)
