= Arybbas of Epirus =

King of Epirus from 370 BC to 343/2 BC

Arribas l Of Epirus
- King of Epirus
- Reign: 370 - 343 BC (with Neoptolemus I until 360 BC)
- Predecessor: Alcetas I of Epirus
- Successor: Alexander I of Epirus
- Spouse: Troas (daughter of Neoptolemus I of Epirus)
- Issue: Alcetas II of Epirus; Aeacides of Epirus
- House: Aeacidae
- Father: Alcetas I
- Religion: Ancient Greek religion

Arybbas (Ancient Greek: Ἀρύββας or Ἀρύβας; ruled 370–343/2 BC) was a king of the Molossians.

== Family ==
Arybbas was a son of Alcetas I, brother of Neoptolemus I and grandfather of Pyrrhus. He married his niece Troas (sister of Olympias).

Arybbas's oldest son was Alcetas II, who reigned as a king of Epirus from 313 BC to 303 BC. It is very probable that the Aryptaeus, king of the Molossians mentioned by Diodorus 18.11.1, who joined the Hellenic cause during the Lamian War, is Arybbas. Arybbas' second son was Aeacides king of Epirus (ruled 331-316, 313 BC).

== Biography ==
Upon the death of their father Alcetas I in 370 BCE, Arybbas and his brother Neoptolemus I divided the kingdom of Epirus in two and each ruled their own part, until Neoptolemus died around 360 BCE and Arybbas became king of all of Epirus.

In c. 360 BC, against an Illyrian attack, Arybbas evacuated his non-combatant population to Aetolia and let the Illyrians loot freely. The stratagem was successful, and the Molossians amassed upon the Illyrians and defeated them. Arybbas ruled Epirus until 343/2 BC, when he was driven into exile by Philip II, who placed Alexander I on the throne.

He was also an Olympic and Pythian victor in tethrippon (chariot race).

Preceded by Alcetas I	King of Epirus; 370–343 BC (with Neoptolemus I until 360 BC)	Succeeded by Alexander I
