= Leonidas of Epirus =

Tutor to Alexander the Great

Leonidas of Epirus (Greek: Λεωνίδας ο Ηπειρώτης) or Leuconides (Greek: Λευκονίδης), was a tutor of Alexander the Great. A kinsman of Alexander's mother, Olympias, he was entrusted with the main superintendence of Alexander's education in his earlier years, apparently before he became a student of Aristotle.

== Teacher ==
Leonidas was a person of austere character, and trained the young prince in laconic discipline. He was said to examine the chests which contained his pupil's bedding and clothes, to see whether Olympias had placed anything there that might minister to luxury. There were two excellent cooks (said Alexander afterwards) with which Leonidas had furnished him,—a night's march to season his breakfast, and a scanty breakfast to season his dinner.

== Advice ==
On one occasion, when Alexander attended a sacrifice, he threw large quantities of incense on the fire, Leonidas admonished him to "be more sparing of it till you have conquered the country where it grows." Alexander sent him afterwards from Asia 600 talents' weight of incense and myrrh, "that he might no longer be penurious" (so ran the message) "in his offerings to the gods."
