= Neoptolemus II of Epirus =

King of Epirus in 3rd century BC

Neoptolemus II
- King of Epirus
- Reign: 302 - 297 BC
- Predecessor: Pyrrhus I of Epirus
- Successor: Pyrrhus I of Epirus
- Died: 297 BC
- House: Aeacidae
- Father: Alexander I of Epirus
- Mother: Cleopatra of Macedon
- Religion: Ancient Greek religion

Neoptolemus II (Greek: Νεοπτόλεμος; died 297 BC) was king of Epirus from 302 BC until his death. He was the son of king Alexander I of Epirus and Cleopatra of Macedonia, his maternal grandparents were Philip II of Macedon and Olympias. His maternal uncles included Alexander the Great and Philip III of Macedon. His maternal aunts included Thessalonike and Cynane.

Neoptolemus came to the throne after the overthrow of his cousin Pyrrhus in 302 BC. However, Pyrrhus returned five years later in 297 BC with the financial and military support of the Egyptian king Ptolemy I. After they initially agreed to rule together as co-kings, Neoptolemus was killed at the behest of Pyrrhus.

Preceded by Pyrrhus I	King of Epirus; 302–297 BC	Succeeded by Pyrrhus I
