= Phthia of Macedon =

Phthia (Ancient Greek: Φθία; lived 3rd century BC) was a daughter of Alexander II (272–260 BC), king of Epirus, and his half-sister Olympias II.

Phthia became the wife of Demetrius II (239–229 BC), king of Macedonia. The match was arranged by her mother Olympias, who was desirous of thus securing the powerful assistance of the Macedonian king to support herself on the throne of Epirus after the death of Alexander. Phthia possibly gave birth to Philip V of Macedon; while it has also been suggested that Chryseis gave birth to him.
