= Parauaea =

Ancient Greek territory

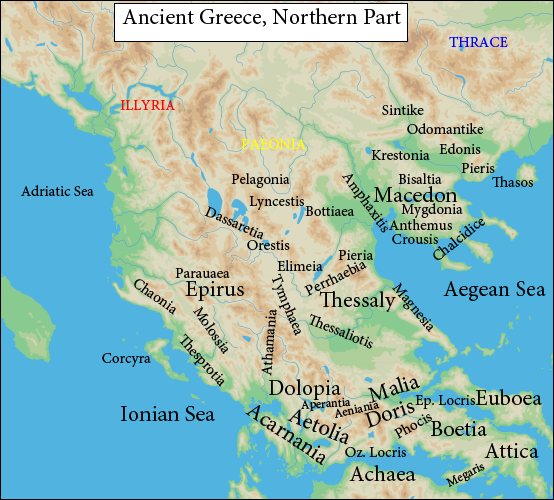
Map showing the ancient regions of central, western and northern Greece.

Parauaea (Greek: Παραυαία) was an ancient Greek territory in the region of Epirus. The inhabitants of the area, a Thesprotian Greek tribe, were known as Parauaioi (Greek: Παραυαῖοι; also Parauaei or Parauaeans), which meant "those dwelling beside" the Aous river.

== History ==
Due to the fact that Greek toponyms that preserve archaic features are very densely found in the wider area (Epirus, western and northern Thessaly and Pieria), it appears that speakers of the Proto-Greek language inhabited a region which included Parauaea before the Late Bronze Age migrations (late 3rd-early 2nd millennium BC).

At the beginning of the Peloponnesian War (429 BC), the Parauaei under the leadership of king Oroidos (Greek: Ὄροιδος) joined forced together with the nearby Orestae as allies of Sparta against Acarnania. That time they were more loosely associated with the adjacent tribes of the Molossians and the Atintanes.

In 350 BC, Parauaea was incorporated into the Greek kingdom of Macedon by Phillip II as part of Upper Macedonia. Later in 294 BC, the area was under the control of Pyrrhus of Epirus. In the 3rd century BC, they are described as a "Thesprotian nation/tribe" by Rhianus and by Stephanus of Byzantium (6th century AD) quoting Rhianus.

== Location ==
Parauaea was among the northern Epirote tribal regions in antiquity.

== See also ==
- Orestis (region)
- Tymphaea
