= Gelo, son of Hiero II =

Gelo (or Gelon) (before 266 BC – 216 BC) was the eldest son of Hiero II, king of Syracuse, Magna Graecia.

Gelo died shortly before his father Hiero, at the age of more than 50 years. Not much is known concerning him, but he appears to have inherited the quiet and prudent character of his father. Polybius records to his praise that he sacrificed all objects of personal ambition to the duty of obedience and reverence to his parents. It seems that Hiero awarded him by associating him to his government and that he even received the title of king.

Livy asserts that, after the huge defeat suffered by the Romans at Cannae, Gelo was preparing to abandon the alliance of Rome for that of Carthage. According to this account, he began making friendly overtures to the cities allied to Rome and might have convinced the entire island of Sicily to defect to the Carthaginian side, had he not died later in the year of 216 BC. However, this seems quite at variance with the statement of Polybius of his uniform submission to his father's views and may very likely deserve as little credit as Livy's insinuation that his death occurred so opportunely, as to cast suspicion upon Hiero being the murderer of his own son.

Gelo was married to Nereis, daughter of Pyrrhus of Epirus, by whom he left a son, Hieronymus, and a daughter, Harmonia, who was married to a Syracusan named Themistus.

Archimedes dedicated to him his treatise The Sand Reckoner, in which he addresses him by the title of king.

The coins referred by earlier writers to the elder Gelon are admitted by some numismatists to belong to this prince. The head on the obverse is possibly that of Gelo himself.
