= Olympias II of Epirus =

3rd-century BC Greek noblewoman

Olympias (in Greek Ὀλυμπιάς, pronounced [olympiás]; lived 3rd century BC) was a Greek queen consort and regent of Epirus.

She was the daughter of Pyrrhus, king of the Greek kingdom of Epirus and his first wife Antigone. She was the wife of her own paternal half-brother Alexander II.

After Alexander's death around 242 BC, she assumed the regency of the kingdom on behalf of her two sons, Pyrrhus II and Ptolemy; and in order to strengthen herself against the Aetolian League, she gave before 239 BC her daughter Phthia in marriage to Demetrius II, king of Macedonia. By this alliance, she secured herself in the possession of the sovereignty, which she continued to administer till her sons were grown to manhood, when she resigned it into the hands of Pyrrhus II.

But the deaths of Pyrrhus II (circa 238) and his brother Ptolemy (circa 235) followed in quick succession, and Olympias herself died of grief for her double loss, according to Justin. By another account, Olympias had poisoned a Leucadian damsel named Tigris, to whom her son Pyrrhus was attached, and was herself poisoned by him in revenge.
