= Epirus (ancient state) =

Former state in Ancient Greece

Epirus Ἄπειρος Ápeiros
- 330–167 BC
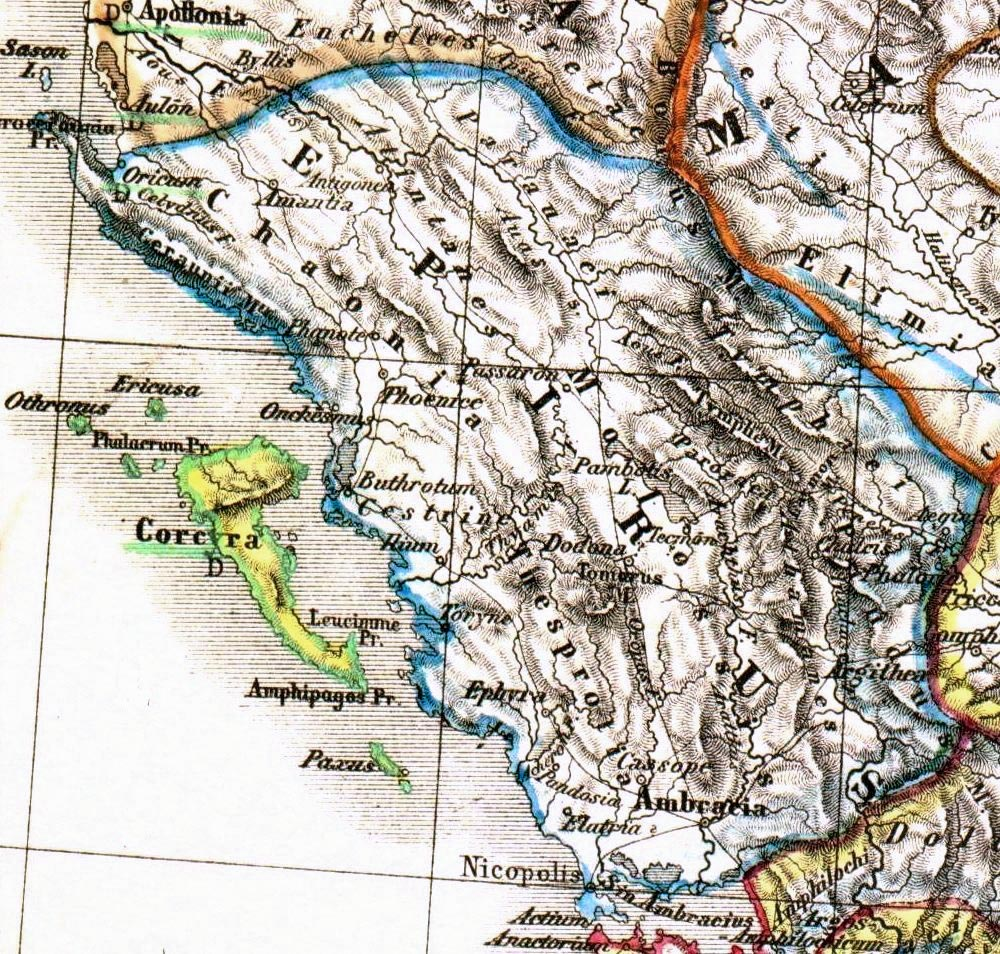
- Capital: Passaron (330–295 BC); Ambracia (295–224 BC); Phoenice (224–167 BC); Dodona (religious)
- Common languages: Epirote Greek
- Religion: Ancient Greek religion, Hellenistic religion
- Government: Monarchy (330–231 BC); Federal republic (231–167 BC)
- King
  - 330–313 BC: Aeacides
  - 307–302 BC: Pyrrhus of Epirus
  - 302–297 BC: Neoptolemos II
  - 297–272 BC: Pyrrhus of Epirus
  - 231–167 BC: Epirote League
- Historical era: Classical antiquity
  - Epirote tribes established united political entity: 330 BC
  - Pyrrhus' campaign in Italy: 280–275 BC
  - Monarchy abolished: 231 BC
  - Conquered by the Roman Republic in the Third Macedonian War: 167 BC
- Currency: Epirote drachma
Preceded by
Molossians
Thesprotians
Chaonians
Succeeded by
Macedonia (Roman province)

Epirus (/ɪˈpaɪrəs/; Epirote Greek: Ἄπειρος, Ápeiros; Attic Greek: Ἤπειρος, Ḗpeiros) was an ancient Greek kingdom, and later republic, located in the geographical region of Epirus, in parts of north-western Greece and southern Albania. Home to the ancient Epirotes, the state was bordered by the Aetolian League to the south, Thessaly and Upper Macedonia to the east, and Illyrian tribes to the north. The Epirote king Pyrrhus is known to have made Epirus a powerful state in the wider Hellenistic world (during 297–272 BC) that was comparable to the likes of Macedon and Rome. Pyrrhus' armies also confronted Rome during their unsuccessful campaign in what is now modern-day Italy.

== Etymology ==
The Greek toponym Epirus (Greek: Ήπειρος), meaning "mainland" or "continent", first appears in the work of Hecataeus of Miletus in the 6th century BC. It is one of the few Greek names from the view of an external observer with a maritime-geographical perspective. Although a foreign name, Epirus later came to be adopted by the inhabitants of the area.

== History ==
=== Prehistory ===
A number of Mycenaean remains have been found in Epirus at the most important ancient religious sites in the region, including at the Necromanteion of Acheron (on the Acheron river) and at the Oracle of Zeus at Dodona. It is also known that Epirus had strong contact with other Ancient Greek regions, including those of Macedonia, Thessaly, Aetolia and Acarnania.

By the early 1st millennium BC three principal clusters of Greek-speaking tribes emerged in Epirus. These were the Chaonians of northwestern Epirus, the Molossians in the center, and the Thesprotians in the south. The region inhabited by each of these ethne had its own name (Chaonia, Molossia, Thesprotia), thus there was no single name for the entire region originally.

=== Molossian expansion (370–330 BC) ===
The Molossian Aeacidae dynasty managed to create the first centralized state in Epirus from about 370 BC onwards, expanding their power at the expense of rival tribes. The Aeacids allied themselves with the increasingly powerful kingdom of Macedon, in part against the common threat of Illyrian raids, and in 359 BC the Molossian princess Olympias, niece of Arybbas of Epirus, married King Philip II of Macedon (r. 359–336 BC). She was to become the mother of Alexander the Great and Cleopatra of Macedon. On the death of Arybbas, Alexander the Molossian, uncle of Alexander the Great of Macedon, succeeded to the throne with the title King of Epirus.

In 334 BC, the time Alexander the Great crossed into Asia, Alexander the Molossian led an expedition in southern Italy in support of the Greek cities of Magna Graecia against the nearby Italian tribes and the emerging Roman Republic. After some successes on the battlefield, he was defeated by a coalition of Italic tribes at the Battle of Pandosia in 330 BC.

=== Kingdom of Epirus (330–231 BC) ===
Campaigns of Pyrrhus in Italy

In 330 BC, upon Alexander the Molossian's death, the term "Epirus" appears as a single political unit in the ancient Greek records for the first time, under the leadership of the Molossian dynasty. Subsequently, the coinages of the three major Epirote tribal groups came to an end, and a new coinage was issued with the legend Epirotes. After Alexander's I death, Aeacides of Epirus, who succeeded him, espoused the cause of Olympias against Cassander, but was dethroned in 313 BC. In 330 BC, Passaron became the capital of the united kingdom of Epirus until 295 BC, when Pyrrhus moved the capital to Amvrakia.

Aeacides's son Pyrrhus came to the throne in 295 BC. Pyrrhus, being a skillful general, was encouraged to aid the Greeks of Tarentum and decided to initiate a major offensive in the Italian Peninsula and Sicily. Due to its superior martial abilities, the Epirote army defeated the Romans in the Battle of Heraclea (280 BC). Subsequently, Pyrrhus's forces nearly reached the outskirts of Rome, but had to retreat to avoid an unequal conflict with a more numerous Roman army. The following year, Pyrrhus invaded Apulia (279 BC) and the two armies met in the Battle of Asculum where the Epirotes won the eponymous Pyrrhic victory, at a high cost.

In 277 BC, Pyrrhus captured the Carthaginian fortress in Eryx, Sicily. This prompted the rest of the Carthaginian-controlled cities to defect to Pyrrhus. Meanwhile, he had begun to display despotic behavior towards the Sicilian Greeks and soon Sicilian opinion became inflamed against him. Though he defeated the Carthaginians in battle, he was forced to abandon Sicily.

Pyrrhus's Italian campaign came to an end following the inconclusive Battle of Beneventum (275 BC). Having lost the vast majority of his army, he decided to return to Epirus, which finally resulted in the loss of all his Italian holdings. Because of his costly victories, the term "Pyrrhic victory" is often used for a victory with devastating cost to the victor.

=== Epirote League (231–167 BC) ===
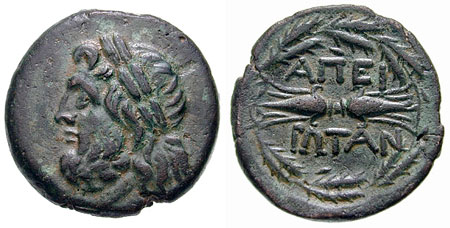
Coin of the Epirote League, depicting Zeus (left) and a lightning bolt with the word ΑΠΕΙΡΩΤΑΝ 'of the Epirotes' (right)

In 233 BC, the last surviving member of the Aeacid royal house, Deidamia, was murdered. Her death brought the Epirote royal family to an abrupt extinction and a federal republic was set up, though with diminished territory, since western Acarnania had asserted its independence, and the Aetolians seized Ambracia, Amphilochia, and the remaining land north of the Ambracian Gulf. The new Epirote capital was therefore established at Phoenice, the political center of the Chaonians. The reasons for the swift fall of the Aeacid dynasty were probably complex. Aetolian pressure must have played a part, and the alliance with Macedonia may have been unpopular; in addition, there were perhaps social tensions. However, Epirus remained a substantial power, unified under the auspices of the Epirote League as a federal state with its own parliament (or synedrion).

In the following years, Epirus faced the growing threat of the expansionist Roman Republic, which fought a series of wars with Macedonia. The League remained neutral in the first two Macedonian Wars but split in the Third Macedonian War (171–168 BC), with the Molossians siding with the Macedonians and the Chaonians and Thesprotians siding with Rome. The outcome was disastrous for Epirus; Molossia fell to Rome in 167 BC and 150,000 of its inhabitants were enslaved.

== Organization ==
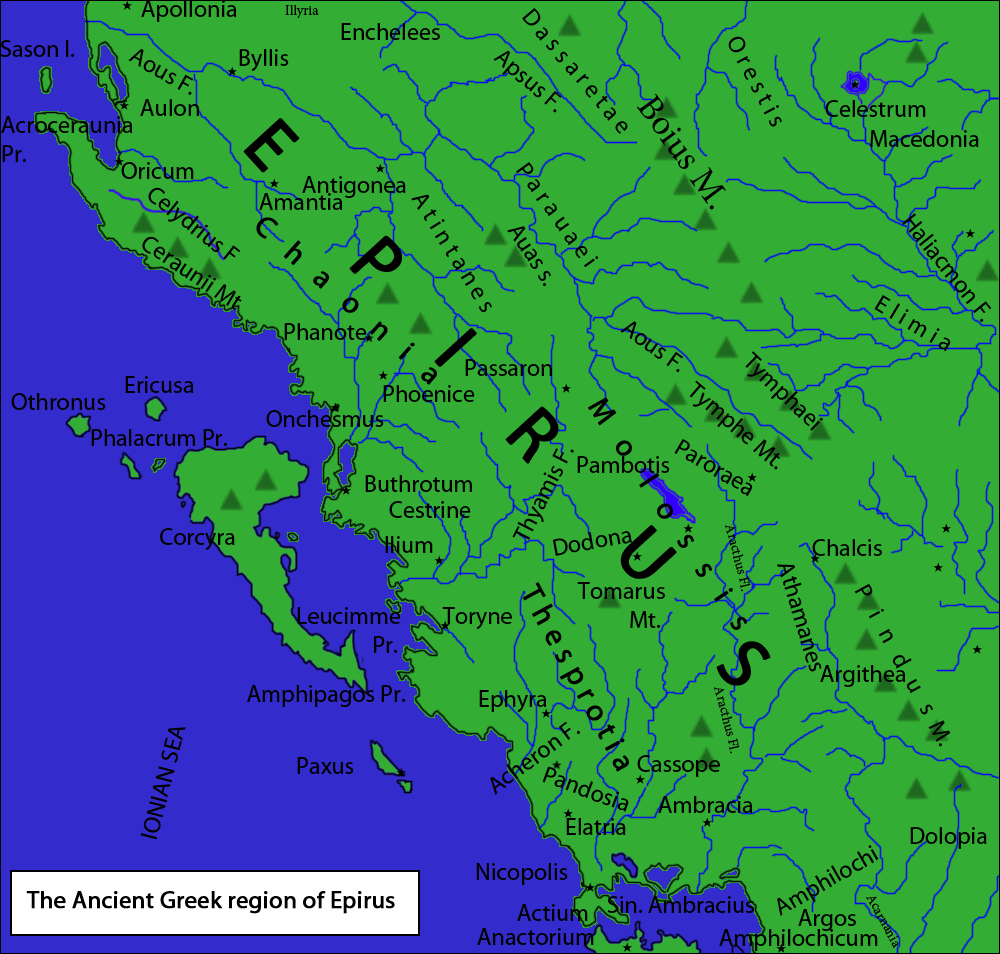
Map of Ancient Greek region of Epirus

In antiquity, Epirus was settled by the same nomadic Hellenic tribes that went on to settle the rest of Greece. Unlike most other Greeks of the time, who lived in or around city-states such as Athens or Sparta, the Epirotes lived in small villages and their way of life was foreign to that of polis of southern Greeks. Their region lay on the edge of the Greek world and was far from peaceful; for many centuries, it remained a frontier area contested with the Illyrian peoples of the Adriatic coast and interior. However, Epirus had a far greater religious significance than might have been expected given its geographical remoteness, due to the presence of the shrine and oracle at Dodona – regarded as second only to the more famous oracle at Delphi. Plutarch writes a story that was related to him, according to which, the Molossian king Tharrhypas was the first in his dynasty to become renowned, as he organized his cities on a system of Greek customs, rules and regulations. He was probably responsible for the earliest known decrees of the Molossian state in 370–368 BC, during the reign of his grandson Neoptolemus I; though, the institutions originated much earlier, and the dialect in which they are written is not, as was believed, the Doric of the Corinthian colonies, but a Northwest Greek dialect with several distinctive features, so as to rule out the case of it having been borrowed.

== Culture ==
Map of Ancient Greek dialects, with Epirus in the top left

At least since classical antiquity, the Epirotes were speakers of an epichoric Northwest Greek dialect, Epirote Greek, different from the Dorian of the Greek colonies on the Ionian islands, and bearers of mostly Greek names, as evidenced by epigraphy and literary evidence.

Nicholas Hammond argues that the principal social structure of the Epirotes was the tribe and that they spoke a West-Greek dialect. Tom Winnifrith (1983) argues that the Epirotes became culturally more closely connected to the rest of the Greek world during the centuries that preceded the Roman conquest of the region (3rd-2nd century BC), while hellenisation process continued even after the conquest. As such their rulers claimed Greek descent. Old genealogical links through the stories about the return voyages of the Greek heroes from Troy (nostoi) and other Greek myths strongly connected Epirus with the rest of Greece and these stories prevented any serious debate about the Greekness of the Epirotes, including the Molossians. The language they spoke was regarded as a primitive Northwestern Greek dialect, but there was no question that it was Greek. The way of life in Epirus was more archaic than that in the Corinthian and Corcyrean colonies on the coast, but there was never a discussion about their Greekness.

Homer mentions the oracle of Dodona, which was located in the territory of Classical Epirus, with Panhellenic acclaim. The Athenian historian Thucydides described the inhabitants as "barbarians" in his History of the Peloponnesian War; and Strabo in his Geography, seems to imply that Epirus was not originally a proper part of the Greek world. Other historians, such as Dionysius of Halicarnassus, Pausanias, and Eutropius considered the Epirotes proper Greeks, while Aristotle considered Epirus as the cradle of the Greeks. Simon Hornblower interprets the vague, and sometimes even antithetical, comments of Thucydides on the Epirotes as implying that they were neither completely "barbarian" nor completely Greek, but akin to the latter. Notably, Thucydides had similar views about the neighboring Aetolians and Acarnanians, even though the evidence leaves no doubt that they were Greek. The term "barbarian" may have denoted not only clearly non-Greek populations, but also Greek populations on the fringe of the Greek world with peculiar dialects. The ancient historians and geographers did not follow the scientific methods of modern linguists, who record in detail the speech of the groups they study; their information was based, more rarely on personal experiences, and mostly on the impressions of each of their informants, who as a rule, had neither philological training nor particularly linguistic interests. A far more reliable source on the views of the Greeks is the list of sacred envoys (Ancient Greek: θεαρόδοκοι) in Epidaurus, which includes the Epirotes. The list which was compiled in 360 BC includes the sacred envoys (members of the ruling family of each tribe or subtribe) of the Molossians, Kassopeans, Chaonians and Thesprotians. Only communities that considered themselves Greek and were considered so by others were allowed to participate at these great Panhellenic festivals.

In terms of religion they worshiped the same gods as the rest of the Greeks. No traces of non-Greek deities were found until the Hellenistic age (with the introduction of oriental deities in the Greek world). Their supreme deity was Zeus and the Oracle of Dodona found in the land of the Molossians attracted pilgrims from all over the Greek world. As with the rest of the Epirotes they were included in the thearodokoi catalogues where only Greeks were allowed in order to participate in Panhellenic Games and festivals. Aristotle considered the region around Dodona to have been part of Hellas and the region where the Hellenes originated. Plutarch mentions an interesting cultural element of the Epirotes regarding the Greek hero Achilles. In his biography of King Pyrrhus, he states that Achilles "had a divine status in Epirus and in the local dialect he was called Aspetos" (meaning "unspeakable" or "unspeakably great" in Homeric Greek).

== See also ==
- List of cities in ancient Epirus
- List of ancient Epirotes
