= Tharrhypas =

King of Epirus from 430 BC to 392 BC

- King of Epirus
- Reign: 430–392 BC
- Predecessor: Admetus of Epirus
- Successor: Alcetas I of Epirus
- Born: Tharrhypas
- Issue: Alcetas I of Epirus
- House: Aeacidae
- Father: Admetus of Epirus
- Religion: Ancient Greek religion

Tharrhypas (Greek: Θαρύπας or Θάρυψ) was a king of the Molossians and the great-great- grandfather of Alexander the Great. He was the father of Alcetas I, and is said to have been the first to introduce southern Greek (namely Attic) cultural traits among Molossians.

Thucydides mentions that Tharrhypas was a minor in 429 BC and that his guardian was Sabylinthus.

During his time, the Molossian tribe emerged from political obscurity and began to play an important role in the political scene of Epirus. Tharrhypas made substantial reforms (legislative, political, etc.), which formed the basis for the modernization of the Molossian state.

Preceded by Admetus	King of Epirus; 430–392 BC	Succeeded by Alcetas I
