= Alcetas I of Epirus =

King of Epirus from 390/385 BC to 370 BC

Alcetas I
- King of Epirus
- Reign: 390 - 370 BC
- Predecessor: Tharrhypas
- Successor: Neoptolemus I of Epirus
- Issue: Neoptolemus I of Epirus; Arybbas
- House: Aeacidae
- Father: Tharrhypas
- Religion: Ancient Greek religion

Alcetas I (Greek: Ἀλκέτας) (390/385 – 370 BC) was a king of Epirus. He was the son of Tharrhypas.

== Biography ==
Alcetas was expelled from his kingdom for unknown reasons, and took refuge with Dionysius I of Syracuse, who assisted him in being reinstated.

After Alcetas' restoration, he allied himself with the Athenians and with Jason of Pherae, the Tagus of Thessaly. In 373 BC he appeared in Athens with Jason, for the purpose of defending the Athenian general Timotheus, who, through their influence, was acquitted.

Upon Alcetas' death, the kingdom was divided between his two sons, Neoptolemus I and Arybbas.

== Sources ==
Preceded by Tharrhypas	King of Epirus; 390–370 BC	Succeeded by Neoptolemus I and Arybbas
