= Battle of Pandosia =

Ancient battle between the Greeks and the Italians

Date	331 BC
Location	Near Pandosia, present-day Italy
Result	Decisive Italic victory

Belligerents
Epirus	Lucanians; Bruttians

Commanders and leaders
Alexander I of Epirus †	Lucanian general †

The Battle of Pandosia was fought in 331 BC between a Greek force led by Alexander I of Epirus against the Lucanians and Bruttians, two southern Italic tribes. The Italic army soundly defeated the invading Greeks and killed Alexander I of Epirus during the battle.

== Background ==
Alexander had arrived in Southern Italy with his army in 334 or 333 BC. He desired to emulate the conquests in the east by his nephew, Alexander the Great, in the west. A call for help from Tarentum, which was at war with the Bruttians, provided the occasion for the expedition. Ancient historians also allege that Alexander was warned by the oracle of Zeus at Dodona that he should beware of the river Acheron and the city Pandosia. Alexander assumed the oracle meant the river and city in Epirus. This encouraged him further to leave for Southern Italy, so he would be as far away from the river and city in Epirus as possible.

He won a war with the Bruttians and the Lucanians in Southern Italy and captured several cities. Justin mentions he made alliances with Metapontum, the Peucetians, and Rome. Livy writes the alliance with Rome was made after Alexander had driven the Samnites into Lucania, marched into Lucania from Paestum and defeated the Samnites and Lucanians in a pitched battle. The campaign against the Bruttians and Lucanians was followed by two separate campaigns against the Messapians and the Daunians.

Justin does not mention the cities Alexander conquered, but Livy is more specific. According to him, he took the Tarantine colony Heraclea from the Lucanians; Sipontum which belonged to the Daunians; the Bruttian towns Cosentia, Terina and several more Messapian and Lucanian towns. He sent three hundred noble families back to Epirus as hostages. However, the Bruttians and the Lucanians raised reinforcements from their neighbors and declared war on him again.

Metapontum must have been one of the cities he captured from the Messapians, for otherwise an alliance with the city would not have been possible. Michael P. Fronda argues the mention of an alliance with Metapontum is curious and implies conquest rather than liberation from the Messapians. Tarentum probably would have welcomed the seizure of Metapontum and Heraclea initially because it gave them an opportunity to extend their dominion over those two cities. Later on the relations between Tarentum and Alexander clearly became strained however. Strabo writes that Alexander tried to transfer a panhellenic festival from Heraclea to Thurii out of enmity with Tarentum. Furthermore, he claims the defeat of Alexander at Pandosia was blamed on Tarentum. Ian Spence thinks he probably no longer received support from Tarentum when he was at Pandosia.

== Battle ==
In 331 BC, Alexander positioned himself near Pandosia, which was located on the border of Lucania and Bruttium. This position was advantageous because it allowed him a multitude of routes to invade the territory of Bruttians and Lucanians. Strabo describes the location of Pandosia as "above" Cosentia, but still in Bruttium.

Alexander had encamped his army on three hills which stood a small distance apart from each other. He was accompanied by two hundred Lucanian exiles. After continuous rainfall the fields were flooded and the three hills became isolated. The three parts of the army were now unable to reinforce each other. At this time the Lucanians and Bruttians attacked, surprised, and destroyed the two parts of the army which were separated from the king. They proceeded to blockade the remaining hill where Alexander encamped.

The Lucanian exiles sent messengers to their countrymen and promised that they would turn over Alexander, dead or alive, on the condition that they would be restored to their property. Alexander managed to break out of the siege with a small group, killing the Lucanian general in the process. He rallied his forces and intended to escape through a river ford. When he heard the river was called the Acheron (possibly a small tributary of the Neaethus) he remembered the warning of the oracle. He had failed to realize there was a city and river of the same name in Italy. He hesitated to cross, but when he saw the Lucanians approaching in pursuit, he directed his horse through the stream. A Lucanian exile caught up to him and threw a javelin which impaled the king.

== Aftermath ==
According to Justin, the city of Thurii ransomed the body of Alexander at public expense and buried it. Livy gives a different account and describes that his body was mutilated and cut in half by the victors. They sent one half to Cosentia and pelted the other half with javelins and stones. An anonymous woman persuaded them to stop because she hoped to exchange the body of the king for the return of her husband and children, who were sent to Epirus as hostages. She had the remains of the corpse cremated at Cosentia and sent back the bones to the Epirote garrison at Metapontum. From there they were sent back to Epirus, to Alexander's wife Cleopatra and his sister Olympias.

The Battle of Pandosia's significance is threefold. First, it marks the beginning of the end for Greek colonization in Southern Italy. After the battle, Greek colonization of Italy ceased, and existing Greek city states found themselves under pressure from the Oscan tribes.

Second, the battle marked the first time in over a hundred years that the massively successful Greco-Macedonian phalanx battle formation saw defeat. The Italians defeated the phalanx by forcing the Greek forces to do battle on uneven, hilly territory. The Italian fighters, armed only with short swords and small shields, fought in small companies (later called "maniples" in Latin), that featured maximum speed and manoeuvrability. They easily outflanked the less manoeuvrable Greek fighters in phalanx formation. Until the end of the Roman Empire, gladiator shows featured a style of fighter bearing the distinctive Southern Italian battle gear. The Romans called this style, unsurprisingly, the Samnite.

Lastly, the battle is generally credited as the one which showed the Romans how to defeat Greek armies. The Romans later employed modified Samnite tactics with great success as they subdued the Mediterranean.

== Notes ==
1. Justin mentions the Bruttians, but Strabo mentions the Messapians and Lucanians instead.
2. Some sources date the battle to 326 BC, but Jona Lendering argues that this must be a confusion with the year when the news of Alexander the Great's death reached Rome. Livy mentions that the battle took place in the same year that Alexandria was founded, which can be reliably dated to 331 BC.

== Sources ==
=== Primary sources ===
- Justin (1853). Watson, John Selby (ed.). Epitome of the Philippic History of Pompeius Trogus. London: Henry G. Bohn.
- ——— (1997). Yardley, J. C.; Heckel, Waldemar (eds.). Epitome of the Philippic History of Pompeius Trogus. Vol. 1. Oxford: Oxford University Press. ISBN 978-0-198-14907-1.
- Livy (1926). Foster, B. O. (ed.). History of Rome. Vol. 4. Cambridge, Massachusetts: Harvard University Press. ISBN 978-0-674-99210-8.
- Plutarch (1936). Babbitt, Frank Cole (ed.). Moralia. Vol. 4. Cambridge, Massachusetts: Harvard University Press. ISBN 978-0-674-99336-5.
- Strabo (1924). Jones, H. L. (ed.). Geography. Vol. 3. Cambridge, Massachusetts: Harvard University Press. ISBN 978-0-674-99201-6.

=== Secondary sources ===
- Fronda, Michael P. (2010). Between Rome and Carthage: Southern Italy During the Second Punic War. Cambridge, United Kingdom: Cambridge University Press. ISBN 978-1-139-48862-4.
- Lendering, Jona (2008). "Alexander of Molossis". Livius.
- Spence, Ian G. (2002). Historical Dictionary of Ancient Greek Warfare. Folkestone: Scarecrow Press. ISBN 978-0-810-86612-6.
