= Epirus =

Historical region in the Balkans

Epirus Greek: Ήπειρος Albanian: Epir/Epiri Aromanian: Epiru
- Historical region
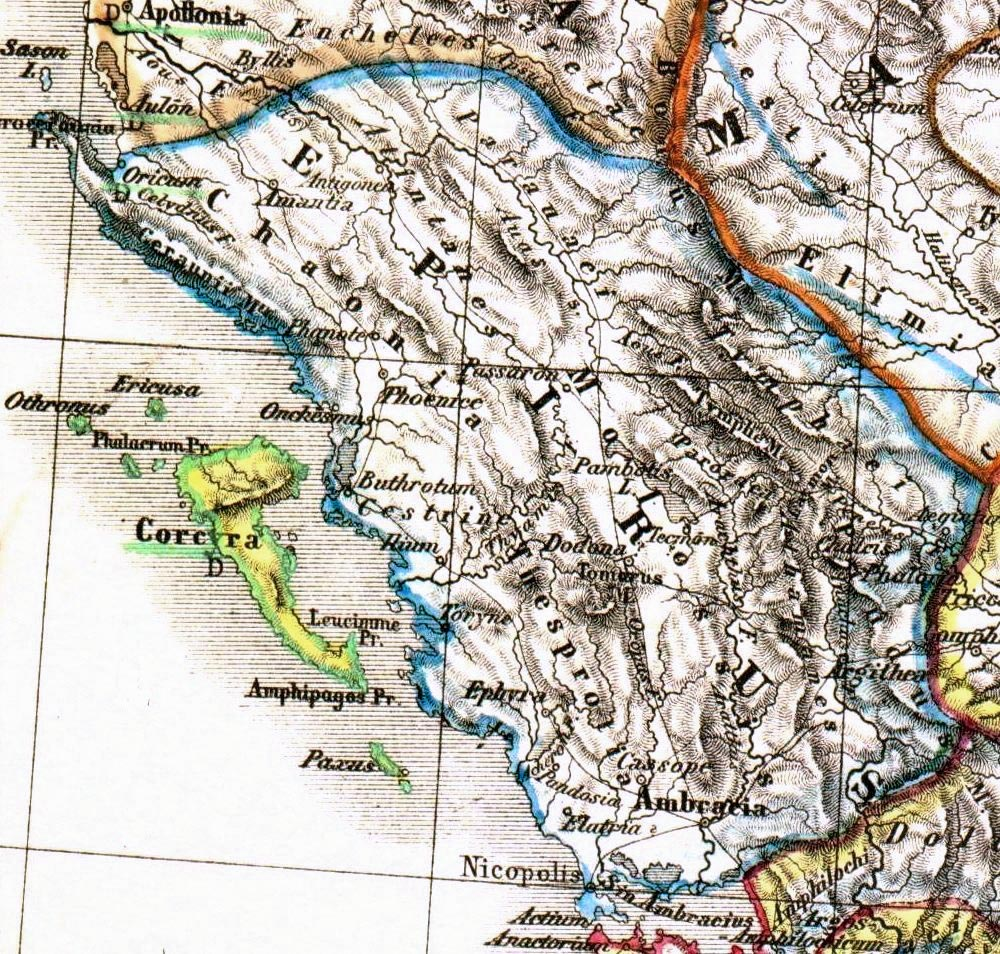
- Map of ancient Epirus by Heinrich Kiepert, 1902
- Present status: shared between northwestern Greece (region of Epirus) and southern Albania (counties of Gjirokastër and Vlorë)
- Demonym: Epirote
- Time zones: Central European Time
- Eastern European Time

Epirus (/ɪˈpaɪrəs/) is a geographical and historical region in southeastern Europe, now shared between Greece and Albania. Classical Epirus roughly lay between the Pindus Mountains in the east and the Ionian Sea in the west, and between the Acroceraunian Mountains in the north and the Ambracian Gulf in the south. It is currently divided between the region of Epirus in northwestern Greece and the counties of Gjirokastër and Vlorë in southern Albania. The largest city and seat of the Greek administrative region of Epirus is Ioannina.

A rugged and mountainous region, in classical antiquity Epirus was the north-west area of ancient Greece. It was inhabited by the Greek tribes of the Chaonians, Molossians, and Thesprotians. It was home to the sanctuary of Dodona, the oldest oracle in ancient Greece, and the second most prestigious after Delphi. Unified into a single state in 370 BC by the Aeacidae dynasty, Epirus achieved fame during the reign of Pyrrhus of Epirus who fought the Roman Republic in a series of campaigns. Epirus subsequently became part of the Roman Republic along with the rest of Greece in 146 BC, which was followed by the Roman Empire and Eastern Roman Empire.

Following the sack of Constantinople by the Fourth Crusade (1204), Epirus became the center of the Despotate of Epirus, one of the successor states to the Byzantine Empire. In the 14th century, Epirus was brought under the rule of the restored Byzantine Empire, before being briefly conquered by the Serbian Empire. The region was then divided amongst a number of despotates and political entities, including the Despotate of Epirus, the Despotate of Arta, the Zenebishi family, and the Republic of Venice, before being conquered by the Ottoman Empire in the 15th century. Epirus became part of the semi-independent Pashalik governed by the Ottoman Albanian ruler Ali Pasha in the early 19th century, but the Sublime Porte re-asserted its control in 1821. Following the Balkan Wars and World War I, southern Epirus became part of Greece, while northern Epirus became part of Albania.

== Name and etymology ==
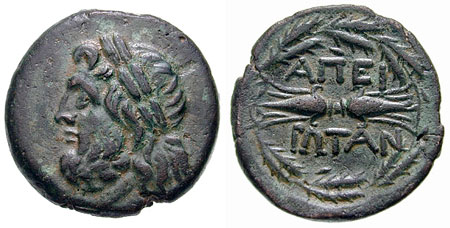
Coin of the Epirote League, depicting Zeus (left) and a lightning bolt with the word "ΑΠΕΙΡΩΤΑΝ" 'of the Epirotes' (right)

The name Epirus is the Latin name of the region, derived from the Ancient Greek: Ἤπειρος, romanized: Ḗpeiros (Doric Greek: Ἄπειρος, romanized: Ápeiros), meaning "mainland" or terra firma. It is thought to come from an Indo-European root *apero- 'coast', and was applied by the Ancient Greeks to the territory opposite Corfu and the Ionian islands. The name first appears in the work of Hecataeus of Miletus in the 6th century BC and is one of the few Greek names from the view of an external observer with a maritime-geographical perspective. Although a foreign name, it later came to be adopted by the inhabitants of the area, and it was struck on the coinage of the unified Epirote commonwealth: "ΑΠΕΙΡΩΤΑΝ" (Ancient Greek: Ἀπειρωτᾶν, romanized: Āpeirōtân, Attic Greek: Ἠπειρωτῶν, romanized: Ēpeirōtôn, i.e. "of the Epirotes", see adjacent image).

In the Middle Ages, the term was used by the Despotate of Epirus, one of the Greek successor states of the Byzantine Empire following the dismemberment of the latter in 1204. By the Late Middle Ages, during the period of Humanism and the European Renaissance, the term was used as a synonym for Albania. During the Ottoman period the term was not used. Since the development of the modern Greek nationalism from the early 19th century onwards, the part of Lower Albania – the southern half of Ottoman Albania – that fell within the definition of ancient Epirus, has been called by the newly revived name by Greeks ever since. In Greece the name is used by the administrative region of Epirus. The Albanian name Epiri, which is derived from the ancient name, is used for the ancient region and not for an administrative one. Similarly, the Aromanian name Epiru is derived from the ancient one.

== Boundaries and definitions ==
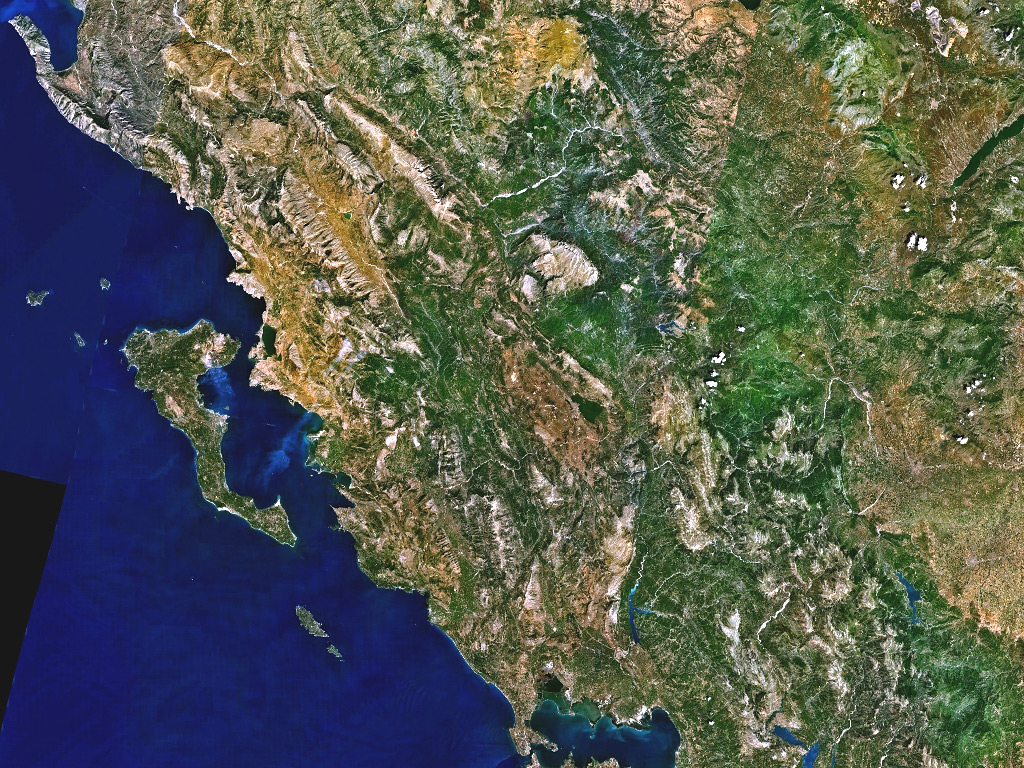
NASA satellite image of Epirus

Historically, the geographical area of Epirus proper is defined within the lines drawn from Cape Gjuhëz of the Ceraunian Mountains in the north-west, to Mount Qelqëz in the north-east, to Mount Gavrovo in the south-east, to the mouth of the Ambracian Gulf in the south-west. The northern boundary of ancient Epirus is alternatively given as the Vjosa river. Epirus's eastern boundary is defined by the Pindus Mountains, that form the spine of mainland Greece and separate Epirus from Macedonia and Thessaly. To the west, Epirus faces the Ionian Sea. The island of Corfu is situated off the Epirote coast but is not regarded as part of Epirus.

The definition of Epirus has changed over time, such that modern administrative boundaries do not correspond to the boundaries of ancient Epirus. The region of Epirus in Greece only comprises a fraction of classical Epirus and does not include its easternmost portions, which lie in Thessaly. In Albania, where the concept of Epirus is never used in an official context, classical Epirus comprises parts of the counties of Gjirokastër and Vlorë.

== History ==
=== Early history ===
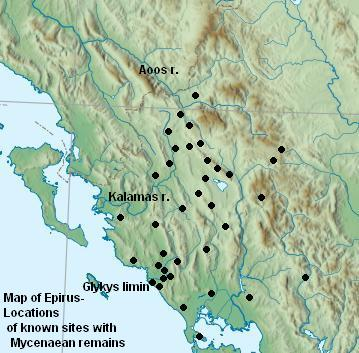
Mycenaean sites in the region of Epirus

In the Neolithic period Epirus was populated by seafarers along the coast and by shepherds and hunters from the southwestern Balkans who brought with them the Greek language. These people buried their leaders in large mounds containing shaft graves. Similar burial chambers were subsequently used by the Mycenaean civilization, suggesting that the founders of Mycenae may have come from Epirus and central Albania. Epirus itself remained culturally backward during this time, but Mycenaean remains have been found at two religious shrines of great antiquity in the region: the Oracle of the Dead on the Acheron River, familiar to the heroes of Homer's Odyssey, and the Oracle of Zeus at Dodona, to whom Achilles prayed in the Iliad.

In the Middle Bronze Age, Epirus was inhabited by the same nomadic Hellenic tribes that went on to settle in the rest of Greece. Aristotle considered the region around Dodona to have been part of Hellas and the region where the Hellenes originated.

According to Bulgarian linguist Vladimir I. Georgiev, Epirus was part of the Proto-Greek linguistic area during the Late Neolithic period. By the early 1st millennium BC, all fourteen Epirote tribes including the Chaonians in northwestern Epirus, the Molossians in the centre and the Thesprotians in the south, were speakers of a strong west Greek dialect.

=== Epirus in the Classical and Hellenistic periods ===
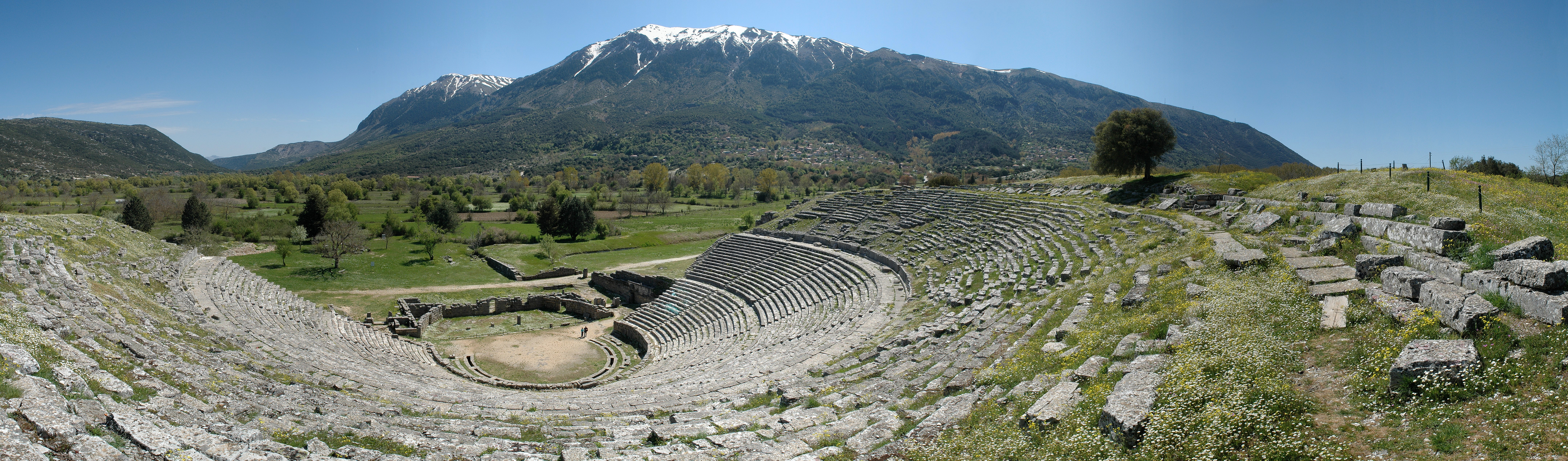
The theater of Dodona with Mt. Tomarus in the background

Regions of mainland Greece and environments in antiquity

Geographically on the edge of the Greek world, Epirus remained for the most part outside the limelight of Greek history until relatively late, much like the neighbouring Greek regions of Macedonia, Aetolia, and Acarnania, with which Epirus had political, cultural, linguistic and economic connections. Unlike most other Greeks of this time, who lived in or around city-states, the inhabitants of Epirus lived in small villages and their way of life was foreign to that of the poleis of southern Greece. Their region lay on the periphery of the Greek world and was far from peaceful; for many centuries, it remained a frontier area contested with the Illyrian peoples to the north. However, Epirus had a far greater religious significance than might have been expected given its geographical remoteness, due to the presence of the shrine and oracle at Dodona – regarded as second only to the more famous oracle at Delphi.

The Epirotes, speakers of a Northwest Greek dialect, different from the Doric of the Greek colonies on the Ionian islands, and bearers of mostly Greek names, as evidenced by epigraphy, seem to have been regarded with some disdain by some classical writers. The 5th-century BC Athenian historian Thucydides describes them as "barbarians" in his History of the Peloponnesian War, as does Strabo in his Geography, although the latter clearly distinguishes them from the neighboring Illyrians. Other writers, such as Herodotus, Dionysius of Halicarnassus, Pausanias, and Eutropius, describe them as Greeks. Similarly, Epirote tribes/states are included in the Argive and Epidaurian lists of the Greek Thearodokoi (hosts of sacred envoys). Plutarch mentions an interesting element of Epirote folklore regarding Achilles: In his biography of King Pyrrhus, he claims that Achilles "had a divine status in Epirus and in the local dialect he was called Aspetos" (meaning unspeakable, unspeakably great, in Homeric Greek).

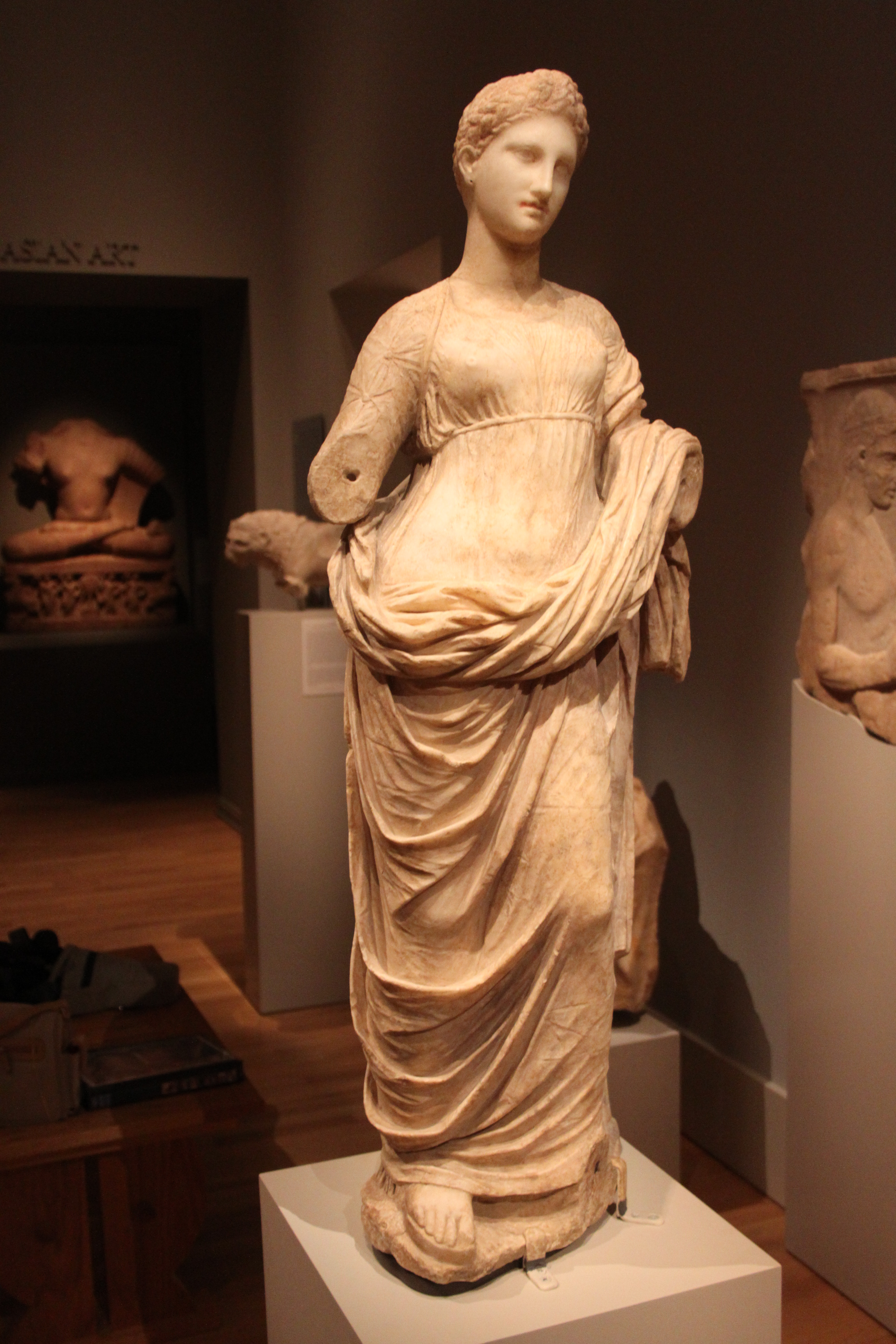
Terpsichore of Dodona, 2nd-century BC Hellenistic statue from Epirus

Beginning in 370 BC, the Molossian Aeacidae dynasty built a centralized state in Epirus and began expanding their power at the expense of rival tribes. The Aeacids allied themselves with the increasingly powerful kingdom of Macedon, in part against the common threat of Illyrian raids, and in 359 BC the Molossian princess Olympias, niece of Arybbas of Epirus, married King Philip II of Macedon. She was to become the mother of Alexander the Great.

On the death of Arybbas, Alexander of Epirus succeeded to the throne and the title King of Epirus in 334 BC. He invaded Italy, but was killed in battle by a Lucanian in the Battle of Pandosia against several Italic tribes 331 BC. Aeacides of Epirus, who succeeded Alexander, espoused the cause of Olympias against Cassander, but was dethroned in 313 BC. The struggle between Macedonia and Epirus involved the Illyrian Taulantii, when the Illyrian king Glaukias offered asylum to Aeacides' son, Pyrrhus, after his father was expelled from his kingdom among the Molossians. In 306 BC Glaukias invaded Epirus and established Pyrrhus on the Epirote throne, where he ruled with Illyrian help until he attended the wedding of one of his adoptive brothers (son of Glaukias) in 302 BC. In Pyrrhus' absence Molossians replaced him with Neoptolemus, another member of the Aeacides. Pyrrhus managed to murder Neoptolemus and eventually regained the throne. As king of Epirus, Pyrrhus strengthened his links with the Illyrian tribes by marriage alliances. For six years Pyrrhus fought against the Romans and Carthaginians in southern Italy and Sicily. The high cost of his victories against the Romans gave Epirus a new, but brief, importance, as well as a lasting contribution to the Greek language with the concept of a "Pyrrhic victory". Pyrrhus nonetheless brought great prosperity to Epirus, building the great theater of Dodona and a new suburb at Ambracia (now modern Arta), which he made his capital.

The Aeacid dynasty ended in 232 BC, but Epirus remained a substantial power, unified under the auspices of the Epirote League as a federal state with its own parliament, or synedrion. However, it was faced with the growing threat of the expansionist Roman Republic, which fought a series of wars against Macedon. The League steered an uneasy neutral course in the first two Macedonian Wars but split in the Third Macedonian War (171–168 BC), with the Molossians siding with the Macedonians and the Chaonians and Thesprotians siding with Rome. The outcome was disastrous for Epirus; Molossia fell to Rome in 167 BC and 150,000 of its inhabitants were enslaved and deported; the central part of Epirus never regained its former prosperity.

=== Roman and Byzantine rule ===
==== Epirus as a Roman province ====
Following his victory over Cleopatra and Mark Antony at Actium, Emperor Augustus commemorated the triumph by founding a Roman colony at Nicopolis ('City of Victory') in 29 BC. The region of Epirus was placed under the senatorial province of Achaea in 27 BC, with the exception of its northernmost part, which remained part of the province of Macedonia. Under Emperor Trajan, sometime between 103 and 114 AD, Epirus became a separate province, under a procurator Augusti. The new province extended from the Gulf of Aulon (Vlorë) and the Acroceraunian Mountains in the north to the lower course of the Acheloos River in the south, and included the northern Ionian Islands of Corfu, Lefkada, Ithaca, Cephallonia, and Zakynthos.

==== Late Antiquity ====
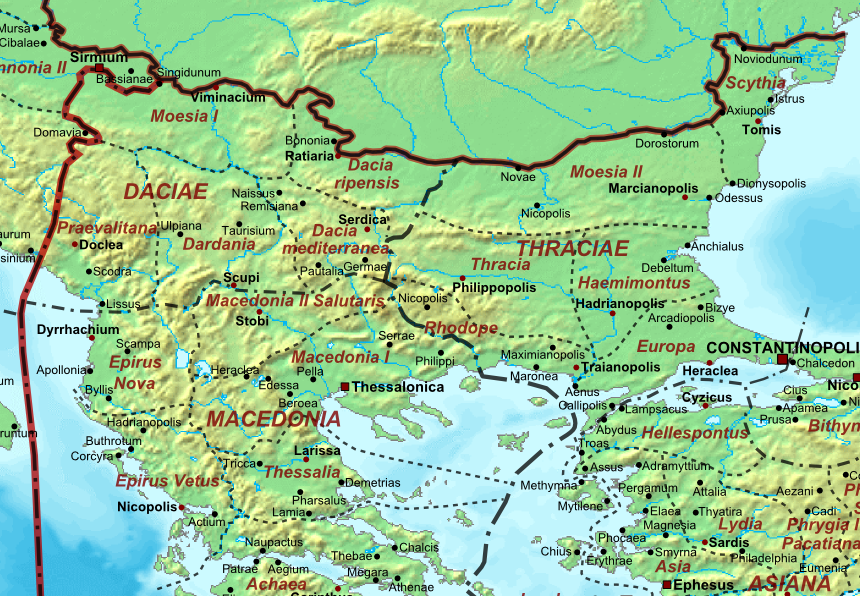
The Roman provinces in the Balkans, including Epirus Vetus and Epirus Nova, ca. 400 AD

Sometime during the provincial reorganization by Diocletian (r. 284–305), the western portion of the province of Macedonia along the Adriatic coast was split off into a new province, called "New Epirus" (Latin: Epirus Nova) which roughly corresponded to southern Illyria proper, historically inhabited by Illyrian tribes. Epirus proper thereafter became known as "Old Epirus" (Latin: Epirus Vetus, Ancient Greek: Παλαιὰ Ἤπειρος).

The two Epirote provinces became part of the Diocese of Moesia, until it was divided in ca. 369 into the dioceses of Macedonia and Dacia, when they became part of the former. In the 4th century, Epirus was still a stronghold of paganism, and was aided by Emperor Julian (r. 361–363) and his praetorian prefect Claudius Mamertinus through reduction in taxes and the rebuilding of the provincial capital, Nicopolis. According to Jordanes, in 380 the Visigoths raided the area. With the division of the Empire on the death of Theodosius I in 395, Epirus became part of the Eastern Roman or Byzantine Empire. In 395–397, the Visigoths under Alaric plundered Greece. They remained in Epirus for a few years, until 401, and again in 406–407, during Alaric's alliance with the Western Roman generalissimo Stilicho in order to wrest the Eastern Illyricum from the Eastern Empire.

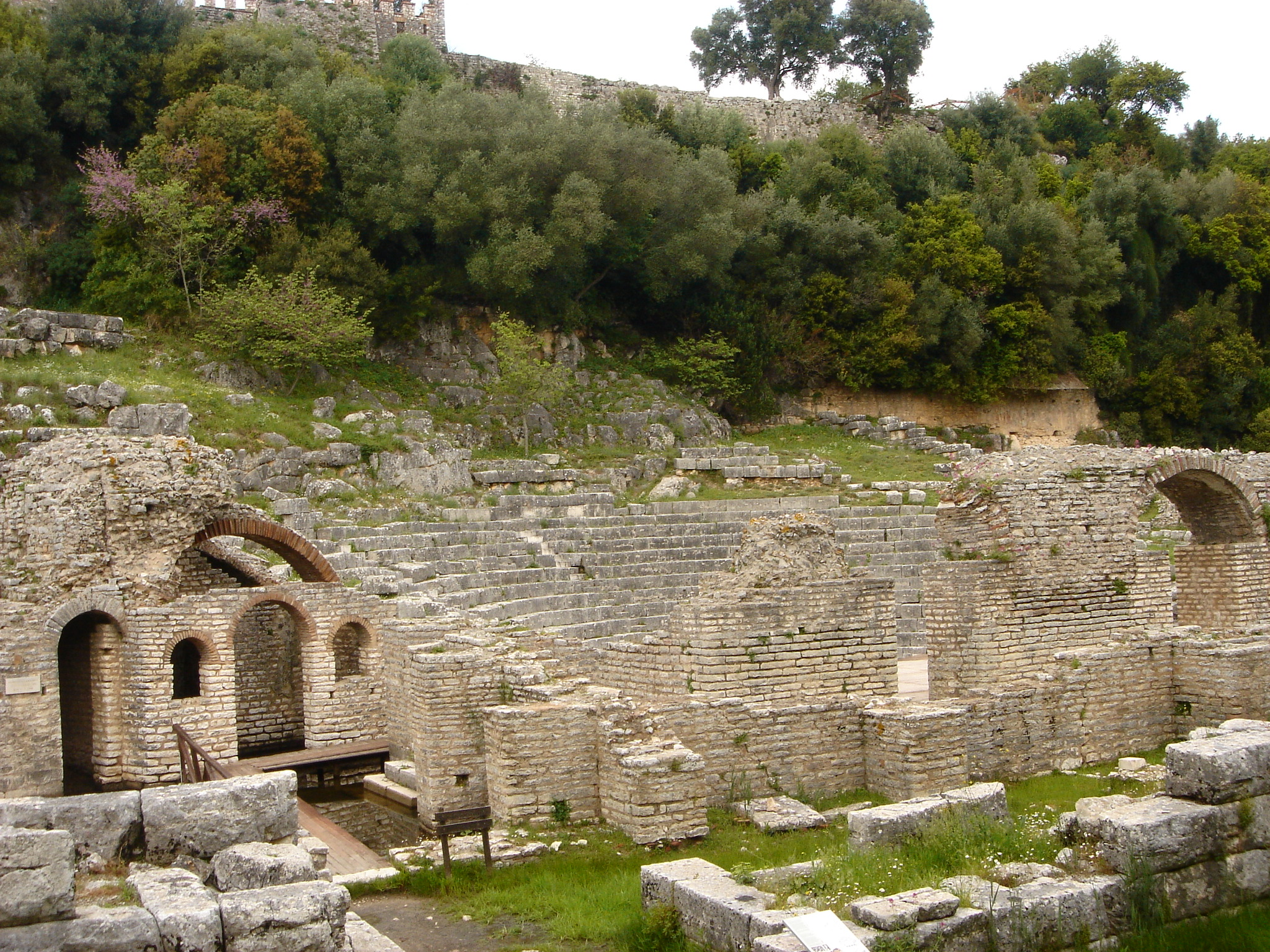
Ruins of Buthrotum

The Synecdemus of Hierocles, composed in ca. 527/8 AD but probably reflecting the situation in the first half of the 5th century, reports 11 cities for Old Epirus (Ancient Greek: Παλαιὰ Ἤπειρος, Latin: Epirus Vetus): the capital Nicopolis, Dodona, Euroea, Hadrianopolis, Appon, Phoenice, Anchiasmos, Buthrotum, Photike, Corfu Island, and Ithaca Island. New Epirus, with capital at Dyrrhachium, comprised 9 cities. From 467 on, the Ionian Islands and the coasts of Epirus became subject to raids by the Vandals, who had taken over the North African provinces and established their own kingdom centred on Carthage. The Vandals notably seized Nicopolis in 474 as a bargaining chip in their negotiations with Emperor Zeno, and plundered Zakynthos, killing many of its inhabitants and ferrying off others into slavery. Epirus Nova became a battleground in the rebellions of the Ostrogoths after 479. In 517, a raid of the Getae or Antae reached Greece, including Epirus Vetus. The claim of Procopius of Caesarea in his Secret History, that under Justinian I (r. 527–565) the entirety of the Balkan provinces was raided by barbarians every year, is considered rhetorical hyperbole by modern scholars; only a single Slavic raid to the environs of Dyrrhachium, in 548/9, has been documented. Procopius further reports that in 551, in an attempt to interdict the Byzantines' lines of communication with Italy during the Gothic War, the Ostrogoth king Totila sent his fleet to raid the shores of Epirus. In response to these raids, and to repair the damage done by two destructive earthquakes in 522, Justinian initiated a wide-ranging programme of reconstruction and re-fortification: Hadrianopolis was rebuilt, albeit in reduced extent, and renamed Justinianopolis, while Euroea was moved further inland (traditionally identified with the founding of Ioannina), while Procopius claims that no less than 36 smaller fortresses in Epirus Vetus—most of them not identifiable today—were either rebuilt or built anew.

==== Epirus from the Slavic invasions until 1204 ====
In the late 6th century Epirus proper fell under the control of the Avars and their Slavic allies. This is placed by the Chronicle of Monemvasia in the year 587, and is further corroborated by evidence that several sees were abandoned by their bishops by 591. Thus in c. 590 the bishop, clergy and people of Euroea fled their city, carrying with them the relics of their patron saint, St. Donatus, to Cassiope in Corfu.

Of the various Slavic tribes, only the Baiounitai, first attested c. 615, are known by name, giving their name to their region of settlement: "Vagenetia". Based on the density of the Slavic toponyms in Epirus, the Slavs must have settled in the region, although the extent of this settlement is unclear. Slavic toponyms occur mainly in the mountainous areas of the interior and the coasts of the Gulf of Corinth, indicative of the fact that this was the avenue used by most of the Slavs who crossed the Gulf into the Peloponnese. With the exception of some few toponyms on Corfu, the Ionian Islands seem to not have been affected by Slavic settlement. The linguistic analysis of the toponyms reveals that they date mostly to the early wave of Slavic settlement at the turn of the 6th/7th centuries. Due to scarcity of textual evidence, it is unclear how much the area was affected by the second wave of Slavic migration, which began in the middle of the 8th century due to Bulgar pressure in the northern Balkans. Slavic toponyms are nearly lacking in the mountains of Labëria (on the Kurvelesh plateau), in the Ionian coast where today Lab Albanian villages neighbour with the Greek-speaking ones, therefore it can be assumed that the expansion of the Slavs had not reached this region. A number of Slavic toponyms in Epirus proper were acquired by Albanian in the earliest phase of contacts between the two languages (Early Middle Ages), reflecting some of the more archaic phonetic features of Slavic as well as early Albanian phonology.

As in eastern Greece, the restoration of Byzantine rule seems to have proceeded from the islands, chiefly Cephallonia, which was certainly under firm Imperial control in c. 702, when Philippicus Bardanes was banished there. The gradual restoration of Imperial rule is evidenced further from the participation of local bishops in councils in Constantinople: whereas only the bishop of Dyrrhachium participated in the Ecumenical Councils of 680/1 and 692, a century later the bishops of Dyrrhachium, Nicopolis, Corfu, Cephallonia, and Zakynthos are attested in the Second Council of Nicaea in 787. In about the middle of the 8th century, the Theme of Cephallenia was established, but at least initially it was more oriented towards restoring Byzantine control over the Ionian and Adriatic seas, combating Saracen piracy, and securing communications with the remaining Byzantine possessions in Italy, rather than any systematic effort at subduing the Epirote mainland. Nevertheless, following the onset of the Muslim conquest of Sicily in 827, the Ionian became particularly exposed to Arab raids.

Map of the southern Balkans and western Anatolia in ca. 900 AD, with the Byzantine themes and major settlements.

The 9th century saw great progress in the restoration of Imperial control in the mainland, as evidenced by the participation of the bishops of Ioannina, Naupaktos, Hadrianopolis, and Vagenetia (evidently by now organized as a Sklavinia under imperial rule) in the Ecumenical Councils of 869/70 and 879/80. The Byzantine recovery resulted in an influx of Greeks from southern Italy and Asia Minor into the Greek interior, while remaining Slavs were Christianized and Hellenized. The eventual success of the Hellenization campaign also suggests a continuity of the original Greek population, and that the Slavs had settled among many Greeks, in contrast to areas further north, in what is now Bulgaria and the former Yugoslavia, as those areas could not be Hellenized when they were recovered by the Byzantines in the early 11th century. Following the great naval victory of admiral Nasar in 880, and the beginning of the Byzantine offensive against the Arabs in southern Italy in the 880s, the security situation improved and the Theme of Nicopolis was established, most likely after 886. As the ancient capital of Epirus had been laid waste by the Slavs, the capital of the new theme became Naupaktos further south. The extent of the new province is unclear, but probably matched the extent of the Metropolis of Naupaktos, established at about the same time, encompassing the sees of Vonditsa, Aetos, Acheloos, Rogoi, Ioannina, Hadrianopolis, Photike, and Buthrotum. Vagenetia notably no longer appears as a bishopric. As the authors of the Tabula Imperii Byzantini comment, it appears that "the Byzantine administration had brought the strongly Slavic-settled areas in the mainland somewhat under its control, and a certain Re-Hellenization had set in". Further north, the region around Dyrrhachium existed as the homonymous theme possibly as early as the 9th century.

During the early 10th century, the themes of Cephallenia and Nicopolis appear mostly as bases for expeditions against southern Italy and Sicily, while Mardaites from both themes are listed in the large but unsuccessful expedition of 949 against the Emirate of Crete. In c. 930, the Theme of Nicopolis was raided by the Bulgarians, who even occupied some parts until driven out or subjugated by the Byzantines years later. Only the extreme north of Epirus seems to have remained consistently under Bulgarian rule in the period, but under Tsar Samuel, who moved the centre of Bulgarian power south and west to Ohrid, probably all of Epirus down to the Ambracian Gulf came under Bulgarian rule. This is evidenced from the fact that the territories that were under Bulgarian rule formed part of the autocephalous Archbishopric of Ohrid after the Byzantine conquest of Bulgaria by Emperor Basil II in 1018: thus in Epirus the sees of Chimara, Hadrianopolis, Bela, Buthrotum, Ioannina, Kozyle, and Rogoi passed under the jurisdiction of Ohrid, while the Metropolitan of Naupaktos retained only the sees of Bonditza, Aetos, and Acheloos. Basil II also established new, smaller themes in the region: Koloneia, and Dryinopolis (Hadrianopolis).

The region joined the uprising of Petar Delyan in 1040, and suffered in the First Norman invasion of the Balkans: Dyrrhachium was occupied by the Normans in 1081–1084, Arta was unsuccessfully besieged, and Ioannina was captured by Robert Guiscard. An Aromanian presence in Epirus is first mentioned in the late 11th century, while Jewish communities are attested throughout the medieval period in Arta and Ioannina.

==== Despotate of Epirus ====
Expansion of the Despotate of Epirus in the early 13th century

When Constantinople fell to the Fourth Crusade in 1204, the partitio Romaniae assigned Epirus to Venice, but the Venetians were largely unable to effectively establish their authority, except over Dyrrhachium (the "Duchy of Durazzo"). The Greek noble Michael Komnenos Doukas, who had married the daughter of a local magnate, took advantage of this, and within a few years consolidated his control over most of Epirus, first as a Venetian vassal and eventually as an independent ruler. By the time of his death in 1214/5, Michael had established a strong state, the Despotate of Epirus, with the former theme of Nicopolis at its core and Arta as its capital. Epirus, and the city of Ioannina in particular, became a haven for Greek refugees from the Latin Empire of Constantinople for the next half century.

The Despotate of Epirus ruled over Epirus and western Greece as far south as Naupaktos and the Gulf of Corinth, much of Albania (including Dyrrhachium), Thessaly, and the western portion of Macedonia, extending its rule briefly over central Macedonia and most of Thrace following the aggressive expansionism of Theodore Komnenos Doukas, who established the Empire of Thessalonica in 1224. During this time, the definition of Epirus came to encompass the entire coastal region from the Ambracian Gulf to Dyrrhachium, and the hinterland to the west up to the highest peaks of the Pindus mountain range. Some of the most important cities in Epirus, such as Gjirokastër (Argyrokastron), were founded during this period. The oldest reference to Albanians in the area of Epirus proper is from a Venetian document dating to 1210, which states that "the continent facing the island of Corfu is inhabited by Albanians".

==== 14th century and Ottoman conquest ====
In 1337, Epirus was once again brought under the rule of the restored Byzantine Empire. In 1348, taking advantage of the civil war between the Byzantine emperors John V Palaiologos and John VI Kantakouzenos, the Serbian king Stefan Uroš IV Dušan conquered Epirus, with a number of Albanian mercenaries assisting him. The Byzantine authorities in Constantinople soon re-established a measure of control by making the Despotate of Epirus a vassal state, but Albanian clans proceeded to invade and seize most of the region. Under Pjetër Losha, the Albanian Malakasi and Mazaraki tribes defeated Nikephoros II Orsini at the Battle of Achelous in 1359, which won Pjetër Losha the rule of Arta; Losha then founded the Despotate of Arta (1358–1416) with the help of the Mazaraki and Malakasi clans.

Map of the southern Balkans and western Anatolia in 1410

Although Albanian clans gained control of most of the region by 1366/7, their continued division into rival clans meant that they could not establish a single central authority. Ioannina became a center of Greek resistance to the Albanian clans. The Greeks of Ioannina offered power to three foreign rulers during this time, beginning with Thomas II Preljubović (1367–1384), whose rule was marked by hostilities in the region, as Ioannina came under constant siege by the Mazaraki and Malakasi clans under Losha. These tribes would besiege Ioannina a second time in 1374–1375. A truce was signed when Pjetër's son Gjin was betrothed to Thomas's daughter Irina, but she would soon die in the 1375 plague and hostilities would recommence. Preljubović attempted to pacify the Albanians of Epirus; however, under Gjin Bua Shpata, the Albanians defeated him.

The reign of Esau de' Buondelmonti (1385–1411) in Ioannina followed, and with an army that consisted of the Albanian tribes of the Mazaraki and Malakasi, he marched against the Principality of Gjirokastër. He was defeated and captured by Albanian nobleman Gjon Zenebishi, and ransomed for 10,000 gold pieces on the intervention of the Venetian governor of Corfu. At the time the Zenebishi clan controlled the area around Gjirokastër (1386–1411), while only the city of Ioannina remained under Greek control.

Carlo I Tocco (1411–1429) then assumed control of Ioannina, commencing heavy conflicts with Jakob and Muriq Shpata, the Albanian leaders of the Despotate of Arta. The Shpata were originally defeated by Carlo's brother Leonardo II Tocco at Mazoma near ancient Nicopolis, but Carlo's son Torno was in turn defeated by the Albanians. After the Tocchi succeeded in capturing Rhiniasa, Leonardo tried to take Rogoi and Carlo attempted to take Arta, but Jakob and Muriq succeeded in defending their capital for the time being. Carlo withdrew to Ioannina, but soon after was able to lure Jakob to an ambush near Vobliana: Jakob was captured and immediately executed (1 October 1416). Carlo had effectively ended the rule of the Albanian clans in southernmost Epirus.

Nevertheless, internal dissension eased the Ottoman conquest, which began with the capture of Ioannina in 1430 and continued with Arta in 1449, Angelokastro in 1460, Riniasa Castle and its environs (in what is now Preveza) in 1463, and finally Vonitsa in 1479. With the exception of several coastal Venetian possessions, this was also the end of Latin rule in mainland Greece.

=== Ottoman rule ===
The Ottomans ruled Epirus for almost 500 years. Their rule in Epirus proved particularly damaging; the region was subjected to deforestation and excessive cultivation, which damaged the soil and drove many Epirotes to emigrate so as to escape the region's pervasive poverty. Nonetheless, the Ottomans did not enjoy total control of Epirus. The Himara and Zagori regions managed to successfully resist Ottoman rule and maintained a degree of independence throughout this period. The Ottomans expelled the Venetians from almost the whole area in the late 15th century.

Between the 16th and 19th centuries, the city of Ioannina attained great prosperity and became a major center of the modern Greek Enlightenment. Numerous schools were founded, such as the Balaneios, Maroutsaia, Kaplaneios, and Zosimaia, teaching subjects such as literature, philosophy, mathematics and physical sciences. In the 18th century, as the power of the Ottoman Empire declined, the area of Epirus became part of a de facto independent state, the Pashalik of Yanina, under the rule of Ali Pasha of Tepelena, a Muslim Albanian brigand who rose to become the provincial governor of Ioannina in 1788. At the height of his power, he and his sons controlled all southern and central Albania; most of mainland Greece, including Epirus, Thessaly, West Macedonia, western Central Macedonia, Continental Greece (excluding Attica), and the Peloponnese; and parts of southwestern North Macedonia around Ohrid and Manastir. Ali Pasha's campaign to subjugate the confederation of the settlements of Souli met with fierce resistance by the Souliot warriors of the mountainous area. After numerous failed attempts to defeat the Souliotes, his troops succeeded in conquering the area in 1803. On the other hand, Ali, who used Greek as official language, witnessed an increase of Greek cultural activity with the establishment of several educational institutions.

When the Greek War of Independence broke out, the inhabitants of Epirus contributed greatly. Two of the founding members of the Filiki Eteria (the secret society of the Greek revolutionaries), Nikolaos Skoufas and Athanasios Tsakalov, came from the Arta area and the city of Ioannina, respectively. Greece's first constitutional prime minister (1844–1847), Ioannis Kolettis, was a native of the village of Syrrako in Epirus and was a former personal physician to Ali Pasha. Ali Pasha tried to use the war as an opportunity to make himself a fully independent ruler, but was assassinated by Ottoman agents in 1822. When Greece became independent in 1830, however, Epirus remained under Ottoman rule. In 1854, during the Crimean War, a major local rebellion broke out. Although the newly found Greek state tried tacitly to support it, the rebellion was suppressed by Ottoman forces after a few months. Another failed rebellion by local Greeks broke out in 1878. During this period, the Ecumenical Patriarchate of Constantinople managed to shut down the few Albanian schools, considering teaching in Albanian a factor that would diminish its influence and lead to the creation of separate Albanian church, while publications in Albanian were banned by the Ottoman Empire. In the late 19th century, the Kingdom of Italy opened various schools in the regions of Ioannina and Preveza in order to influence the local population. These schools began to attract students from the Greek language schools, but were ultimately closed after intervention and harassment by the Ecumenical Patriarchate of Constantinople. Throughout, the late period of Ottoman rule (from the 18th century) Greek and Aromanian population of the region suffered from Albanians raiders, that sporadically continued after Ali Pasha's death, until 1912–1913.

=== 20th-century Epirus ===
While the Treaty of Berlin (1878) awarded large parts of Epirus to Greece, opposition by the Ottomans and the League of Prizren resulted in only the region of Arta being ceded to Greece in 1881. It was only following the First Balkan War of 1912–1913 and the Treaty of London that the rest of southern Epirus, including Ioannina, was incorporated into Greece. Greece had also seized northern Epirus during the Balkan Wars, but the Treaty of Bucharest, which concluded the Second Balkan War, assigned Northern Epirus to Albania.

This outcome was unpopular among local Greeks, as a substantial Greek population existed on the Albanian side of the border. Among Greeks, northern Epirus was henceforth regarded as terra irredenta. Local Greeks in northern Epirus revolted, declared their independence and proclaimed the Autonomous Republic of Northern Epirus in February 1914. After fierce guerrilla fighting, they managed to gain full autonomy under the terms of the Protocol of Corfu, signed by Albanian and Northern Epirote representatives and approved by the Great Powers. The signing of the Protocol ensured that the region would have its own administration, recognized the rights of the local Greeks and provided self-government under nominal Albanian sovereignty. The Republic, however, was short-lived, as when World War I broke out, Albania collapsed, and northern Epirus was alternately controlled by Greece, Italy and France at various intervals.

Although the Paris Peace Conference of 1919 awarded Northern Epirus to Greece, developments such as the Greek defeat in the Greco-Turkish War and, crucially, Italian lobbying in favor of Albania meant that Greece would not keep Northern Epirus. In 1924, the area was again ceded to Albania.

In 1939, Italy occupied Albania, and in 1940 invaded Greece. The Italians were driven back into Albania, however, and Greek forces again took control of northern Epirus. The conflict marked the first tactical victory of the Allies in World War II. Benito Mussolini himself supervised the spring counter-offensive of his divisions in spring 1941, only to be repulsed again by the poorly equipped, but determined, Greeks. Nazi Germany then intervened in April 1941 to avert an Italian defeat. The German military performed rapid military maneuvers through Yugoslavia and forced the encircled Greek forces of the Epirus front to surrender.

The whole of Epirus was then placed under Italian occupation until 1943, when the Germans took over following the Italian surrender to the Allies. Due to the extensive activity of the anti-Nazi Greek resistance (mainly under EDES), the Germans carried out large scaled anti-partisan sweeps, making wide use of Nazi-collaborationist bands of Cham Albanians, who committed numerous atrocities against the civilian population. They fought fiercely against the Greek partisans of the EDES, the latter being ordered by the Allied command to push them out of Greece into Albania. The violent clashes and the reprisals that followed by the Greek guerillas resulted in the expulsion to Albania of almost the entire Cham population.

With the liberation of Greece and the start of the first round of the Greek Civil War at the end of 1944, the highlands of Epirus became a major theater of guerrilla warfare between the leftist Greek People's Liberation Army (ELAS) and the right-wing National Republican Greek League (EDES). In subsequent years (1945–1949), the mountains of Epirus also became the scene of some of the fiercest fighting of the second and bloodier round of the Greek Civil War. The final episode of the war took place on Mount Grammos in 1949, ending with the defeat of the Communists. Peace returned to the region in 1949, although because of official Albanian active involvement in the civil war on the side of the communists, the formal state of war between Greece and Albania remained in effect until 1987. Another reason for the continuation of the state of war until 1987 was that during the entire period of Communist rule in Albania, the Greek population of Northern Epirus experienced forced Albanisation. Although a Greek minority was recognized by the Hoxha regime, this recognition only applied to an "official minority zone" consisting of 99 villages, leaving out important areas of Greek settlement, such as Himara. People outside the official minority zone received no education in the Greek language, which was prohibited in public. The Hoxha regime also diluted the ethnic demographics of the region by relocating Greeks living there and settling in their stead Albanians from other parts of the country. Relations began to improve in the 1980s with Greece's abandonment of any territorial claims over Northern Epirus and the lifting of the official state of war between the two countries.

== Geography and ecology ==
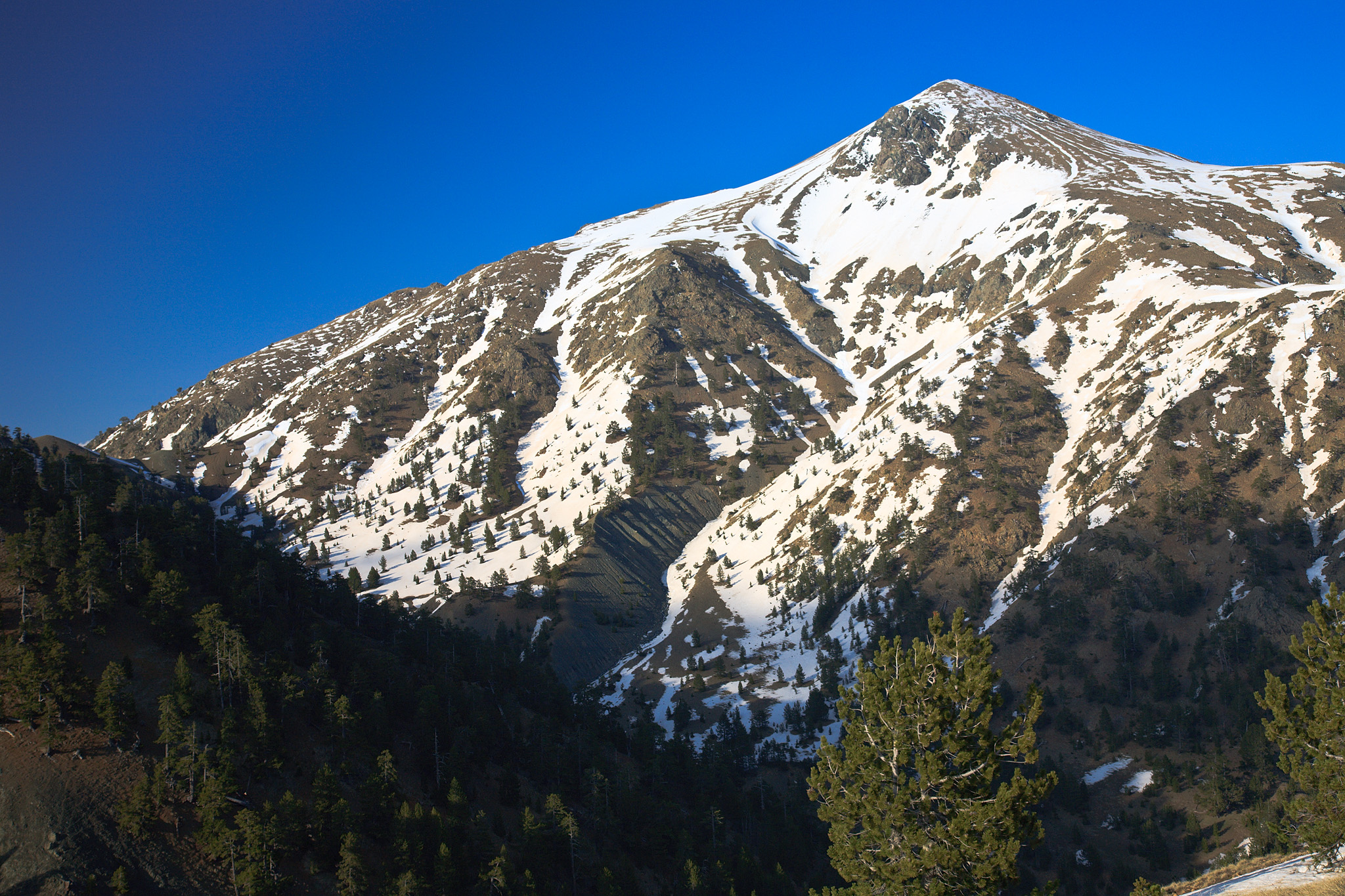
Mount Smolikas (2637m/8652f), the highest point in Epirus

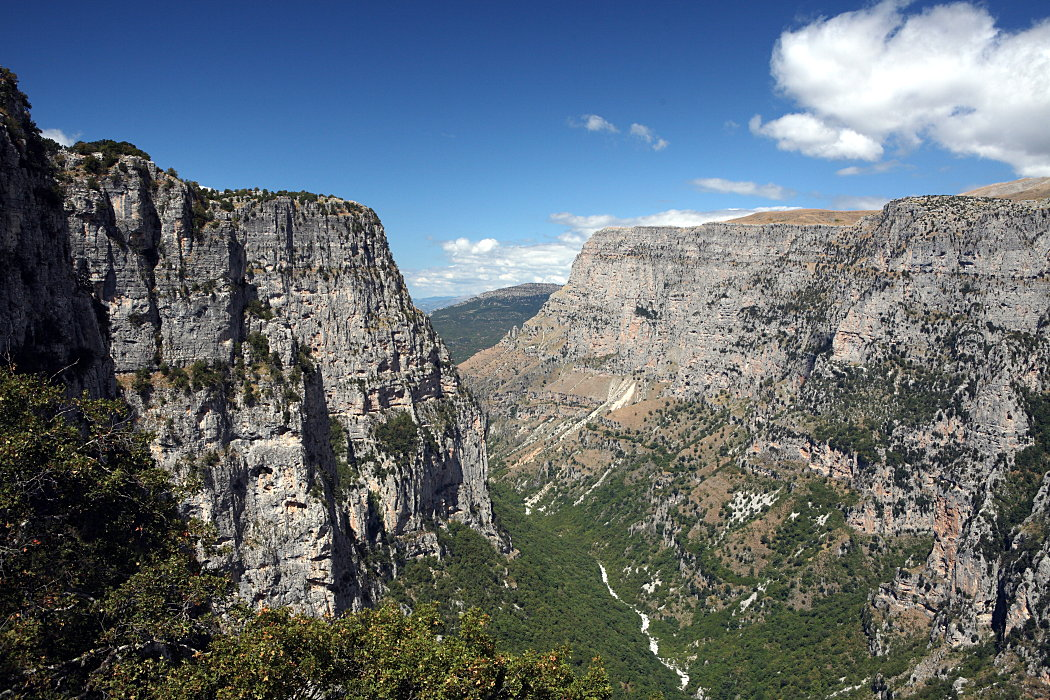
Vikos Gorge in Vikos–Aoös National Park

Epirus is a predominantly rugged and mountainous region. It is largely made up of the Pindus Mountains, a series of parallel limestone ridges that are a continuation of the Dinaric Alps. The Pindus mountains form the spine of mainland Greece and separate Epirus from Macedonia and Thessaly to the east. The ridges of the Pindus are parallel to the sea and generally so steep that the valleys between them are mostly suitable for pasture rather than large-scale agriculture. Altitude increases as one moves east, away from the coast, reaching a maximum of 2,637 m at Mount Smolikas, the highest point in Epirus. Other important ranges include Tymfi (2,496 m at Mount Gamila), Lygkos (2,249 m), to the west and east of Smolikas respectively, Gramos (2,523 m) in the northeast, Tzoumerka (2,356 m) in the southeast, Tomaros (1,976 m) in the southwest, Mitsikeli near Ioannina (1,810 m), Mourgana (1,806 m), and Nemercke/Aeoropos (2,485 m) on the border between Greece and Albania, and the Ceraunian Mountains (2,000 m) near Himara in Albania. Most of Epirus lies on the windward side of the Pindus, and the prevailing winds from the Ionian Sea make the region the rainiest in mainland Greece.

Significant lowlands are to be found only near the coast, in the southwest near Arta and Preveza, in the Acheron plain between Paramythia and Fanari, between Igoumenitsa and Sagiada, and also near Saranda. The Zagori area is a scenic upland plateau surrounded by mountain on all sides.

The main river flowing through Epirus is the Vjosë, which flows in a northwesterly direction from the Pindus mountains in Greece to its mouth north of the Bay of Vlorë in Albania. Other important rivers include the Acheron river, famous for its religious significance in ancient Greece and site of the Necromanteion, the Arachthos river, crossed by the historic Bridge of Arta, the Louros, the Thyamis or Kalamas, and the Voidomatis, a tributary of the Vjosë flowing through the Vikos Gorge. The Vikos Gorge, one of the deepest in the world, forms the centerpiece of the Vikos–Aoös National Park, known for its scenic beauty. The only significant lake in Epirus is Lake Pamvotis, on whose shores lies the city of Ioannina, the region's largest and traditionally most important city.

The climate of Epirus is Mediterranean along the coast and Alpine in the interior. Epirus is heavily forested, mainly by coniferous species. The fauna in Epirus is especially rich and features species such as bears, wolves, foxes, deer, and lynxes.

== Economy ==
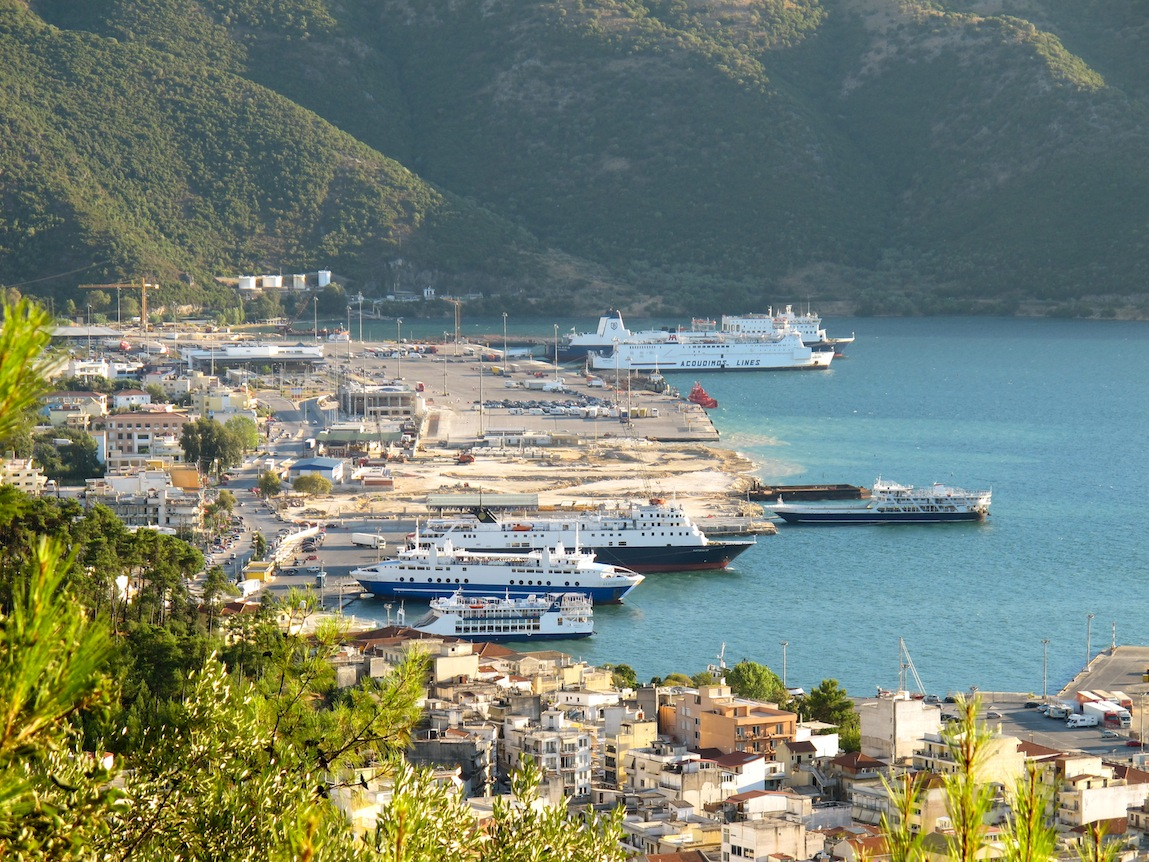
Igoumenitsa is the main port in Epirus, and links the region to Italy.

A rugged topography, poor soils, and fragmented landholdings have kept agricultural production low and have resulted in a low population density. Animal husbandry is the main industry and corn the chief crop. Oranges and olives are grown in the western lowlands, while tobacco is grown around Ioannina. Epirus has few natural resources and industries, and the population has been depleted by migration. The population is centered around Ioannina, which has the largest number of industrial establishments.

== Transportation ==
Epirus has historically been a remote and isolated region due to its location between the Pindus mountains and the sea. In antiquity, the Roman Via Egnatia passed through Epirus Nova, which linked Byzantium and Thessalonica to Dyrrachium on the Adriatic Sea. The modern Egnatia Odos, the A2 motorway, which links Ioannina to the Greek province of Macedonia and terminating at Igoumenitsa, is the only highway through the Pindus mountains and has served to greatly reduce the region's isolation from the east, while the Ionia Odos highway, connecting Epirus with Western Greece, helped reducing the region's isolation from the south. Also, the Aktio-Preveza Undersea Tunnel connects the southernmost tip of Epirus, near Preveza, with Aetolia-Acarnania in western Greece. Ferry services from Igoumenitsa to the Ionian islands and Italy exist. The only airport in Epirus is the Ioannina National Airport, while the Aktion National Airport is located just south of Preveza in Aetolia-Acarnania. There are no railroads in Epirus.

== Gallery ==
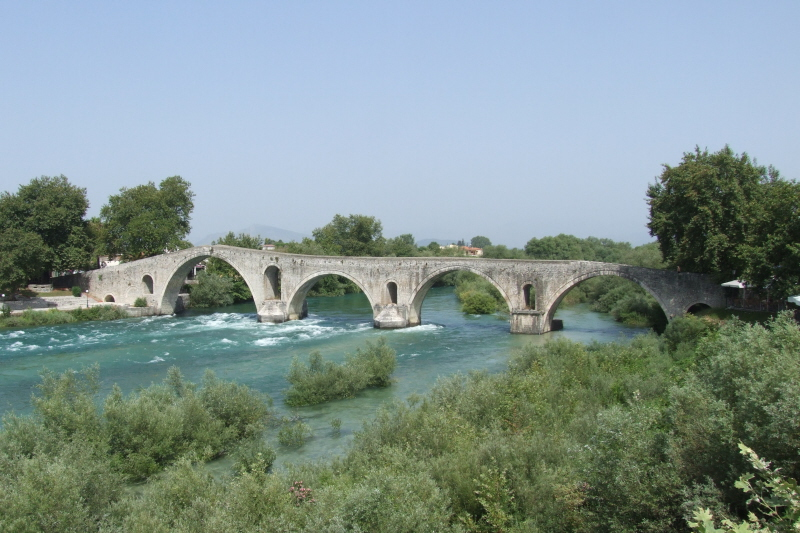
The Bridge of Arta

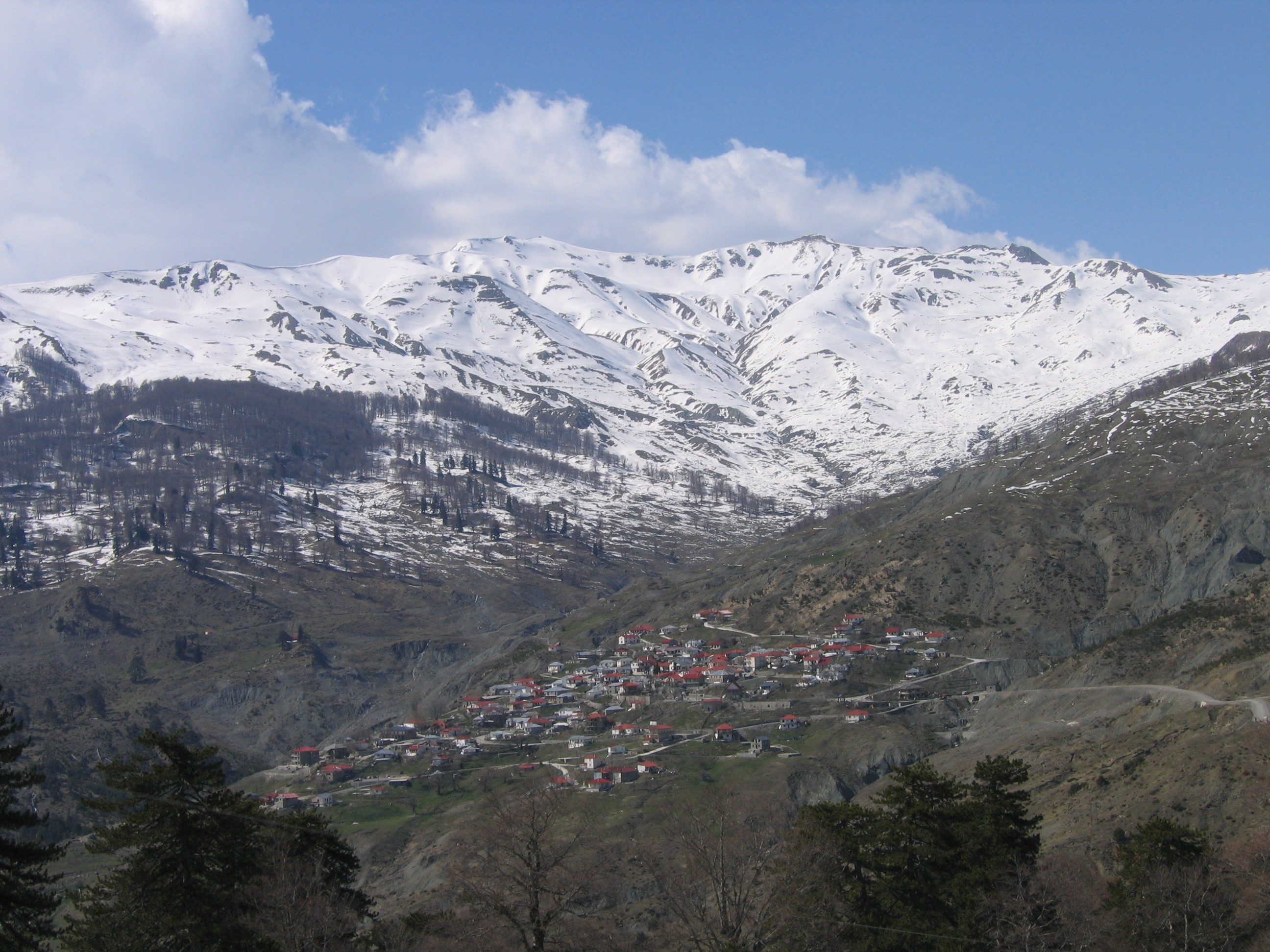
The village of Aetomilitsa on Mount Gramos, in the Pindus mountains

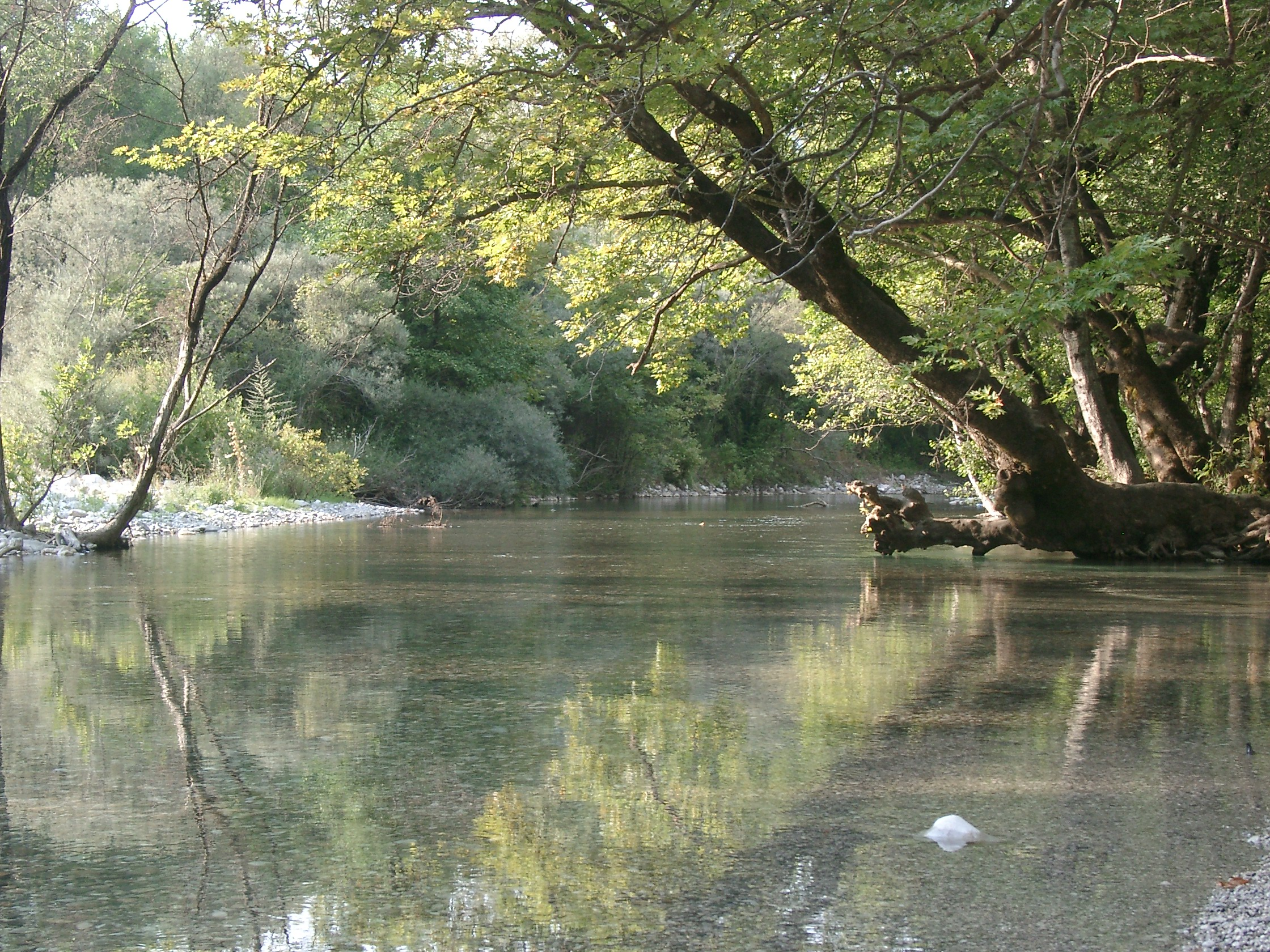
The Vikos river, Vikos–Aoös National Park

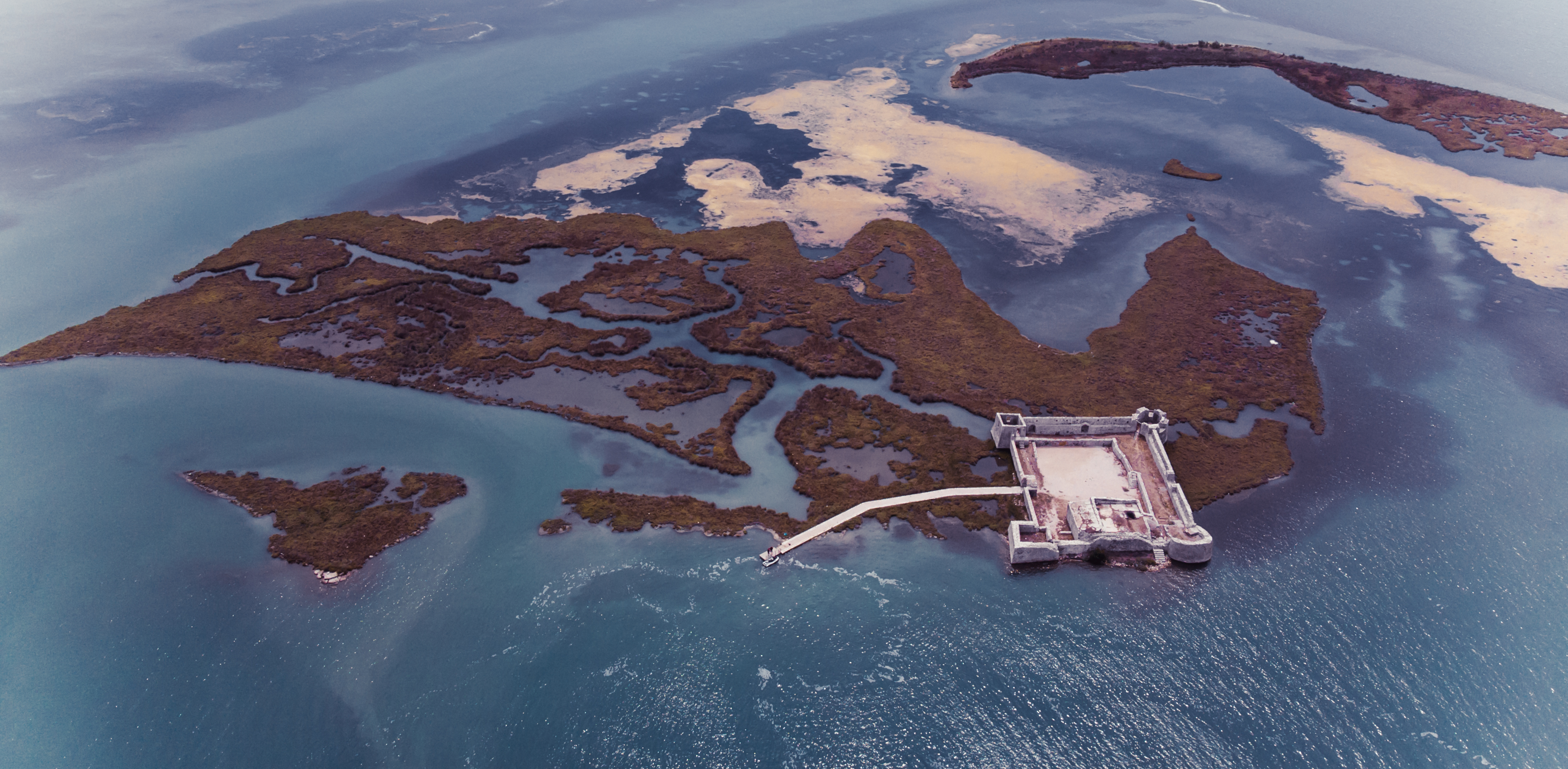
Aerial view of the castle of Ali Pasha of Yanina, Sarandë municipality

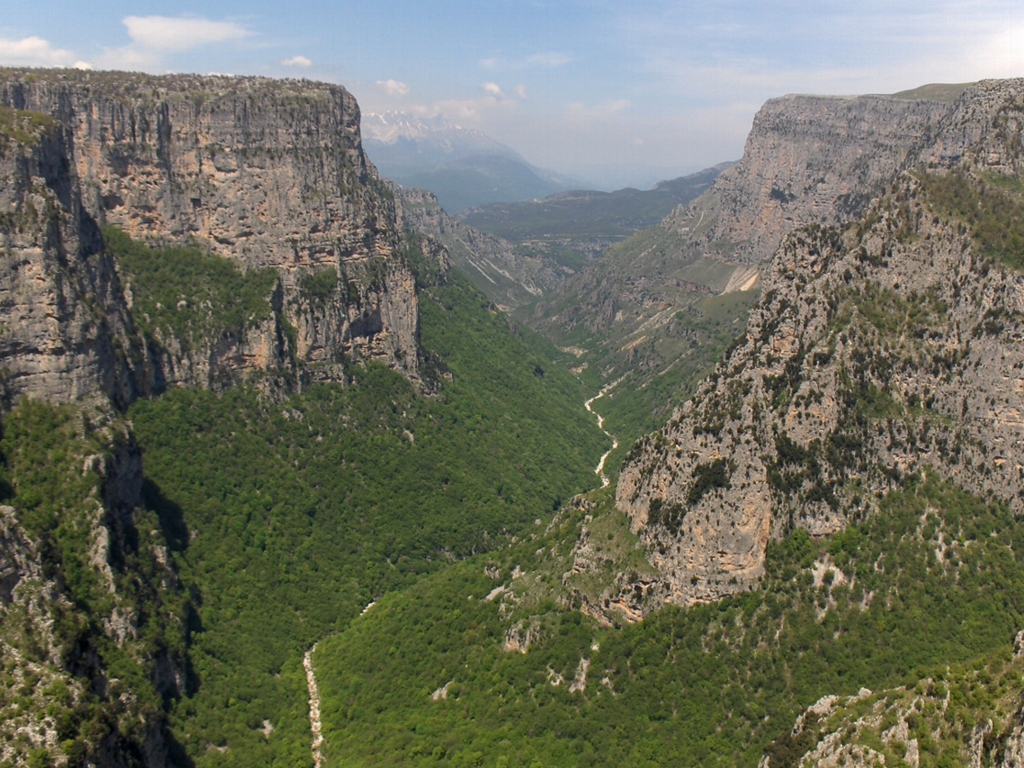
The Vikos Gorge

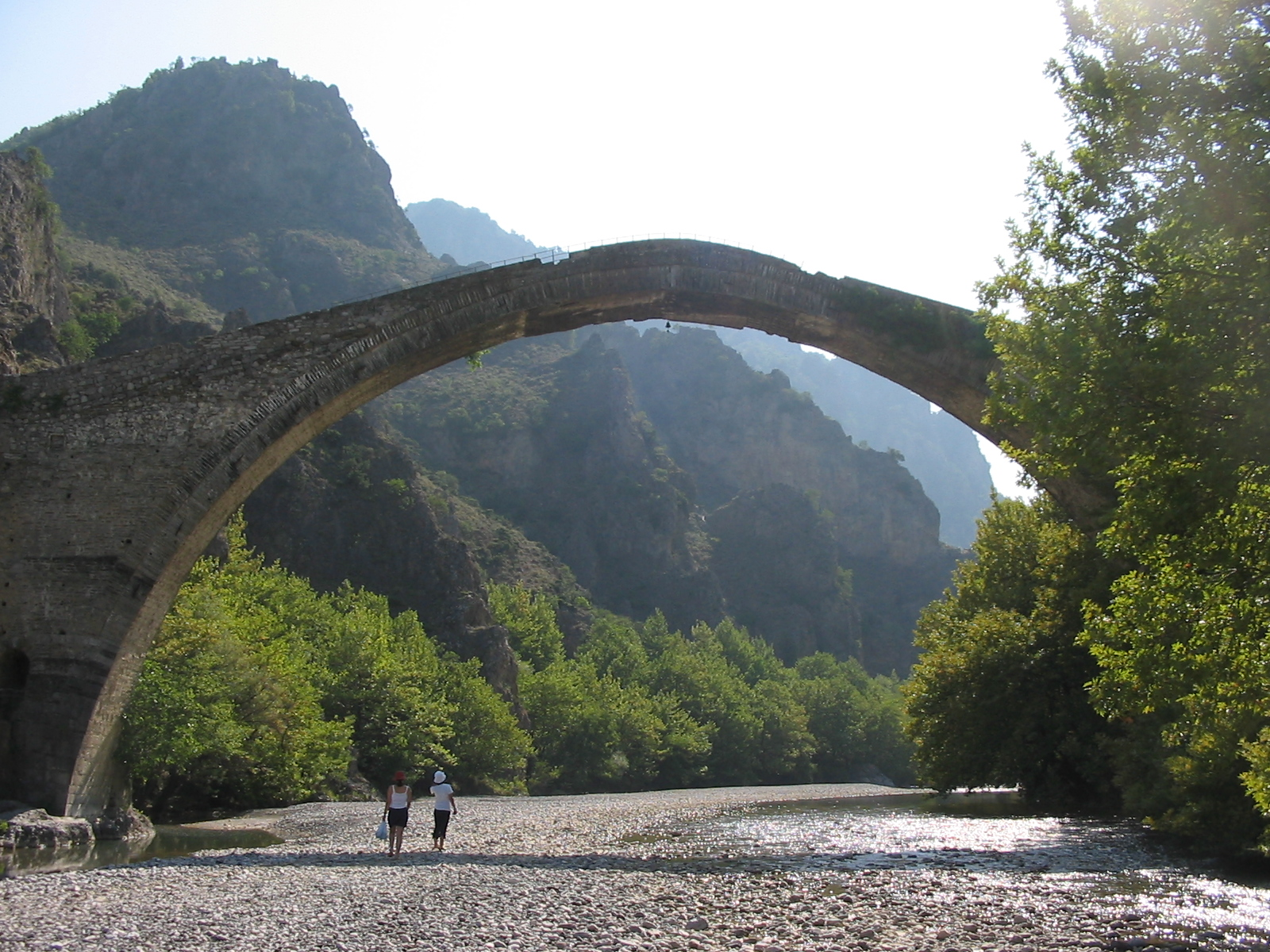
The old bridge of Konitsa over the Aoos river

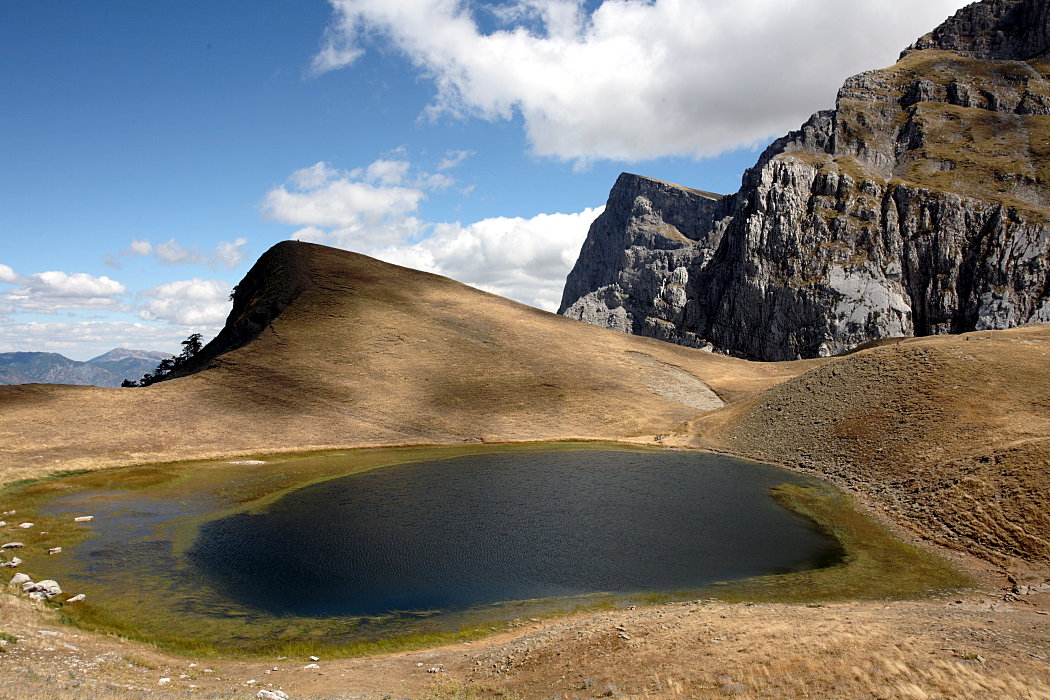
The high altitude Lake Drakolimni (Dragon Lake), on Mount Gamila in the Pindus mountains

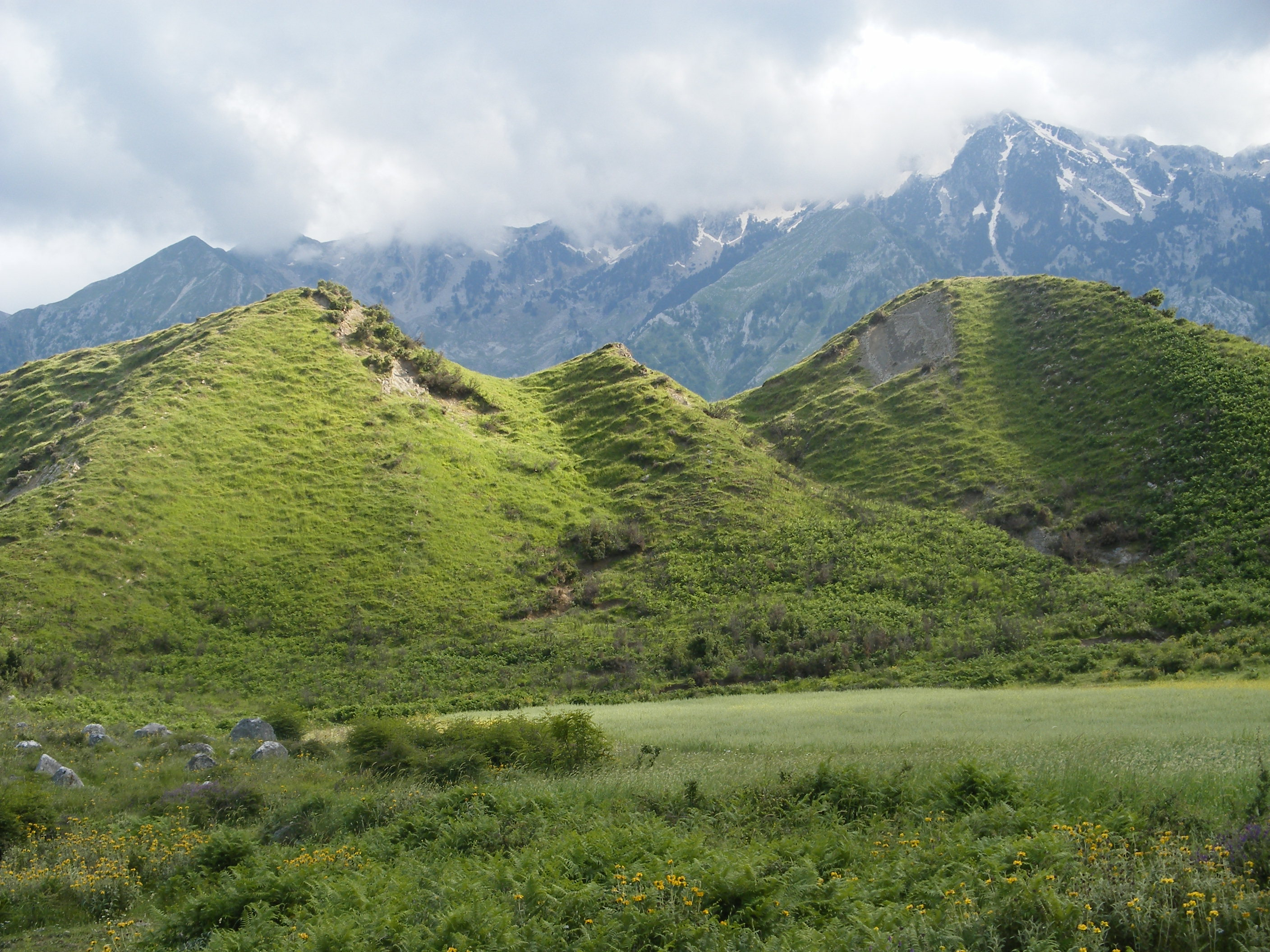
Hill formations in Horë-Vranisht.

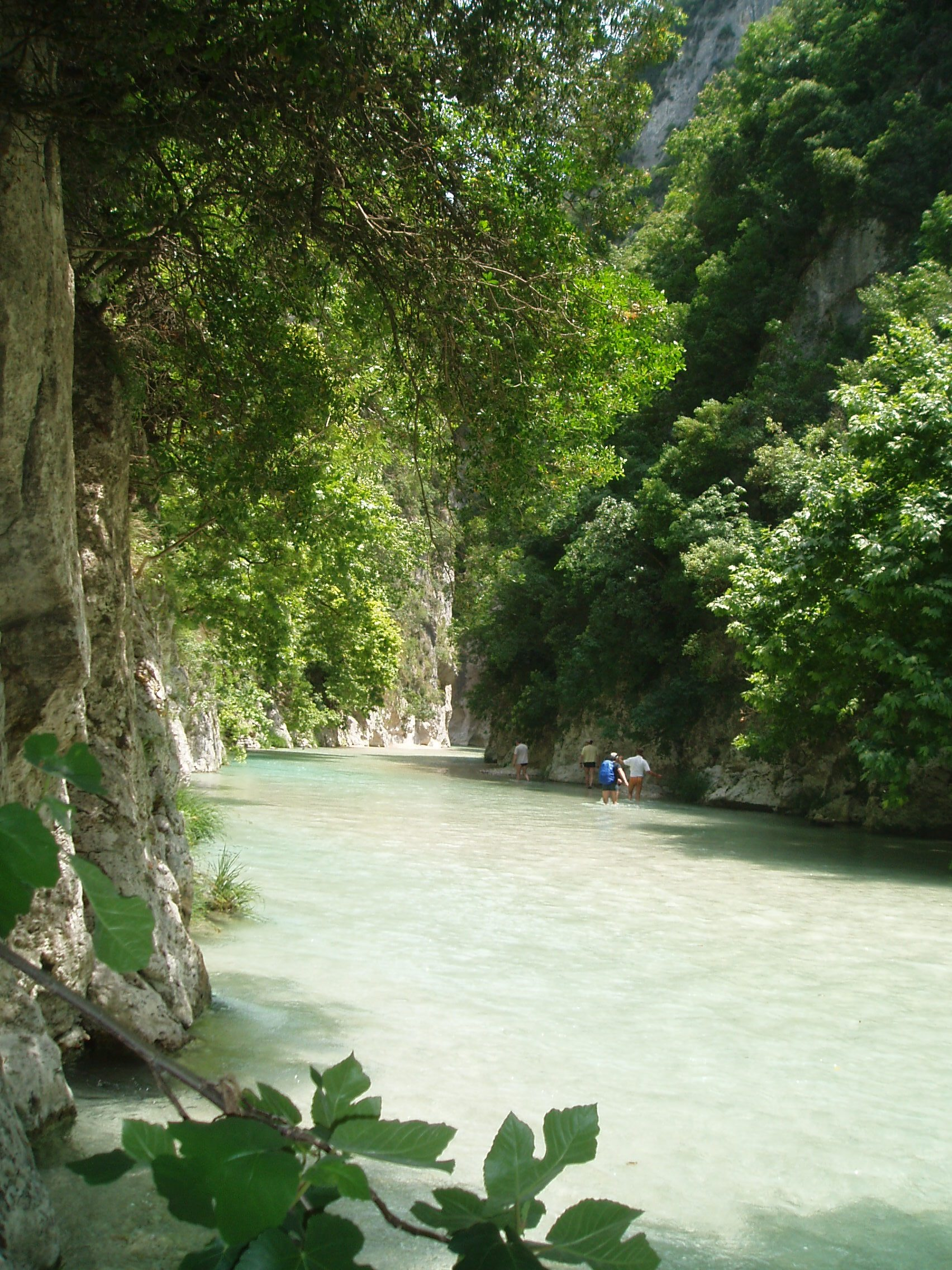
A canyon of the Acheron river

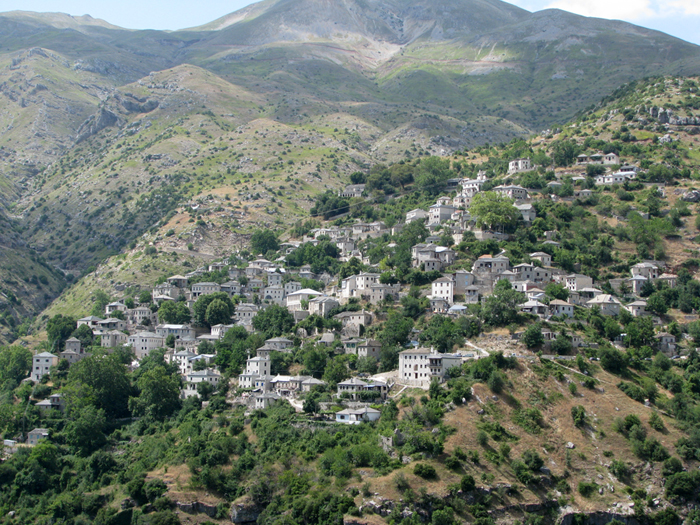
The village of Sirako

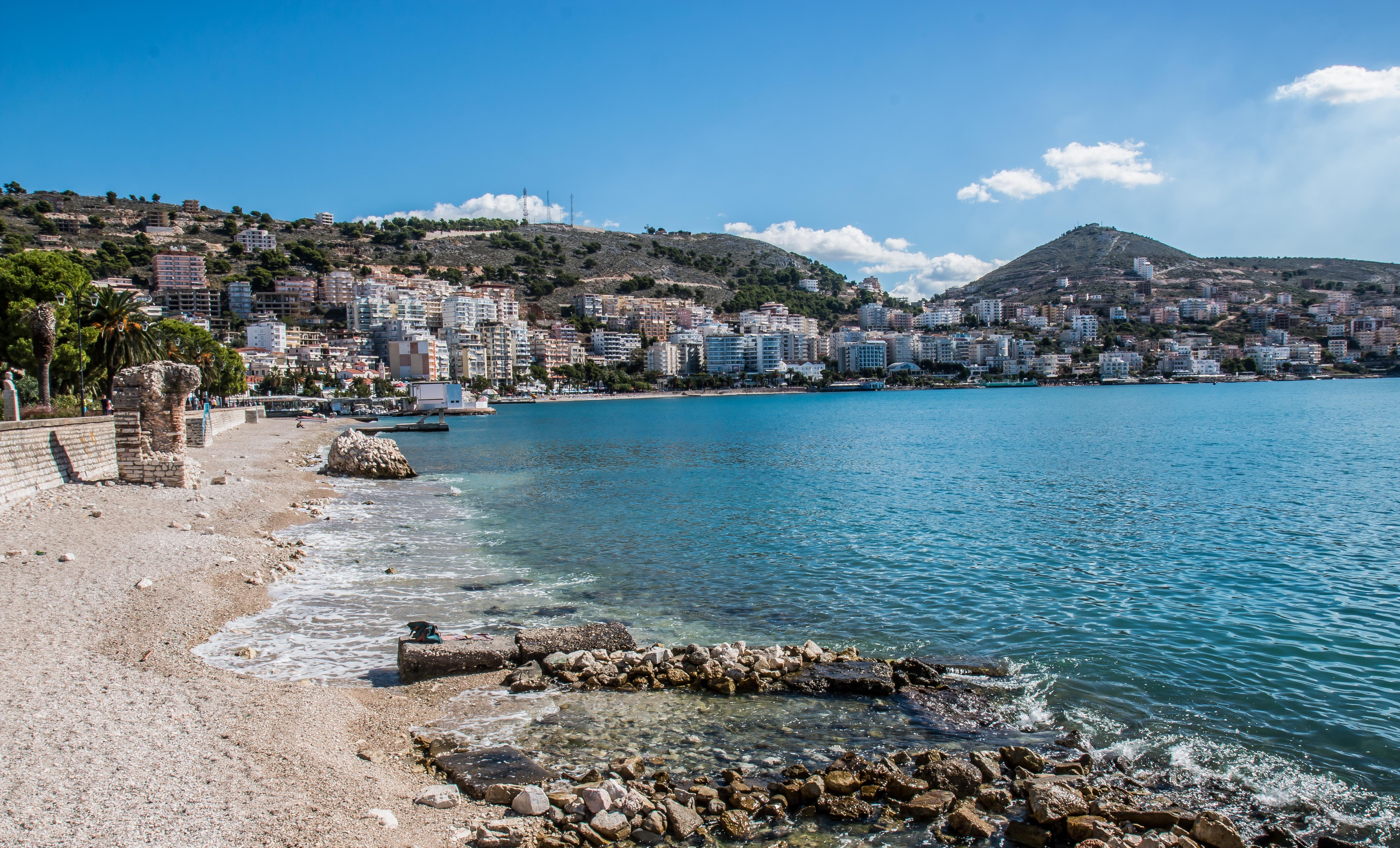
The city of Sarandë

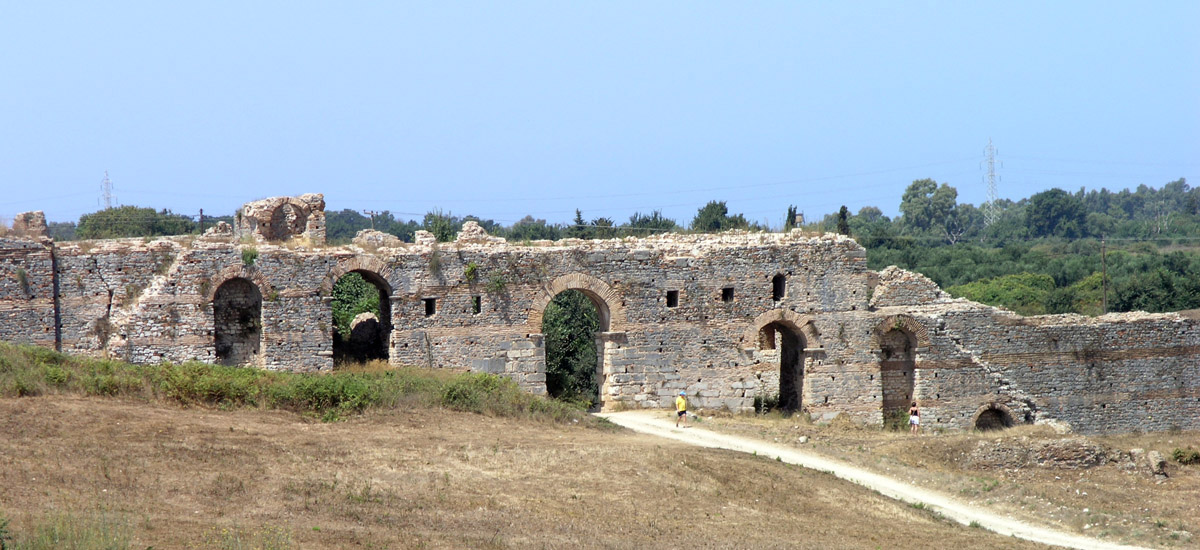
The walls of ancient Nicopolis

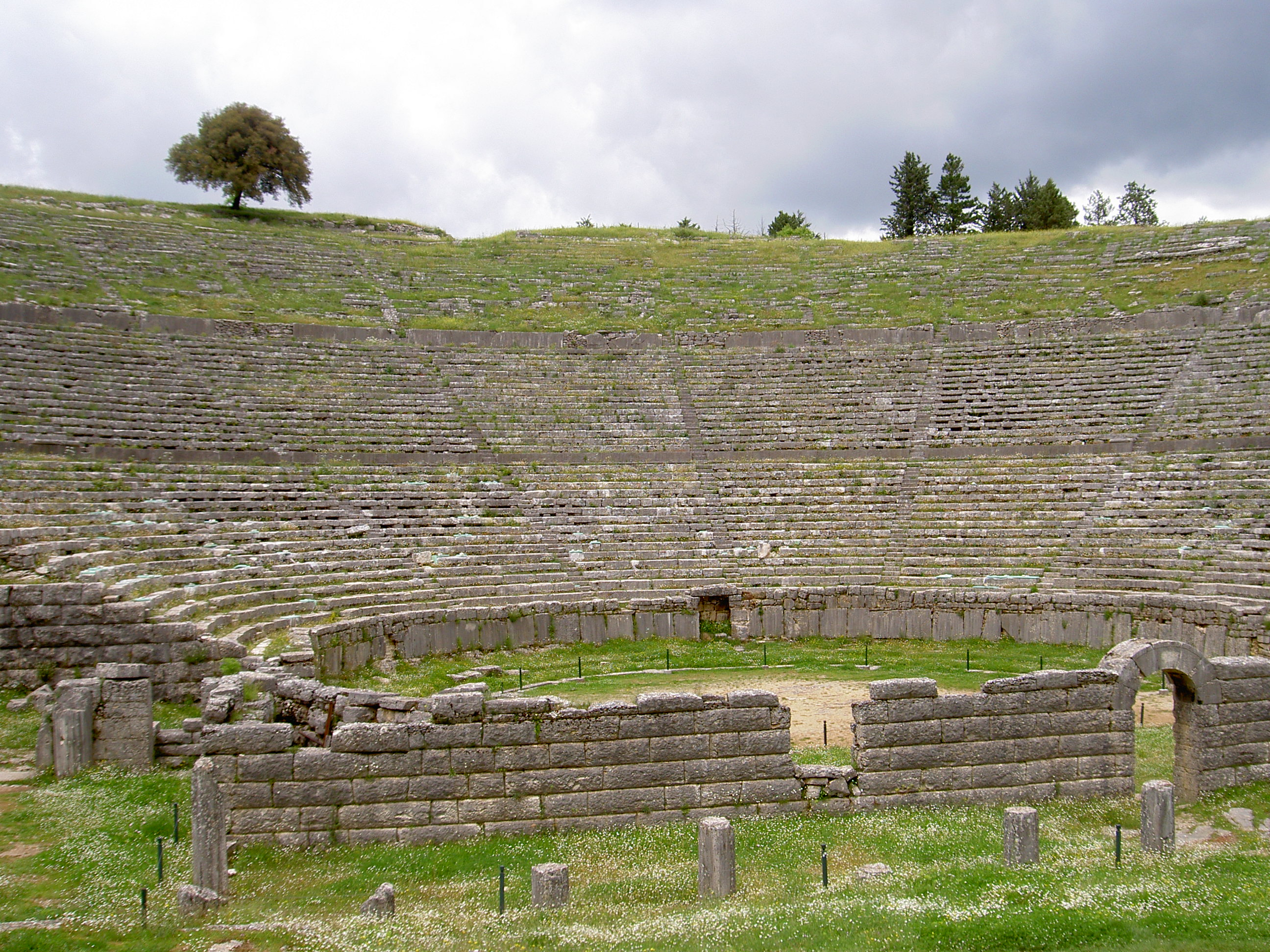
The Hellenistic theater of Dodona

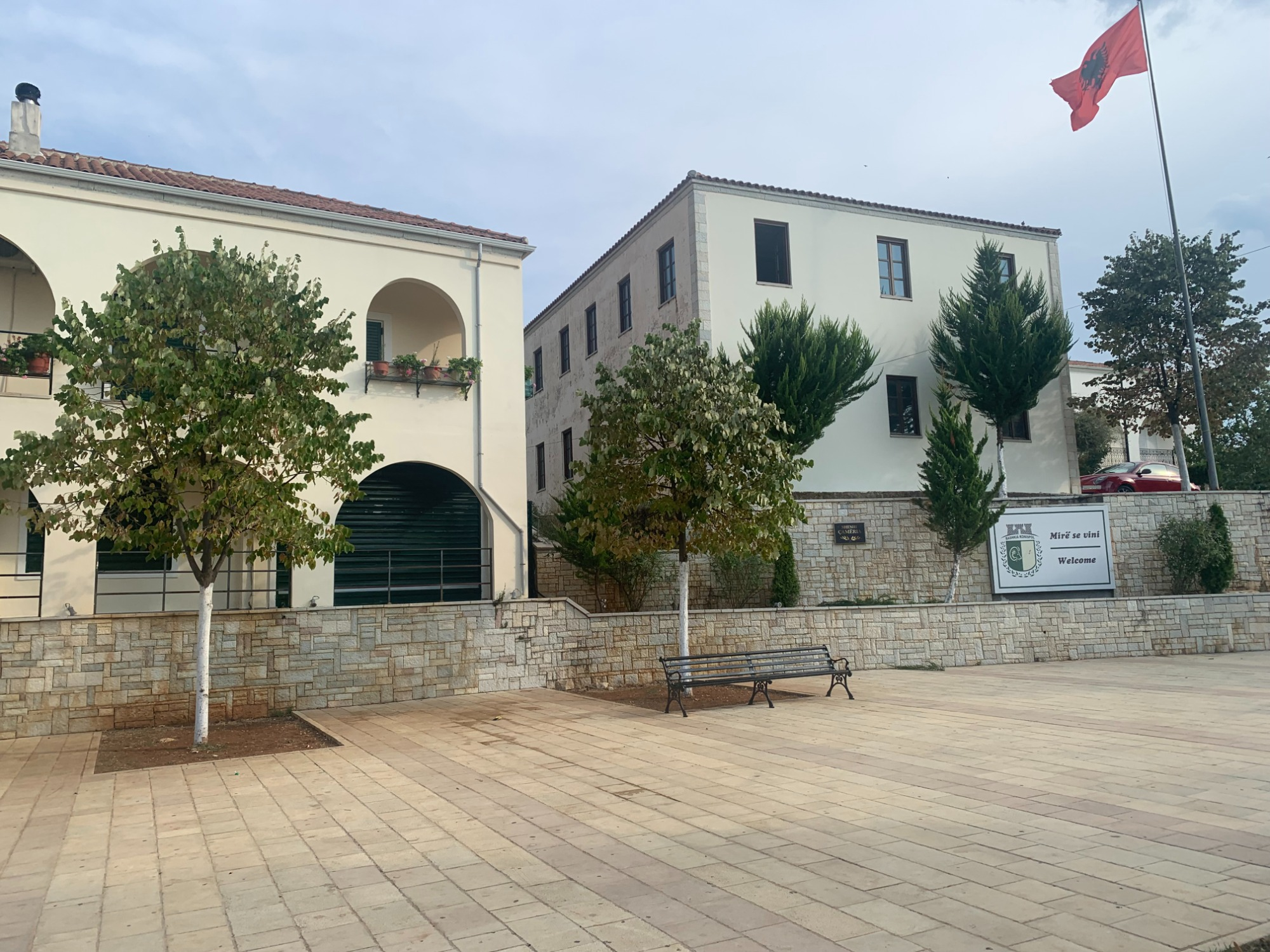
The village of Konispol

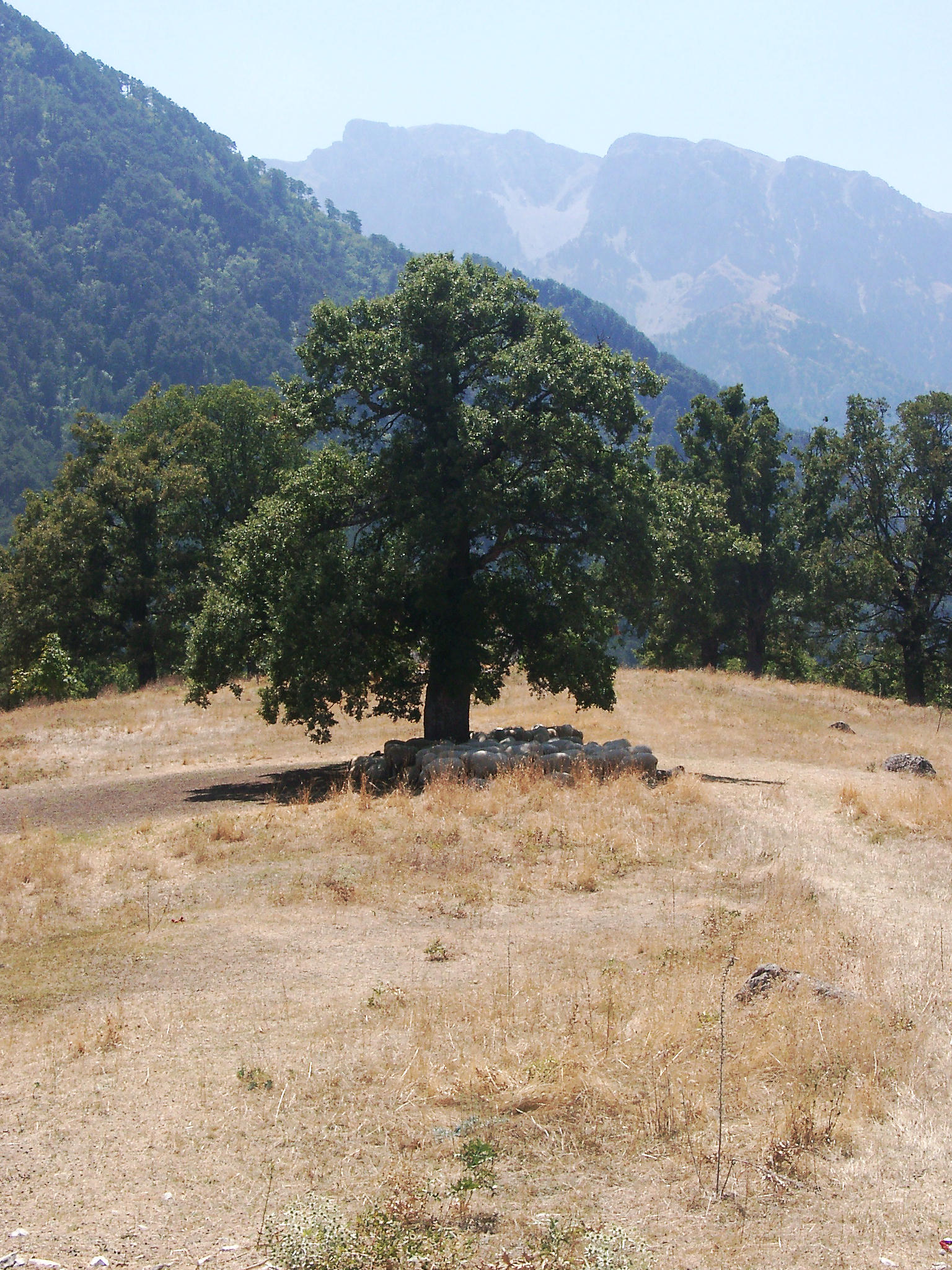
Sheep under the shade of a tree near Konitsa

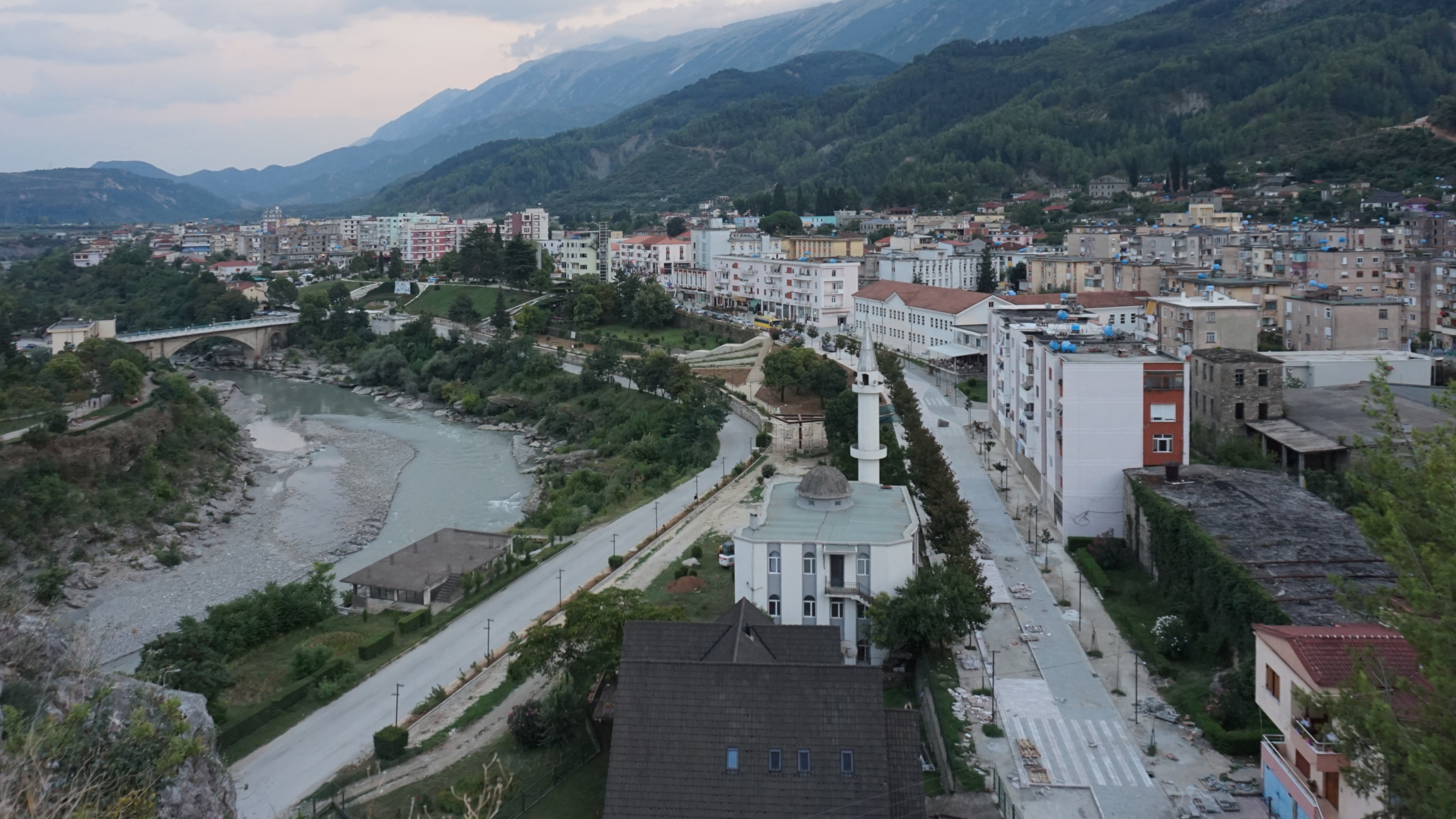
The city of Përmet

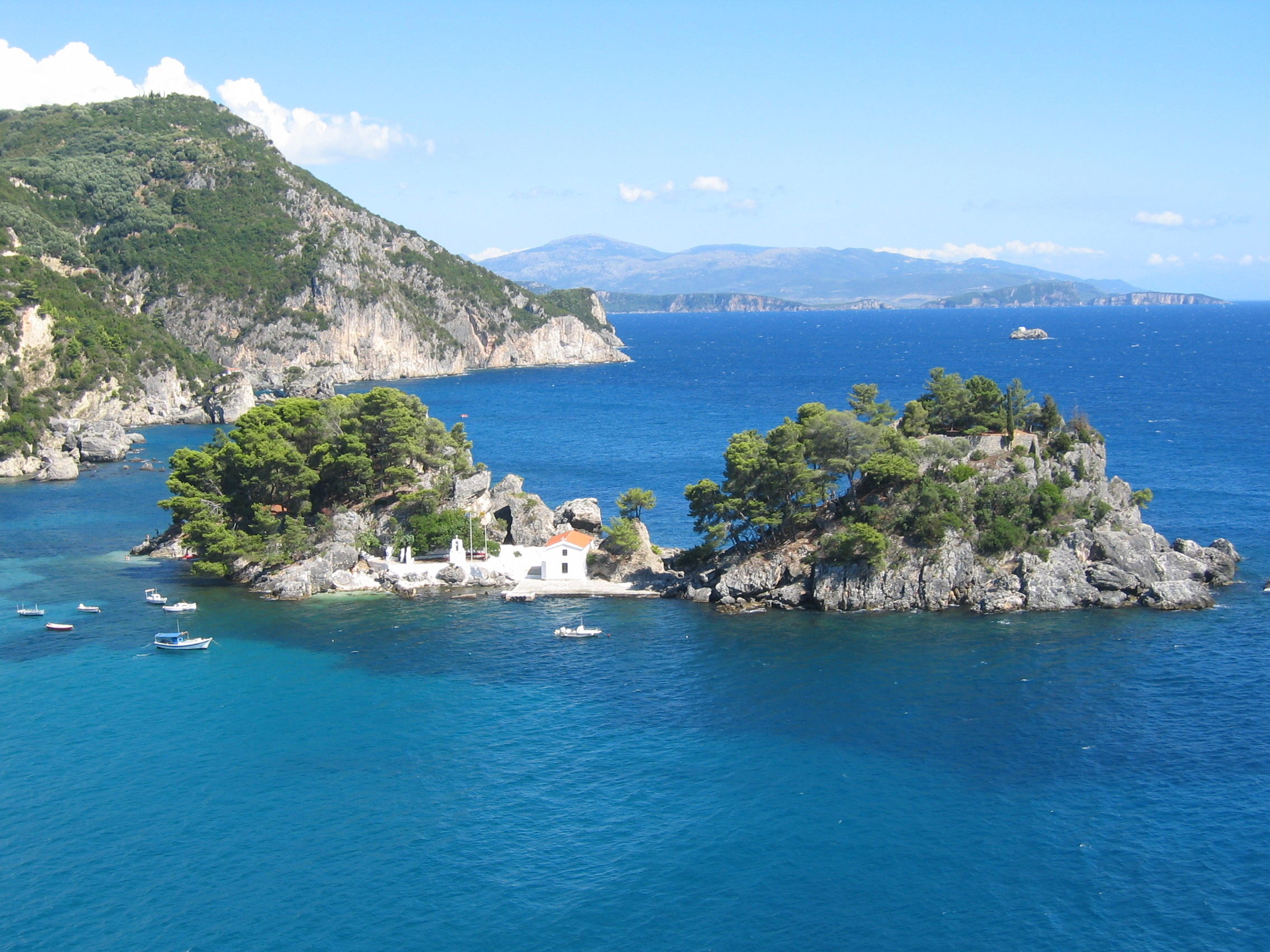
The bay of Parga

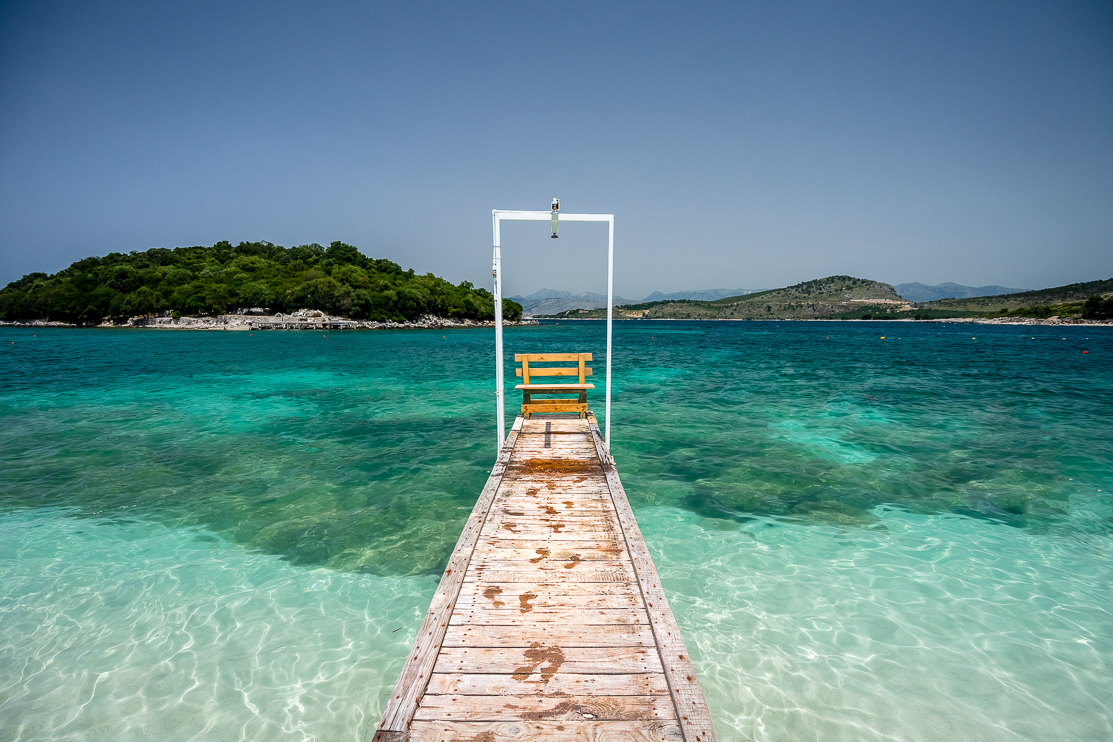
Waters of Ksamil

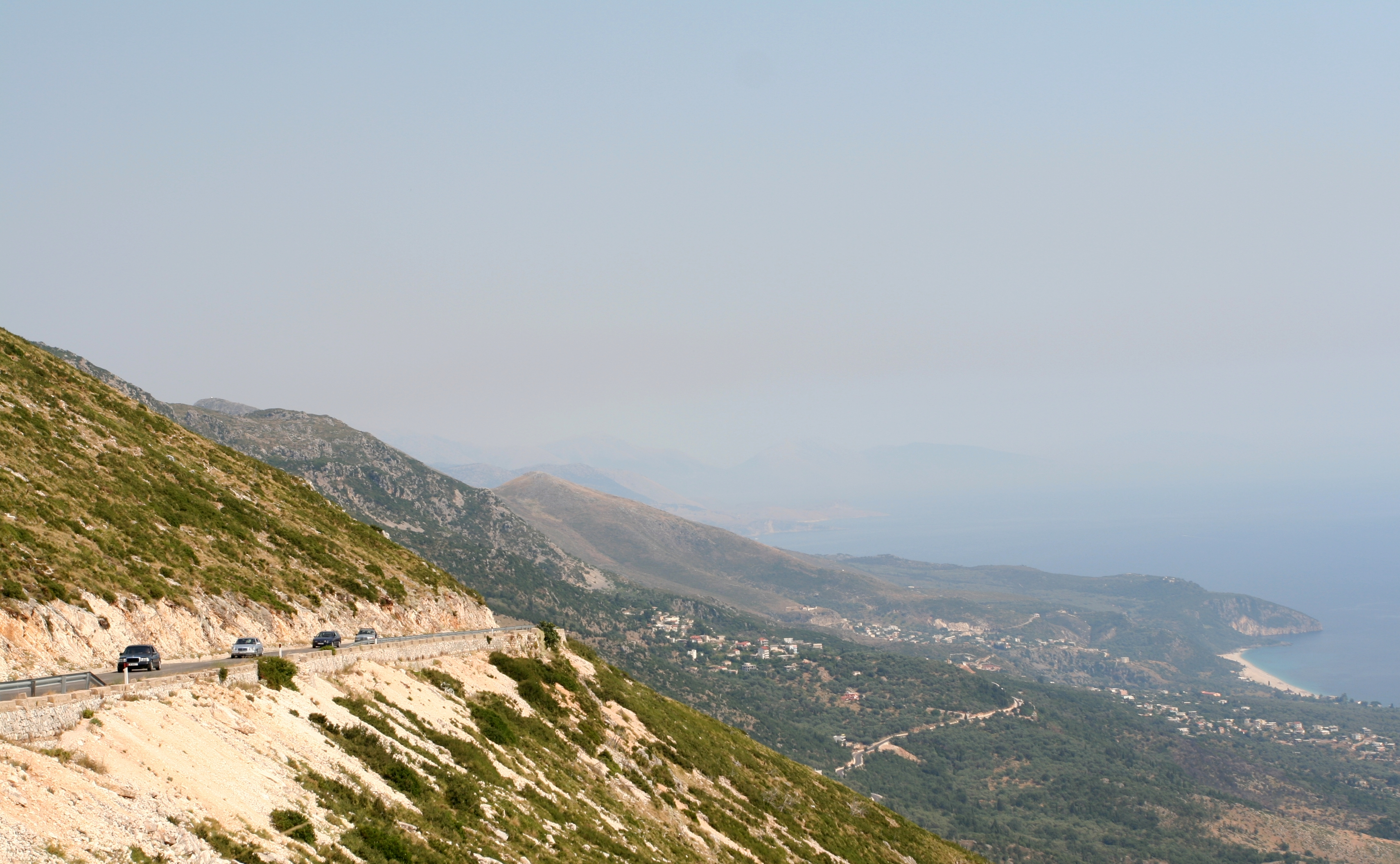
The region of Himara seen from the Llogara pass

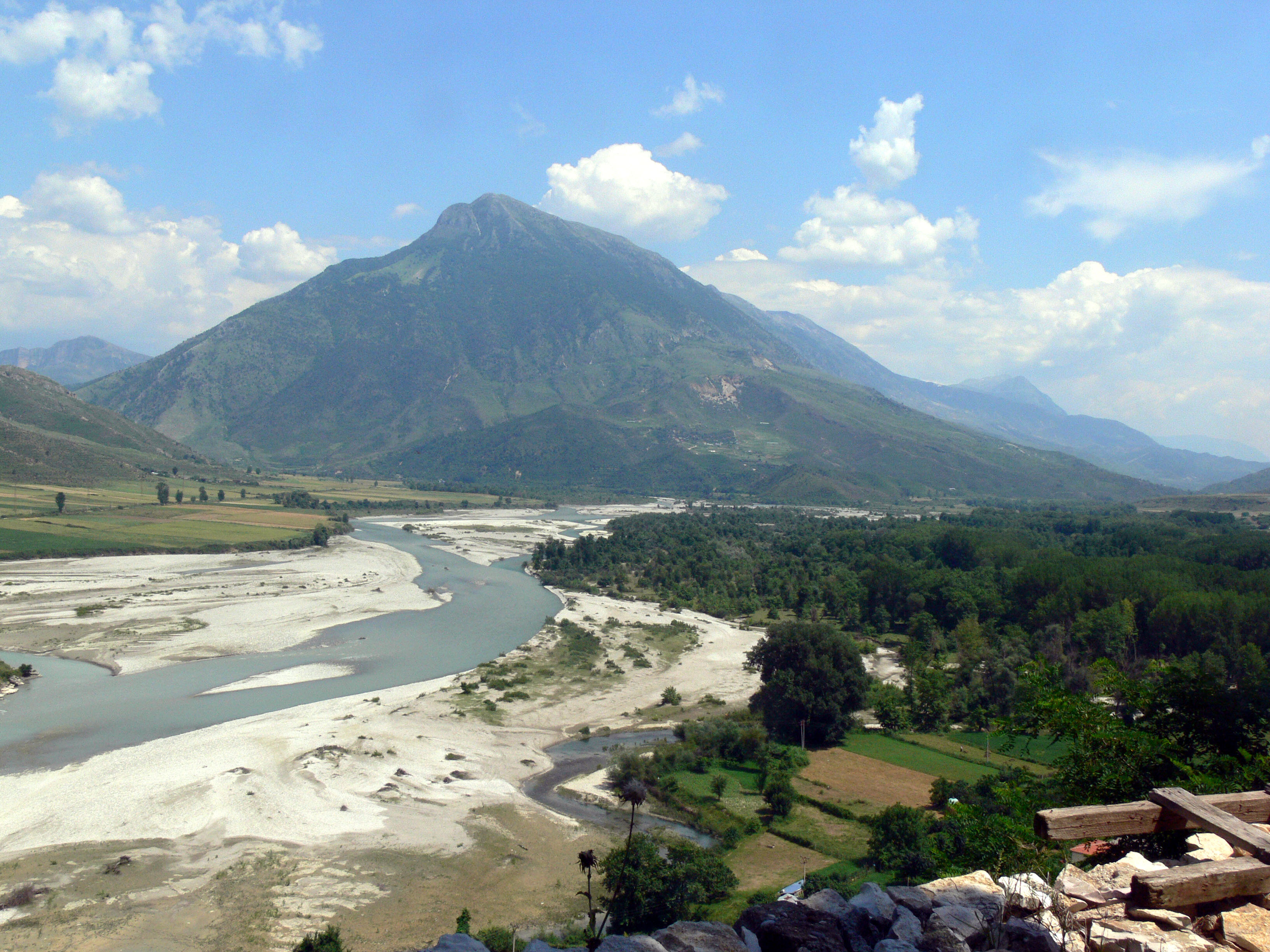
The Vjosa river near Tepelena

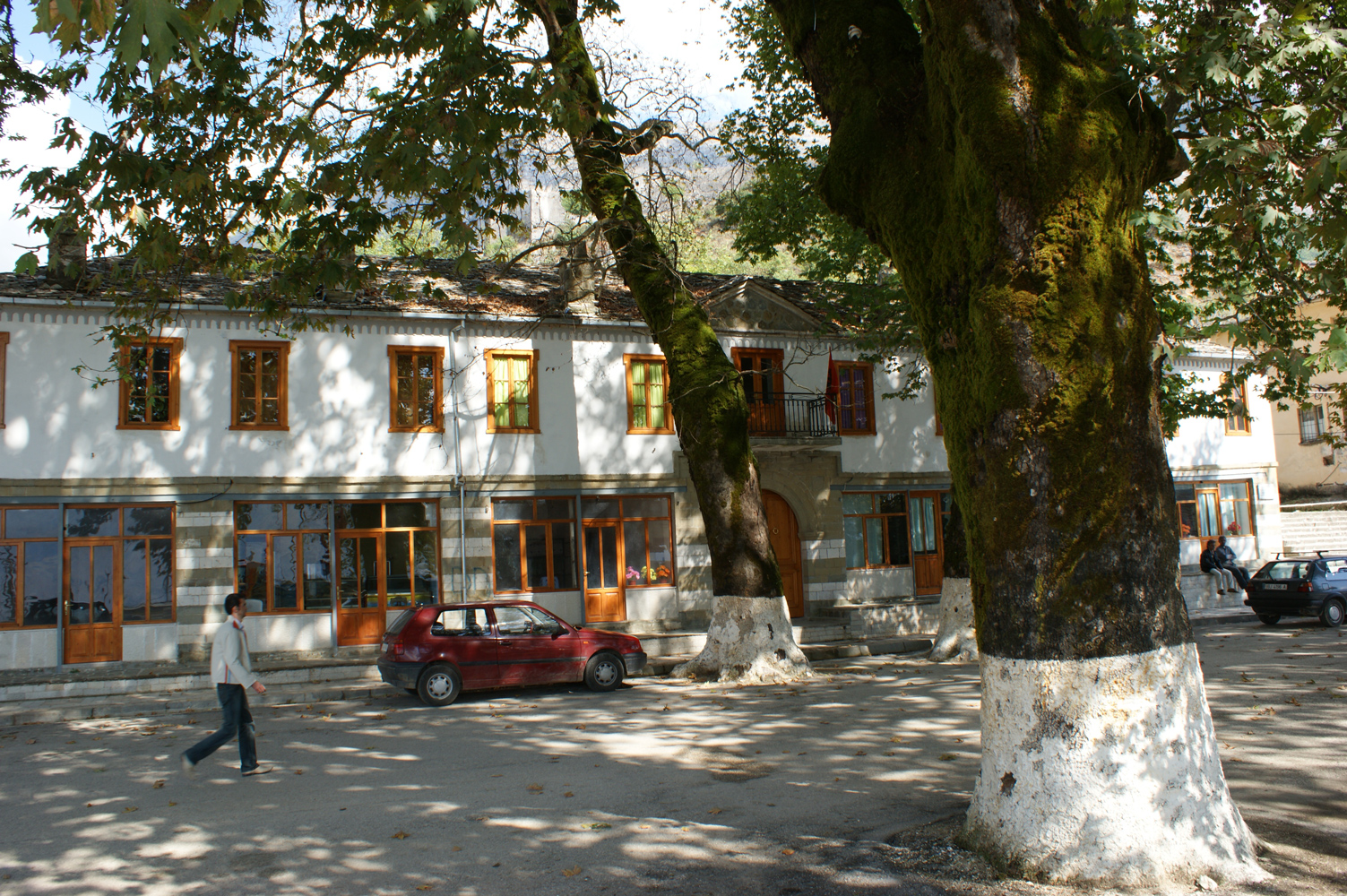
Main street of Libohovë

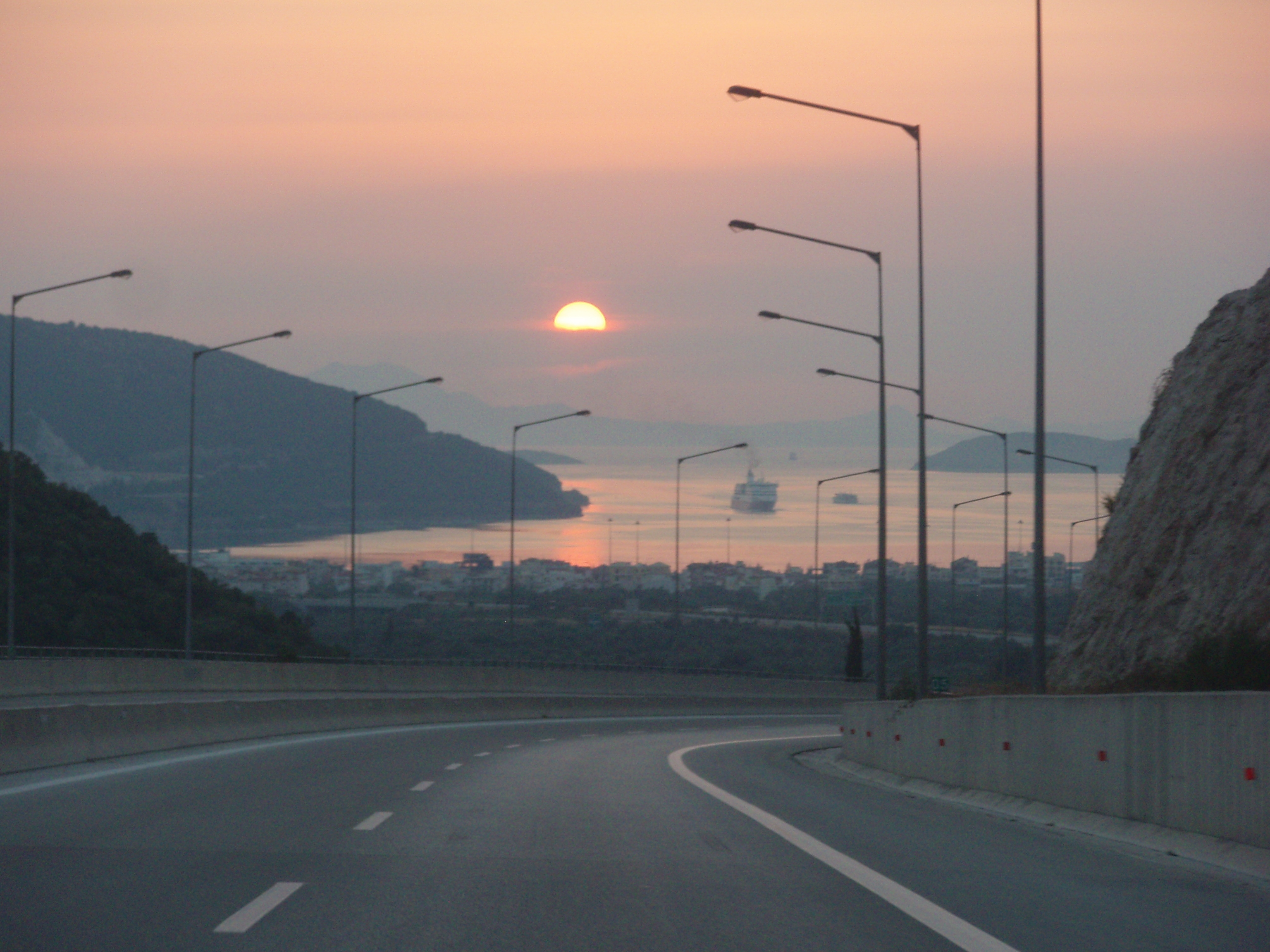
Section of the A2 motorway, near Igoumenitsa

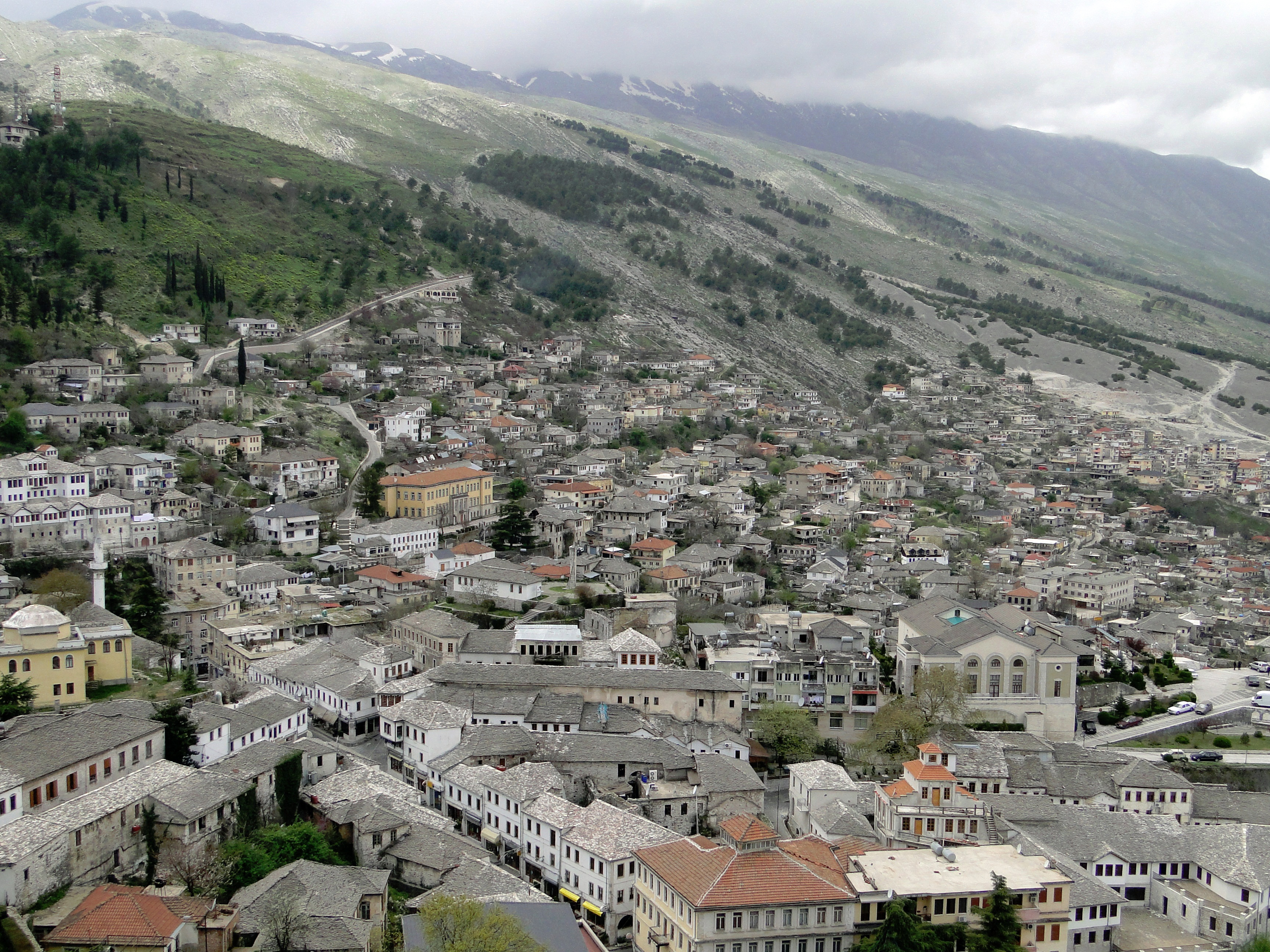
Gjirokaster, a UNESCO World Heritage Site

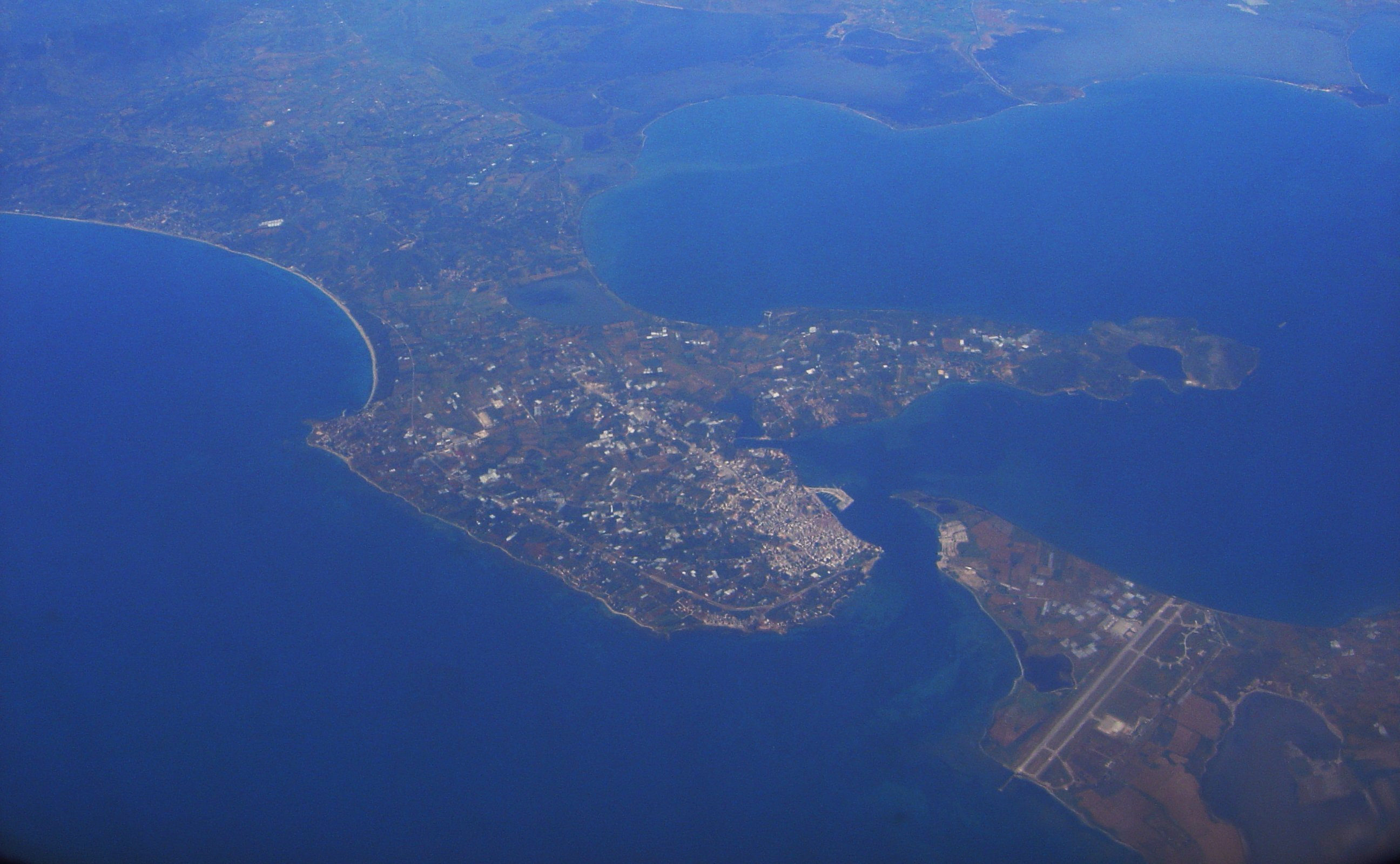
Preveza seen from the air

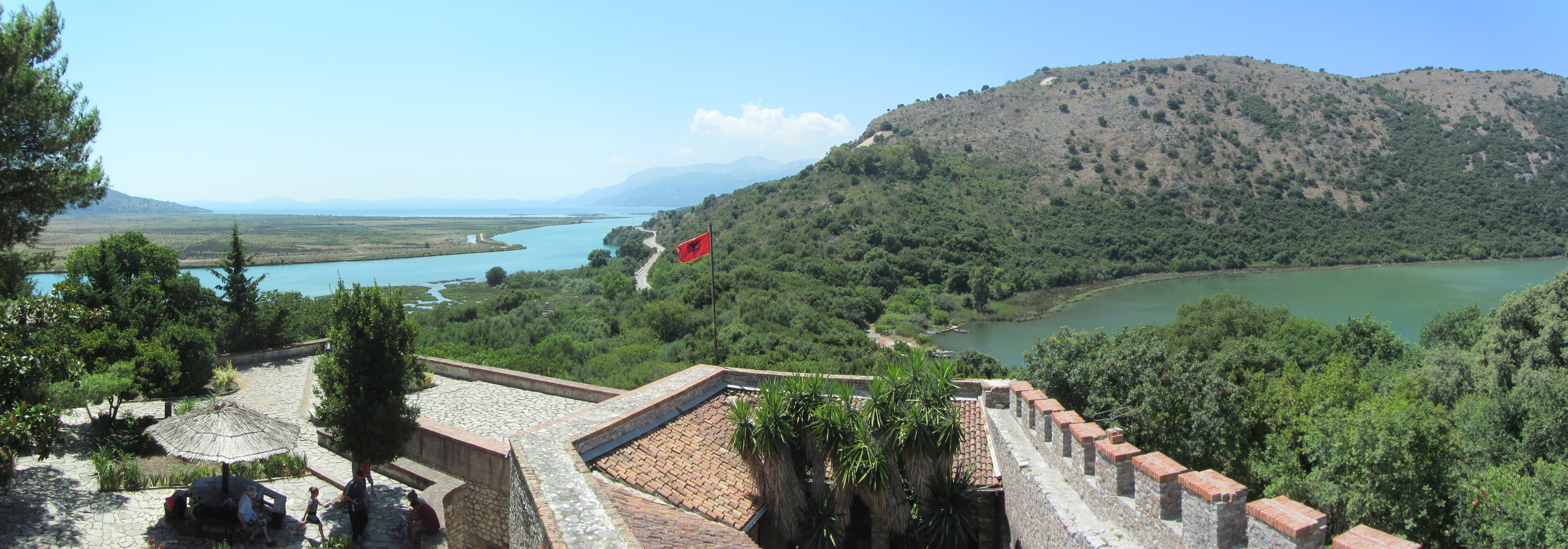
View of the Butrint Lake

== See also ==
- List of cities in ancient Epirus
- List of Epirotes
