= Neaethus =

Former river in Greece

Neaethus was a river falling into what is now the Gulf of Taranto, where the ships of the Greeks were burned by the women of Troy whom they had held captive.
