= Battle of Eryx =

276 BC battle of the Pyrrhic War in Sicily

- Part of the Sicilian Wars and the Pyrrhic War
Date	278 BC
Location	Eryx, Sicily
Result	Epirote victory

Belligerents
Epirus; Greek allies	Carthage

Commanders and leaders
Pyrrhos I	Unknown

Strength
32,500 troops	Unknown

Casualties and losses
Unknown	Unknown

The Battle of Eryx was one of the battles in the Pyrrhic War. It was held between the Kingdom of Epirus and the Magna Graecia of the Empire of Carthage, as part of the Sicilian Front in the Pyrrhic War. It ended in an Epirote victory.

== Background ==
After Pyrrhus was expelled from Macedonia, and closed his ambitions to expand his kingdom to the east, he received a request for help from the city of Tarentum against the Roman expansion in 280 BC. His army crossed the stormy Adriatic Sea and thus began the first confrontation of the Roman legions against the Macedonian phalanx and war elephants. The core of Pyrrhus' army consisted of 5,000 Macedonian phalangites, together with the phalanxes of the Epirus regions armed in the Macedonian style. Pyrrhus' army also had a small force of highly effective Thessalian cavalry, and some force from Rhodes, among other light infantry such as the Peltasts and Cretan archers. One of the main weapons of Pyrrhus' army was his war elephants, which no Roman soldier had faced before. The encounter with the Roman resistance was more difficult than he expected. He defeated the Romans with their help in the battle of Heraclea. Afterwards, their forces combined with a large number of new allies, finally defeated the Romans at the Battle of Asculum. These victories made the senators realize that the Roman legions, despite their strength, were no match for the war elephants of Pyrrhus. This understanding led to Pyrrhus' peace with Rome. After that, an agreement was made, which forced Rome to vacate the territories gained in southern Italy. Cineas, Pyrrhus' right-hand man, was in Rome to sign the treaty, when a Carthaginian fleet of 120 warships appeared off the port of Ostia, with the admiral Magon. The Carthaginians told the Romans that they were ready to unite with them against Pyrrhus. The Romans, as if reawakened by this new covenant, annulled the treaty. The same Carthaginian fleet sailed to Syracuse in Sicily, and as part of this new period of cooperation, they transferred Roman soldiers to Rhegium, in an attempt to eliminate some Campanian robbers who imitated what the Mamertines did in Messina.

Pyrrhus then received two embassies from Syracuse. After a long civil war between Thinion and Sosistratus, the city was powerless against the Carthaginian invasion, and both generals sought the support of Pyrrhus. Pyrrhus' strategic decision to march on Sicily has been debated in historiography, as it meant the opening of a new military front when the previous front was not completely closed in Italy. Apparently, Pyrrhus' plans to control the island of Sicily would be a first step towards conquering Carthage, as Agathocles had tried a few years before.

During the summer of 278 BC, Pyrrhus embarked with his troops and elephants and crossed into Sicily. The Tarentines were not pleased to see him leave, but left a garrison in that city while other forces remained in Epizephyrian Locris under his son Alexander to support their Apennine allies.

The Strait of Messina were blocked by the Mamertines and the pirates of in Rhegium, so Pyrrhus' fleet sailed from Locri, eluding the patrols of the Carthaginian fleet and landed at Tauromenium, a little south of Messina. The local tyrant Tyndarion immediately declared his allegiance to Pyrrhus. His forces joined those of Pyrrhus, and when he went to Katana he gained additional allies. The Carthaginians, with 100 ships and an army of about 50,000 men, according to the data of Diodorus Siculus, gave way to Syracuse. The arrival of Pyrrhus' army forced the besieging forces to disperse. He captured Syracuse and obtained 140 ships and several siege engines. The two leaders of Syracuse, Thinion and Sosistratus, put aside their differences and joined the cause of Pyrrhus, who appointed his son, Helenus, king of Sicily.

The city of Agrigentum, held by Sosistratus, contributed 8,000 new experienced soldiers to Pyrrhus' army. Other cities surrendered to him. Pyrrhus did not remain inactive for long and immediately began marching towards the Carthaginian cities with an army that grew to over 30,000 foot and about 1,500 cavalry, according to Plutarch. The cities of Heraclia and Azone were captured, while Selinunte, Halyciae and Segesta voluntarily surrendered. The Carthaginian soldiers fled without being able to do anything for fear of elephants. One can understand how bad the conditions were for the Carthaginian mercenaries, as they retreated through hostile territory, without food. The casualties must have been great. No wonder the Carthaginian leaders avoided land battles as they relied on their naval superiority to try to stop the advance of the Epirotes.

== Battle ==
The fortress city of Eryx on the northwest coast was held by a large Carthaginian garrison and had strong natural defensive features. Pyrrhus first surrounded Eryx with catapults and Ballistas, and then with ladders, so that his soldiers could climb the wall. He was the first to climb the walls and fought bravely, driving many defenders into the city himself. After a difficult siege, the city was captured.

== Afterwards ==
Pyrrhus then continued on his way, in order to conquer Cranita, but his failed siege of Lilybaeum led to his defeat in Sicily.
