= Siege of Venusia =

Military event during the Pyrrhic War (279 BC)

- Part of the Pyrrhic War
Date	279 BC
Location	Venusia, Apulia
Result	Epirote victory

Belligerents
Epirus; Samnites	Roman Republic

Commanders and leaders
Pyrrhus	Unknown

The siege of Venusia or capture of Venusia was a military event during the Pyrrhic War in 279 BC. During the campaign, forces of the Kingdom of Epirus, commanded by Pyrrhus, successfully took control of the strategic Roman Latin colony of Venusia.

== Background ==
Venusia was established as a Latin colony in Apulia in 291 BC. Along with Luceria (established in 314 BC), it played a vital role in Roman strategy to control Apulia and exert pressure on the Samnites. Control of Apulia allowed the Romans to penetrate the mountains of Samnium from multiple directions while simultaneously preventing Samnite raids into the plains. Following their defeat at the Battle of Heraclea in 280 BC, Roman forces had retreated to Venusia to regroup and recover.

== Pyrrhus's strategic goals ==
After the Battle of Asculum in the summer of 279 BC, Pyrrhus realized that a renewed advance on Rome or Campania would likely be fruitless. Consequently, he decided to focus on consolidating his positions in southern Italy, which required expelling the Romans from Apulia. For Pyrrhus, controlling this region would relieve the pressure on his Samnite allies and provide enhanced protection for the Greek cities along the southern coast.

== Capture of the city ==
Employing a combination of military force and diplomacy, Pyrrhus achieved success in Apulia. According to the Byzantine historian Zonaras, Pyrrhus captured the colony of Venusia, and possibly Luceria as well, thereby undermining Roman local control and breaking their dominance over the region.

The exact nature of Venusia's fall is a subject of debate among modern historians. The historian E. T. Salmon has suggested that Venusia possessed heavy defensive fortifications, making it unlikely to have fallen through a conventional, full-scale military siege. Regardless of whether it was taken by force or diplomatic maneuvering, the Romans lost control of the important colony, and it was temporarily integrated into Pyrrhus's network of allies and holdings.
