= Battle of the Cranita hills =

Battle in 277 BC

Battle of the Cranita Hills
- Part of the Pyrrhic War
Date	277 BC
Location	Cranita hills, Samnium
Result	Samnite victory

Belligerents
Roman Republic	Samnites

Commanders and leaders
Publius Cornelius Rufinus; Caius Junius Bubulcus	Unknown

The Battle of the Cranita Hills was fought in 277 BC between a Roman and a Samnite army during the Pyrrhic War (280-275 BC). The Samnite people allied with King Pyrrhus of Epirus against the Roman Republic to regain the independence that they had lost during the Roman Samnite wars, but when Pyrrhus left Italy in 278 BC for Sicily, Pyrrhus' Italian allies were left to defend against the Romans on their own.

In 277 the consuls Publius Cornelius Rufinus and Caius Junius Bubulcus invaded Samnium, devastating the country as they went, and took several deserted forts. The Samnites had retreated to a range of hills called Cranita, because of the large growths of cornel-wood (crania) they bore, where they had conveyed their most valuable treasures. Despite the difficulty of the terrain the Romans ascended the hills, but the undergrowth and the steep climb made them easy prey for the Samnite attack, which killed and took prisoner many Romans.

After their defeat at the Cranita hills both Roman consuls blamed each other for the debacle and no longer worked together. Junius went on ravaging a portion of Samnium, while Rufinus campaigned against the Lucanians and Bruttians and captured Croton.

== Sources ==
- Dio, Cassius. Historia Romana.
