= Battle of Rhegium (278 BC) =

Historical events involving Rhegium during the Pyrrhic War (278 BC)

Situation at Rhegium
- Part of the Pyrrhic War
Date	278 BC
Location	Rhegium, Calabria
Result	Control maintained by the Campanian garrison; Pyrrhus bypasses the straits

Belligerents
Roman Republic; Carthage; Campanian garrison of Rhegium	Epirus

Commanders and leaders
Unknown	Pyrrhus

During the Pyrrhic War, the strategic city of Rhegium (located in the strait between Italy and Sicily) became a major focal point of conflict, betrayal, and joint operations involving Rome, Carthage, and the Epirote forces of Pyrrhus in 278 BC.

== Background and situation at Rhegium ==
Earlier in the conflict, the Romans had stationed a garrison in Rhegium—consisting of several thousand troops, largely Campanian allies—to secure the strategic strait and prevent the city from aligning with Pyrrhus. However, emulating the Mamertines in Sicily, the garrison ultimately betrayed the city. They murdered the male citizens, seized their property and women, and took full control of Rhegium for themselves.

== The strait blockade and Pyrrhus's crossing ==
When Pyrrhus prepared to cross into Sicily in 278 BC to aid the western Greeks, his passage was heavily contested. The geopolitical situation around the straits was hostile:

- On the Italian side, the renegade Roman Campanian garrison controlled Rhegium.
- On the Sicilian side, the Mamertines and the Carthaginians formed an alliance against Pyrrhus.
- A Carthaginian fleet of roughly 30 warships actively patrolled the straits.

Recognizing the extreme risk of a direct crossing through the strait, Pyrrhus chose to bypass Rhegium entirely. Moving his forces to the friendly port of Locri on the eastern side of the Italian toe, he successfully sailed across open water to Tauromenium in Sicily, evading Carthaginian patrols and avoiding the blockade.

== Roman-Carthaginian joint operations ==
While Pyrrhus operated in Sicily, Rome and Carthage cooperated against his supply lines. Sources note a joint operation where Roman soldiers (numbering around 500) boarded Carthaginian ships to target Pyrrhus' shipbuilding resources and raid his Bruttian allies—who were supplying timber to the Epirote fleet—using Rhegium as a strategic base. The rogue Campanian garrison within the city likely supported or cooperated with this joint Roman-Punic effort.
