= Cineas =

3rd century BCE Greek from Thessaly, advisor of Pyrrhus of Epirus

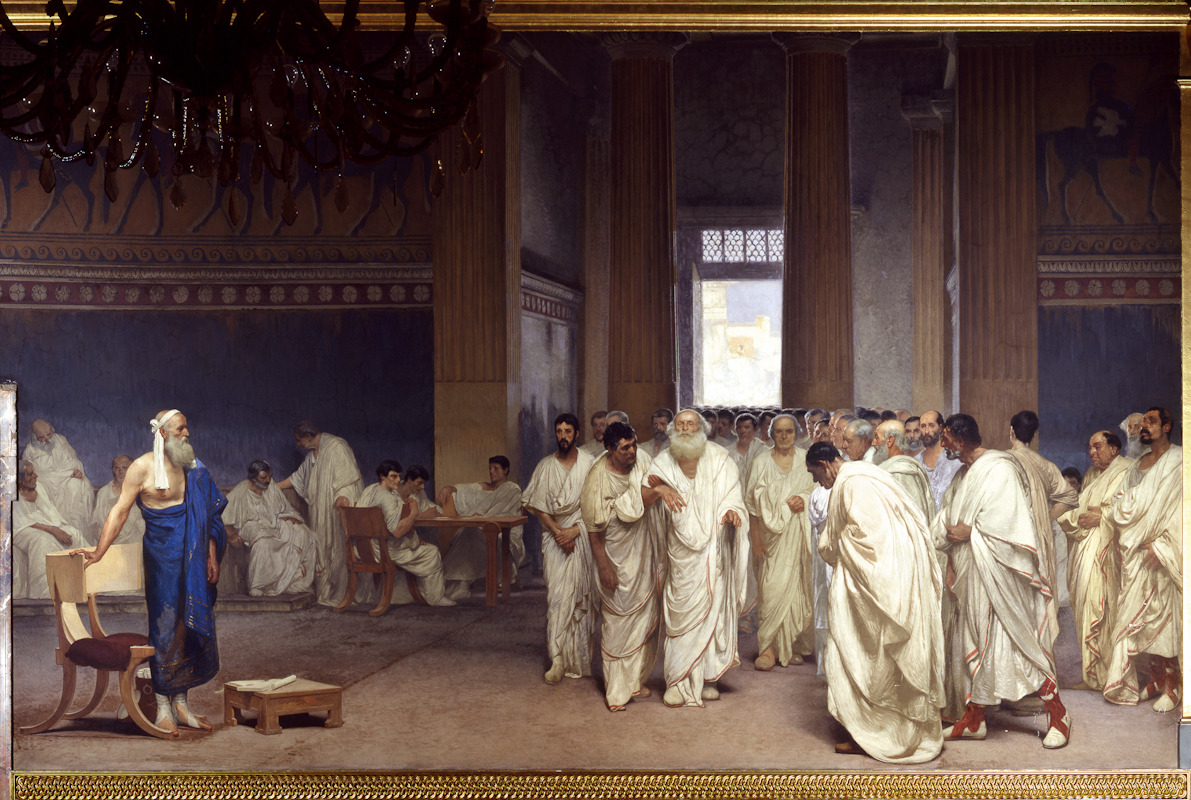
Painting by Cesare Maccari, depicting Cineas (blue clothing) during his meeting with the Roman Senate

Cineas (Greek: Κινέας; c. 350–277 BC) was a Thessalian diplomat and historian who served as an important adviser of King Pyrrhus of Epirus. He had a reputation for great wisdom and was a pupil of Demosthenes the orator and was the only man who could be compared in skill with Demosthenes. Pyrrhus held him in high regard. Cineas was an Epicurean according to Cicero and Plutarch.

== Biography ==
Historian Johannes Engels estimated that Cineas was born in Thessaly around 350 BC. A pupil of Demosthenes and follower of Epicureanism, Cineas was a highly trusted advisor for Pyrrhus and his chief diplomat. He appears to have often acted as a moderating force in the king's council, urging restraint and diplomatic approaches when others –including Pyrrhus himself– favored blunt and daring actions. Plutarch wrote that Pyrrhus sent Cineas to many cities in Greece as an ambassador and managed to take more settlements thanks to the diplomat's eloquence than through conquest. Cineas was also active as an author, writing an epitome of the military treatises of Aeneas Tacticus as well as an Thessalian history.

Ancient sources agree that prior to Pyrrhus undertaking the Pyrrhic War, Cineas tried to dissuade him from waging war against Rome in Italy and urged him to be satisfied with the possessions he already had. According to Plutarch, Cineas asked Pyrrhus a series of questions: how he would use a victory against the Romans, what he would do after taking Italy, whether his expedition would stop with the taking of Sicily (according to Plutarch, Pyrrhus wanted to take Sicily as well as Italy) and, since Pyrrhus said that he would go on to take Libya and Carthage so that no enemies who threatened him would offer further resistance, he asked what he would do "when we have got everything subject to us". The reply of Pyrrhus to the last question was: "We shall be much at ease, and we'll drink bumpers, my good man, every day, and we'll gladden one another's hearts with confidential talks." Cineas got Pyrrhus where he wanted in order to make his point and said: "Surely this privilege is ours already, and we have at hand, without taking any trouble, those things to which we hope to attain by bloodshed and great toils and perils, after doing much harm to others and suffering much ourselves." Cassius Dio wrote that Cineas saw the folly of Pyrrhus' expedition and tried to dissuade him. He wrote: "[Pyrrhus] intended by his prowess to rule the whole earth, whereas Cineas urged him to be satisfied with his own possessions, which were sufficient for enjoyment. But the king's fondness for war and fondness for leadership prevailed against the advice of Cineas and caused him to depart in disgrace from both Sicily and Italy, after losing in all of the battles countless thousands of his own forces."

Pyrrhus did not listen to Cineas. Ostensibly, the king waged war against Rome to support the Greek city of Tarentum, in southern Italy, in a dispute with the Romans. Before sailing to Tarentum, Pyrrhus sent Cineas to that city in advance with some troops. This helped to sway the people of Tarentum from attempting a reconciliation with Rome.

After his victory in the Battle of Heraclea, Pyrrhus sent his ambassador Cineas to negotiate with the Romans. Cineas offered to free the Roman prisoners, also promised to help the Romans with the subjugation of Italy and asked only friendship and immunity for Tarentum in return. Though some Roman aristocrats such as Gaius Fabricius Luscinus openly expressed their disdain of Cineas' philosophical views, the diplomat quickly learnt the names of numerous senators and endeared himself to them through praise, expertise as well as diplomacy. Many senators became inclined towards peace (in Plutarch's account) or a truce (in Cassius Dio's account) because the Romans would have to face a larger army as the Italic peoples who were allies of Pyrrhus had now joined him. However, Appius Claudius Caecus, who was old and blind and had been confined to his house, had himself carried to the senate house in a litter. He said that Pyrrhus was not to be trusted and that a truce (or peace) was not advantageous to the state. He called for Cineas to be dismissed from the city immediately and for Pyrrhus to be told to withdraw to his country and to make his propositions from there. The senate voted unanimously to send away Cineas that very day and to continue the war for so long as Pyrrhus was in Italy. Cineas reportedly compared the Romans to the legendary Lernaean Hydra, assessing that the Romans now had twice as many soldiers as those who fought at the Battle of Heraclea and that "there were many times as many Romans still who were capable of bearing arms."

The war in Italy dragged on, and Pyrrhus became increasingly dissatisfied with his inability to inflict lasting damage on the Romans. As a result, the king responded favorably to a request by the Greek Sicilians to intervene on their island against the Carthaginian Empire, seeing this as a chance to extricate himself from a stalemate. In 278 BC, Pyrrhus sent Cineas as his envoy to Syracuse to negotiate the terms of his assistance as well as prepare the Epirote intervention. Afterward, Cineas disappeared from historical records. Historian Jeff Champion argued that the advisor probably died during the early stages of Pyrrhus' campaign in Sicily. Similarly, Engels estimated the diplomat's death at c. 277 BC. Champion reasoned that Cineas' "absence [...] removed all restraint from the king", explaining Pyrrhus' increasingly brutal and tactless behavior during and after the Siege of Lilybaeum. Having alienated the Sicilian cities and failed to fully defeat the Carthaginians, Pyrrhus' campaign collapsed and he was forced to retreat back to Italy in 276 BC.

== See also ==
- Pyrrhic victory
