= Battle of the Aous =

Battle of the Aous or Aoos can refer to one of the following battles fought at or near the Aoös river (modern Vjosa) in Epirus (modern Greece and Albania):

- Battle of the Aous (274 BC), between Epirus and Macedonia
- Battle of the Aous (198 BC), between Macedonia and the Romans
