= Battle of the Strait of Messina =

Sea battle between Carthage and Epirus (276 BC)

Coordinates: 38°14′45″N 15°37′57″E

- Part of the Sicilian Wars and the Pyrrhic War
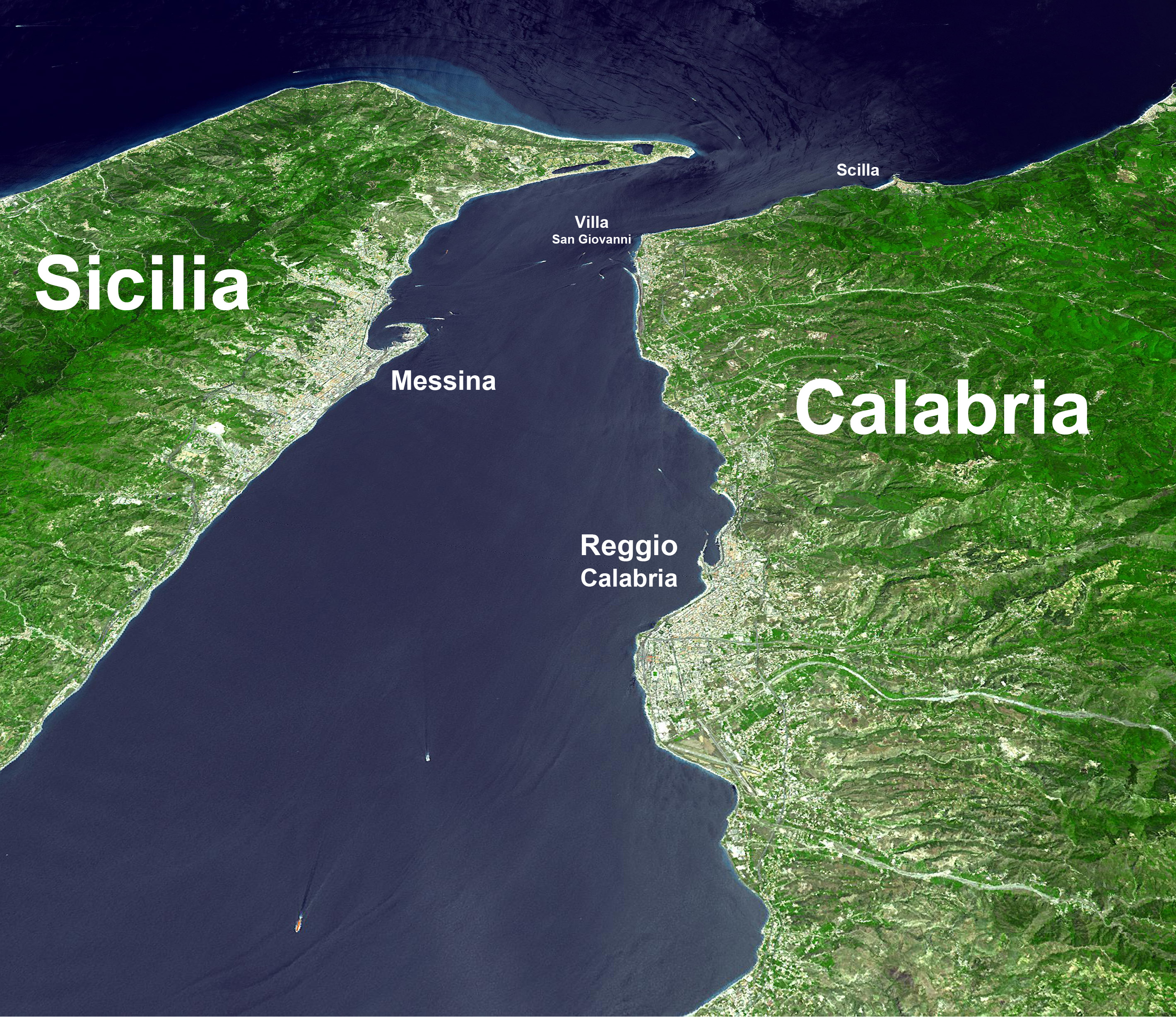
Date	276 BC
Location	Strait of Messina
Result	Carthaginian victory

Belligerents
Carthage	Epirus

Commanders and leaders
Unknown	Pyrrhos I

Strength
Unknown	110 warships

Casualties and losses
Unknown	70 warships sunk 28 warships damaged

The Battle of the Strait of Messina was fought in 276 BC when a Carthaginian fleet attacked the Sicilian fleet of Pyrrhus of Epirus, who was crossing the strait to Italy. Pyrrhus had left Italy for Sicily on the Autumn of 278 BC and scored several major victories against the Carthaginian armies, but Roman successes against Pyrrhus' Italian allies convinced him to return to Italy.

While Pyrrhus was transporting his troops to Rhegium his fleet of 110 decked warships and hundreds of transports was attacked by the Carthaginians. The Carthaginian navy sank 70 of the Greek ships and damaged 28. Pyrrhus' surviving ships, amounting to 12 warships plus the transport ships, docked at Locri where he had left his son Alexander when he opened his Sicilian campaign.

== Sources ==
- Venning, Timothy; Drinkwater, John (2011). Chronology of the Roman Empire. Continuum International Publishing Group. ISBN 978-1-4411-5478-1.
- Cowan, Ross (2007). For the glory of Rome:a history of warriors and warfare. MBI Publishing Company. ISBN 978-1-85367-733-5.
- Mommsen's History of Rome. Wildside Press LLC. 2008. ISBN 978-1-4344-6232-9.
