= Battle of Beneventum (275 BC) =

275 BC Battle of the Pyrrhic war

- Part of the Pyrrhic War
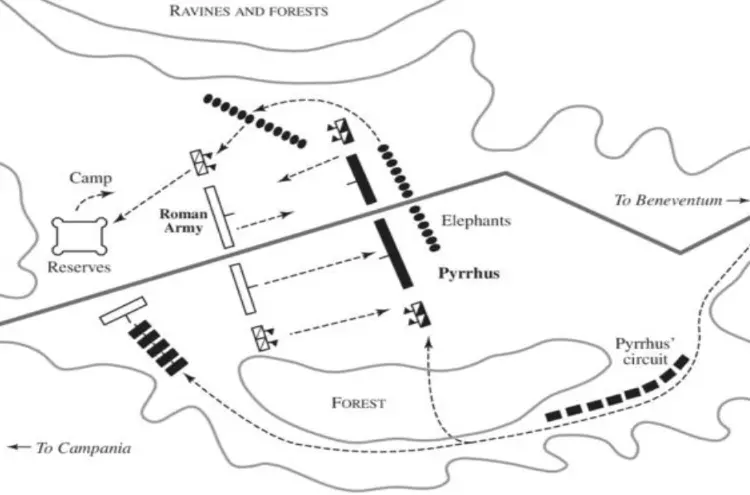
- Illustration of the maneuvers of the Battle of Beneventum.
Date	275 BC
Location	Beneventum (modern Benevento), Campania, Italy 41°08′N 14°47′E
Result	Inconclusive, Roman strategic victory

Belligerents
Roman Republic	Epirus

Commanders and leaders
Manius Curius Dentatus	Pyrrhus of Epirus

Strength
20,000-25,000 (modern estimates)	20,000 (Plutarch); ~40,000 (modern estimates); At least 10 elephants

Casualties and losses
Unknown	2 elephants killed 8 elephants captured Heavy losses among troops
- Location within modern Italy

The Battle of Beneventum (275 BC) was the last battle of the Pyrrhic War. It was fought near Beneventum, in southern Italy, between the forces of Pyrrhus, king of Epirus in Greece, and the Romans, led by consul Manius Curius Dentatus. The result was a strategic Roman victory and Pyrrhus was forced to return to Tarentum, and later to Epirus.

== Background ==
Pyrrhus's campaign leading up to the battle.

The Pyrrhic War broke out when Pyrrhus, the king of Epirus, in Greece sailed to southern Italy, ostensibly to aid the Greek city of Tarentum in southern Italy in a dispute with the Romans. Ancient historians agreed that his real motive was the conquest of Italy. Besides the Tarentines, three Italic peoples of southern Italy, the Samnites, Lucani and Bruttii, who were in conflict with the Romans, fought alongside the forces of this Greek king. Pyrrhus won two battles (the Battle of Heraclea and the Battle of Asculum) which were highly wasteful for him because he suffered heavy casualties. He realised that he could not sustain more battles with the Romans. They depleted his forces, whereas the pool of military manpower of the Romans was far superior. Consequently, when he was asked by the Greek city-states of eastern and southern Sicily to help them against the Carthaginians in the western part of the island, he accepted and went to Sicily. This aggrieved his allies in southern Italy, who were left to their own devices against the Romans. Pyrrhus seized all the Carthaginian domains except for Lilybaeum, which he failed to capture. He then decided to build a large fleet to attack the Carthaginians in Africa. In order to man and equip this fleet he treated the Greek city-states despotically. Many of them turned against him. This forced him to leave Sicily and return to Italy.

== Battle ==
Plutarch gave the most detailed account of the battle. He wrote that during the three years Pyrrhus spent campaigning in Sicily, the Samnites suffered many defeats at the hands of the Romans and lost a substantial part of their territory. This made them resentful towards Pyrrhus. Therefore, most of them did not join him when he returned to southern Italy. Cassius Dio wrote that the Samnites being hard pressed by the Romans caused Pyrrhus to set forth again to come to their assistance. In Plutarch's account, Pyrrhus engaged the Romans despite the lack of Samnite support. The two consuls for 275 BC, Lucius Cornelius Lentulus Caudinus and Manius Curius Dentatus, were fighting in Lucania and Samnium respectively.

Plutarch wrote that Pyrrhus divided his forces into two divisions. He sent one of them against Cornelius Lentulus and marched with the other force during the night against Manius Curius, who was encamped near Beneventum and was waiting for help from Cornelius Lentulus. Pyrrhus was in a hurry to engage Manius Curius in case his colleague would show up. However, his soldiers lost their way and fell behind because he went a long way round through woods and his lights did not hold out. Dionysius of Halicarnassus wrote that Pyrrhus marched through "long trails that were not even used by people but were mere goat-paths through woods and crags, would keep no order and, even before the enemy came in sight, would be weakened in body by thirst and fatigue." This delayed Pyrrhus and at dawn he was in full view of the enemy as he advanced on them from the heights. Plutarch wrote that Manius Curius led his men out of the camp and attacked the enemy advance guard and captured some elephants which were left behind. This success brought him to the plain, where he could engage Pyrrhus in battle on level ground. He routed some of the enemy lines, but an elephant charge drove him back to his camp. He called on the camp guards who were standing on the parapets of the rampart. They came down and threw javelins at the elephants, forcing them to turn round. They ran through the ranks of Pyrrhus which were thrown into disarray and, as a result, the Romans caused the Epirotes to retreat.

Dionysius of Halicarnassus wrote only briefly about the battle: "When Pyrrhus and those with him had ascended along with the elephants, and the Romans became aware of it, they wounded an elephant [calf], which caused great confusion and flight among the Greeks. The Romans killed two elephants, and hemming eight others in a place that had no outlet, took them alive when the Indian mahouts surrendered them; and they wrought great slaughter among the soldiers."

Cassius Dio also related the story of the wounded calf. He wrote that Pyrrhus was put to flight because "a young elephant had been wounded, and shaking off its riders, wandered about in search of its mother, whereupon the latter became excited and the other elephants grew turbulent, so that everything was thrown into dire confusion. Finally, the Romans won the day, killing many men and capturing eight elephants, and they occupied the enemy's entrenchments."

Modern historians have debated whether Pyrrhus actually lost the battle: some have argued that it was a draw. Draw or loss, it was no great victory for Rome: Pyrrhus still commanded a substantial force, but was forced onto the defensive.

By this time, Pyrrhus' financial resources were strained, something evident in surviving coinage from Magna Graecia. Pyrrhus may have sought support from Antigonus II Gonatas of Macedonia. If he did, it was evidently refused. Pyrrhus, seeing that his control of southern Italy was failing, decided to return home. Exactly when he did so is not clear, though autumn 275 and early 274 have been suggested. He took some 8,000 men and 500 horse, which was the core of the army with which he had landed in Sicily.

== Aftermath ==
There is no information about the number of troops deployed by either side or the number of casualties. After this defeat Pyrrhus went back to Tarentum and gave up the war. Pyrrhus kept Tarentum, left there a strong garrison under his son Helenus and Milon and sailed back to Epirus with 8,000 infantry and 500 cavalry. In 272 BC, upon hearing the news of Pyrrhus's death, the Tarentines surrendered to Rome.

At the time of the battle, this city still had its original name: Maleventum. Six years later (268 BC) the Romans sought to further secure the city and its area by establishing a Roman colony there. The name was changed from Maleventum, a name which the Romans associated with bad omens, as it means ill-come in Latin, to Beneventum, a name, meaning welcome in Latin, which to them had more fortunate connotations.
