= Siege of Syracuse (278 BC) =

Part of Sicilian wars with Carthage

- Part of the Sicilian Wars and the Pyrrhic War
Date	278 BC
Location	Syracuse, Sicily, Italy
Result	Epirote and Syracusan victory

Belligerents
Carthage	Syracuse; Epirus

Commanders and leaders
Unknown	Pyrrhos I Thoenon; Sostratos

Strength
50,000 land troops 100 ships	20,000 land troops 140 ships

The siege of Syracuse in 278 BC was the last attempt of Carthage to conquer the city of Syracuse. Syracuse was weakened by a civil war between Thoenon and Sostratus. The Carthaginians used this opportunity to attack and besiege Syracuse both by land and sea. Thoenon and Sostratus then appealed to king Pyrrhus of Epirus to come to the aid of Syracuse. When Pyrrhus arrived, the Carthaginian army and navy retreated without a fight.

== Carthage attacks a divided Syracuse ==
Hicetas, the tyrant of Syracuse, was removed from power by Thoenon. Thoenon was then challenged for power of Syracuse by Sostratus. Sostratus captured the part of Syracuse on the Sicilian mainland while Thoenon held on to the part of the city on the island of Ortygia.

When the two factions in Syracuse were exhausted by their war, the Carthaginians exploited the situation and besieged the city by land and sea. They blockaded the Great Harbour with a hundred ships and besieged the walls with 50,000 men, while they looted the territory around the city. Both of the warring factions in Syracuse asked Pyrrhus of Epirus to provide assistance. They expected Pyrrhus to help because his wife Lanassa was the daughter of Agathocles, a former tyrant of Syracuse.

== Pyrrhus arrives to relieve Syracuse ==
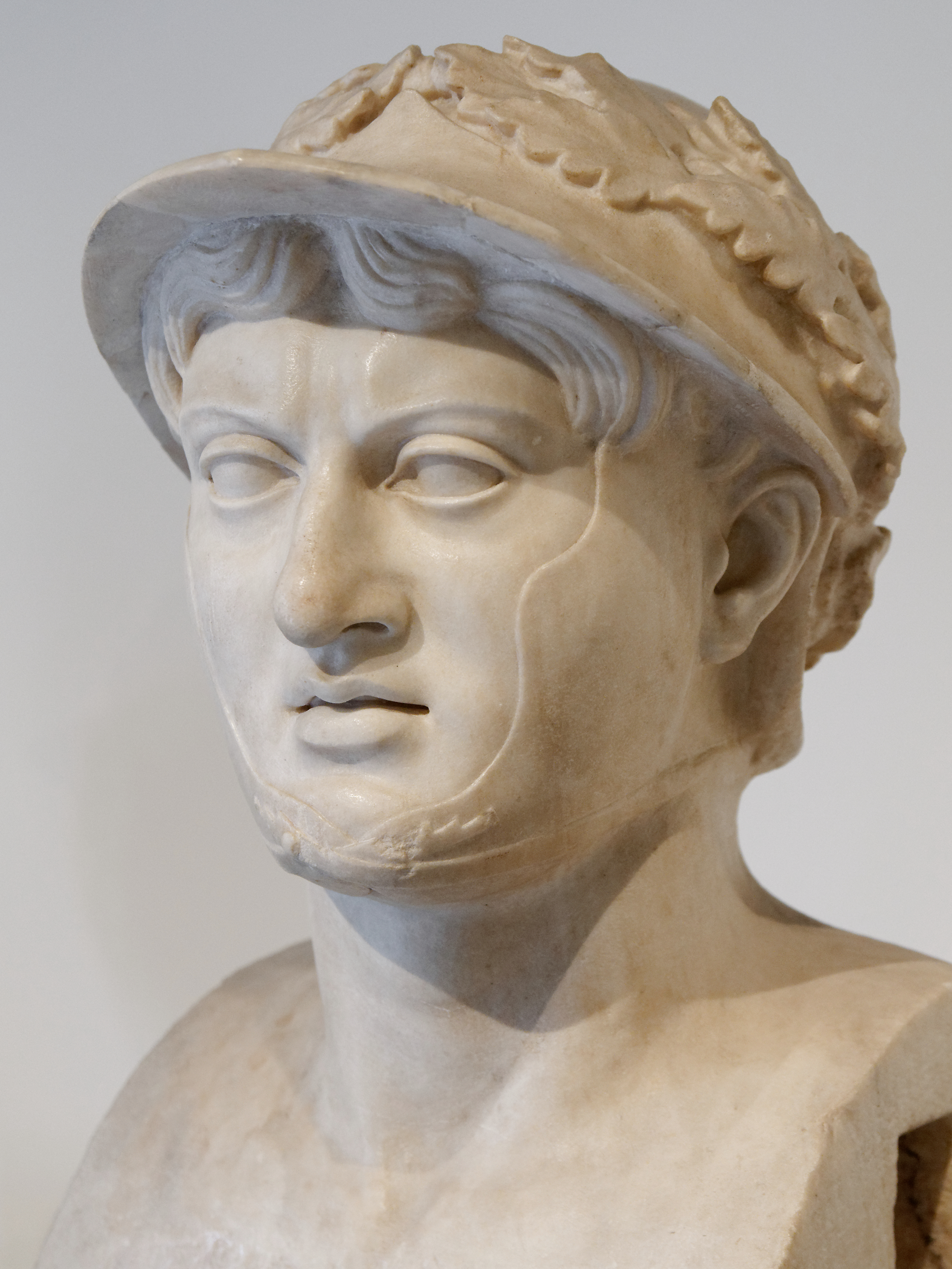
Marble bust of Pyrrhus from the Villa of the Papyri in Herculaneum, now in the National Archaeological Museum of Naples

Pyrrhus, who was waging war on the Roman Republic in Southern Italy at the time, accepted. The reputation of Pyrrhus as liberator of the Greeks from barbarian threats would have been damaged if Syracuse were to be conquered by Carthage. Also, Sicily offered the opportunity for a possible invasion of Libya, like Agathocles had done before him.

Pyrrhus arrived at Sicily early in 278 BC. When he landed on Sicily he made an alliance with Tyndarion, the ruler of Tauromenium. After receiving soldiers from that city, he continued to Catana where he disembarked his infantry. While he moved his army and fleet to Syracuse, the Carthaginians had sent thirty of their ships away on other missions. The remaining fleet and army retreated and Pyrrhus entered Syracuse unopposed. After Thoenon and Sostratus delivered the city to him, he reconciled them.

== Aftermath ==
Pyrrhus added the fleet of Syracuse to his own fleet. Syracuse possessed over 120 decked ships, 20 without decks and a royal enneres, increasing his fleet to more than 200 ships. Heracleides, the ruler of Leontini delivered his city and army of 4,000 infantry and 500 cavalry to him as well. After receiving many other Sicilian cities in alliance, he hoped he might even conquer Libya.

Pyrrhus refused Carthaginian pleas for peace and attacked their territory on Sicily. He reduced their territory to Lilybaeum, their last stronghold on western Sicily. Pyrrhus laid siege to Lilybaeum, but was not able to take it because Carthage still controlled the sea and supplied the city well. He lifted the siege and started preparations to invade Libya with his fleet.

By this time he was despised by the Sicilian Greeks for his authoritarian behavior. The last straw for the Sicilian Greeks was his execution of Thoenon. Even though Thoenon and Sostratus cooperated with Pyrrhus, he did not trust them. When Sostratus no longer felt safe and fled, he accused Thoenon of conspiring with Sostratus and had him killed. The Sicilian Greeks became hostile to him, with some cities allying themselves with the Carthaginians and the Mamertines. At this point he decided to return to Southern Italy to support the Samnites and Tarentines, who were losing the war with the Roman Republic.

== Sources ==
- Diodorus Siculus (1957). Walton, Francis R. (ed.). Library of History. Vol. 11. Cambridge, Massachusetts: Harvard University Press. ISBN 978-0-674-99450-8.
- Franke, P. R. (1989). "Pyrrhus". In Walbank, Frank W. (ed.). The Cambridge Ancient History. Vol. 7, part 2. Cambridge, United Kingdom: Cambridge University Press. ISBN 978-0-521-23446-7.
- Plutarch (1920). "Life of Pyrrhus". In Perrin, Bernadotte (ed.). Lives. Vol. 9. Cambridge, Massachusetts: Harvard University Press. ISBN 978-0-674-9-9112-5.
