= Phthia of Epirus =

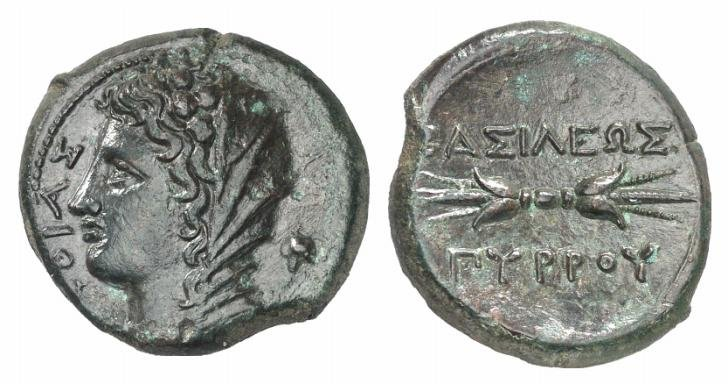
Coin of Pyrrhus, 278 BC, depicting Phtia. Obverse: Veiled head of Phtia with oak wreath, ΦΘΙΑΣ (of Phtia). Reverse: Thunderbolt, ΒΑΣΙΛΕΩΣ ΠΥΡΡΟΥ (of King Pyrrhus).

Phthia (Ancient Greek: Φθία; lived 4th century BCE), was a Greek queen, daughter of Menon of Pharsalus, the Thessalian hipparch, and wife of Aeacides, king of Epirus, by whom she became the mother of the celebrated Pyrrhus, as well as of two daughters: Deidamia, the wife of Demetrius Poliorcetes, and Troias, of whom nothing more is known.

Her portrait is found on some of the coins of her son Pyrrhus.

Another bearer of the name was her great-granddaughter, Phthia of Macedon.
