= Pyrrhic War =

War fought by Pyrrhus of Epirus in Italy and Sicily against Rome and Carthage

- Part of the Roman expansion in Italy
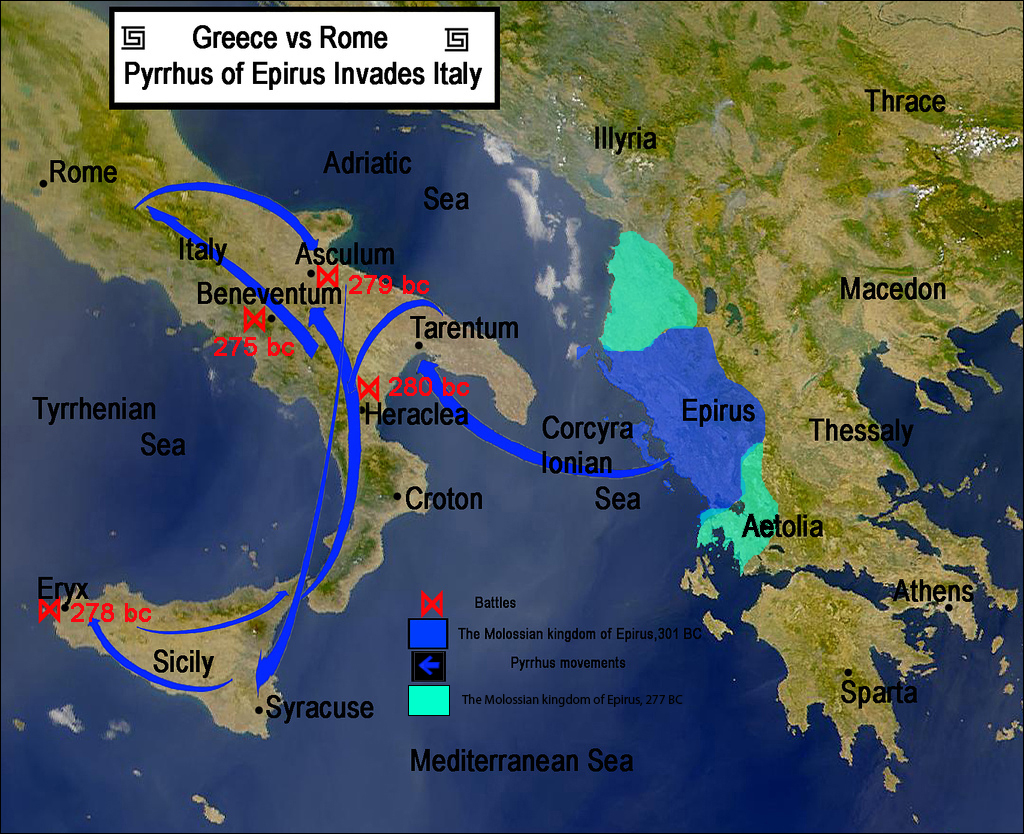
- The route of Pyrrhus of Epirus during his campaigns in southern Italy and Sicily.
Date	281–275 BC
Location	Southern Italy, Sicily
Result	Carthago-Roman victory

Belligerents
Epirus; Tarentum (and other Italiote Greeks); Syracuse (from 278)	Roman Republic; Carthage (from 278)

Commanders and leaders
Pyrrhus of Epirus	Publius Valerius Laevinus; Publius Sulpicius Saverrio; Publius Decius Mus; Manius Curius Dentatus

The Pyrrhic War (/ˈpɪrɪk/ PIRR-ik; 281–275 BC) was a conflict fought by Pyrrhus of Epirus and his allies against the Roman Republic, supported by its allies, and Carthage. Fought mainly in Magna Graecia and Sicily, Pyrrhus first intervened at the invitation of the Italiote Greeks against Roman expansion. However, his aims in the war became oriented towards establishing hegemony over southern Italy and Sicily. Initially meeting some success, his aims were left unfulfilled after his campaign in Sicily stalemated against Carthaginian resistance and Rome forced his withdrawal from Italy in 275 BC. The first major conflict involving Rome and one of the Hellenistic powers.

Prior to the war, the Romans had expanded for some decades into southern Italy, defeating most notably the Samnites. They also started to conclude alliances with the Greek city-states of Magna Graecia. The outbreak of a new conflict between one of those allies, Thurii, and a Samnite-led alliance led to Roman intervention. Tarentum, seeking to prevent continued Roman intervention in southern Italy, attacked a Roman fleet sailing in their waters contrary to a previous treaty and marched on Thurii, deposing the pro-Roman government there. After rejection of a Roman ultimatum in early 281 BC, war was declared. Cognisant of their weakness in the field, the Tarentines sought foreign support in the form of Pyrrhus of Epirus, who landed at Tarentum with reinforcements in the winter of 281/80 BC.

Pyrrhus advanced north, defeating the Romans at Heraclea in Lucania and causing some Roman allies to defect. He advanced quickly into Latium with interest in supporting the Etruscans against Rome. However, after the Romans concluded victory in Etruria, Pyrrhus withdrew from Latium for winter quarters. Over the winter, the Romans refused negotiations for a peace and reengaged Pyrrhus at Asculum in 279 BC, where the Romans were again defeated. In the aftermath of Pyrrhus' victory, however, he is said to have exclaimed "Another such victory and we are lost!" due to the losses incurred, giving rise to the modern phrase "Pyrrhic victory". With the Romans displaced from southern Italy, Pyrrhus moved into Sicily to intervene in favour of Syracuse against Carthage.

Successful on much of the island, Pyrrhus was however unable to take the Carthaginian stronghold of Lilybaeum due to weakness at sea. With renewed Roman aggression in southern Italy between 279 and 276 BC and dwindling support among the Sicilians due to the costs of the war, Pyrrhus heeded a renewed Tarentine call for aid and returned to southern Italy with some losses in early 276. In 275 BC he engaged the Romans again at Beneventum, where he was defeated or stalemated, forcing him on the defensive. With the campaign unwinnable, Pyrrhus withdrew to Epirus in the winter of 275/74, leaving a small garrison at Tarentum. While Pyrrhus' intervention had revitalised the cause of the Samnites, Lucanians, Bruttians, and Italian Greeks against Rome, the gains were short-lived. In 272, some two years after Pyrrhus' withdrawal, Tarentum fell to the Romans with the Epirote garrison given free passage home. That year Pyrrhus, campaigning in a different war in the Peloponnese, also met his end at Argos. Roman prestige on the pan-Mediterranean stage was greatly enhanced and its status as the dominant power on peninsular Italy would again be challenged only at the end of the century during the Hannibalic War.

== Sources ==
Ancient historians wrote on the war in two broad traditions, one Roman and one Greek. The older Greek tradition focused primarily on Pyrrhus and Magna Graecia. Hieronymus of Cardia, a contemporary of Pyrrhus, wrote a history focusing on the king relying on first-hand testimony and Pyrrhus' memoirs, which do not survive but was a main source for Plutarch's Life of Pyrrhus. Other Greek historians such as Timaeus and Diodorus Siculus focused more on events in Magna Graecia, with Diodorus' account relying mainly on Timaeus' history, which has also since been lost. The Roman tradition, which started only to be recorded at the end of the 200s BC, more than half a century after the Pyrrhic War, provides the core of the received narrative of the war with Pyrrhus as a valorous and honourable enemy. Starting with the poet Ennius in the first years of the 3rd century BC, and transmitted through Livy, Pompeius Trogus, and Cassius Dio from the 1st century BC onwards, the relevant portions of these works are also largely lost, with what remains surviving only as fragments or via latter-day summaries.

The only overarching narrative of the war is Plutarch's Life of Pyrrhus, which was written around AD 100 as a moralising biography to explore Pyrrhus' character. Plutarch, problematically, tends to streamline or omit historical events to better fit his narrative. For some areas and periods, the sources reduce to one: for example, for events in Italy from 278–276 BC (corresponding to Pyrrhus' Sicilian campaigns) the only source is Zonaras' medieval epitome (summary) of Dio. On the whole, the sources for the war describe events centuries before they were written – most date to the 1st century BC, with some like Zonaras to the 12th century AD (some 1,400 years later), – and are further incomplete and fragmentary in nature.

The surviving sources can also be vague and infused with mythological elements, suggesting that the authors of the sources had few authentic details available. It was also characteristic of Roman historians to introduce implausible anecdotes that sought to depict Rome favourably. The later Roman sources are also somewhat sheepish about admitting Roman defeats, seeking to downplay defeats or, in some versions, simply to assert victory. This means that many of the sources available in modern times can be less than credible and of use only alongside archaeological and other evidence.

== Outbreak ==
In the years prior to the Pyrrhic War, the Romans had steadily expanded south down the Italian peninsula. The Samnites were defeated in the Third Samnite War (298–290 BC) along with their Italic allies. The Greek city of Thurii allied itself to Rome in 285 BC seeking protection from an invasion by Lucanians and a few years later, in 282, the city fell under siege by an allied force of Samnites, Lucanians, and Bruttians. A Roman army under the command of consul Gaius Fabricius Luscinus relived the city and probably followed up with an offensive into Samnium and Lucania with little successful opposition.

The Roman alliance with Thurii, along with the demonstrable Roman ability to operate deep in southern Italy, was highly concerning to the Greek city of Taras (later called Tarentum; modern Taranto). They had aligned themselves with the Lucanians to oppose Roman expansion, which now encroached into Tarentum's sphere of influence. The Thurian alliance with Rome not only challenged Tarentine leadership of the Greek cities of southern Italy but also encircled Taras itself with pro-Roman allies and colonies. Logistical demands also saw the Romans operate a fleet in the Gulf of Taranto to support a new Roman garrison at Thurii; such a fleet was possibly in contravention of a putative treaty between Rome and Taras signed probably some fifty years earlier restricting Romans from sailing past the Lacinian promontory. Regardless, the Romans' expansion into Tarentum's sphere of influence, along with the appearance of Roman warships in Tarentine waters, was threatening to Tarentine regional interests but also its democratic regime, which feared Roman intervention overthrowing its democracy for a pro-Roman oligarchy.

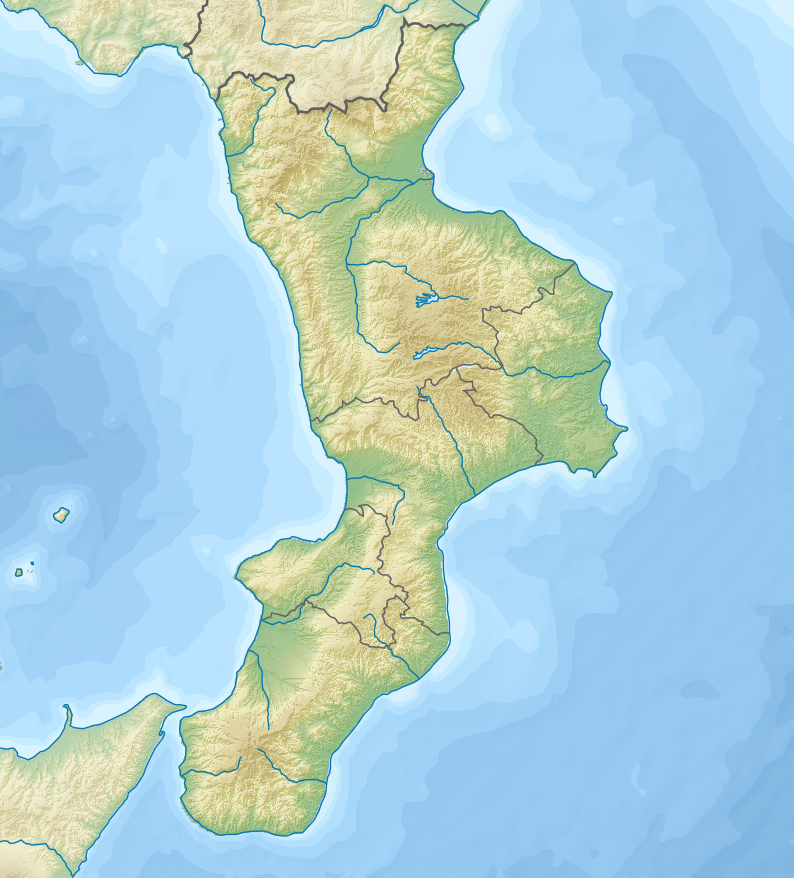
The Lacinian promontory on a modern map of Calabria. The Romans would have controlled the western coast of what is now the Calabrian peninsula, with Tarentines asserting influence over the eastern side.

The inciting incident for the war was a Tarentine attack led by the politician Philocharis on a small Roman fleet of ten ships in Tarentum's harbour, probably late in 282 BC after the consul Fabricius had departed southern Italy with his men. Taras at the same time attacked the Roman ally Thurii and drove its pro-Roman government into exile, likely with the aid of pro-Tarentine supporters within the city. The attack resulted in a Roman ultimatum to the Tarentines, delivered early in 281 by Lucius Postumius Megellus, demanding the return of prisoners taken from the Roman fleet, the return of the pro-Roman Thruian exiles, the return of property taken in the sack of the city, and the surrender of the Tarentines responsible for the attacks. These Roman demands were extreme, especially relating to the surrender of Tarentine citizens, and the Tarentines refused (in Roman sources amid a stream of insults); the ultimatum rejected, the Romans declared war.

== Course of the war ==
An army under the Roman consul Lucius Aemilius Barbula then invaded Tarentine territory directly, reiterating Roman demands while ravaging the countryside. The Tarentines, realising their own military weakness – even with the support of the Samnites, Lucanians, and Bruttians already fighting Rome – debated whether to accept Aemilius' demands or seek foreign assistance. The only viable source of substantial aid was Pyrrhus, king of Epirus (though he called himself king of the Molossians), whose reputation as a capable commander was already established across the Hellenistic world. Following internal deliberation in which the pro-Roman faction was outvoted, an invitation was extended. Recourse to foreign assistance was consistent with prior Tarentine policy, though historical precedent offered mixed results. The recent death of Agathocles of Syracuse, who had intervened for Tarentum in the past, further narrowed their options.

Aemilius learnt of the invitation quickly. His raiding of Tarentine territory continued apace but he also spared Tarentine citizens to signal Roman willingness to come to terms. Successful diplomatic missions also led to the Romans taking allies from Tarentum in the form of Locri, Croton, and Rhegium. Aemilius' campaign led to a change in Tarentine policy with the election of a new general, Agis, who sought to end the conflict as quickly as possible. Pyrrhus' aims were likely to establish a hegemony over Magna Graecia – claims in later Roman sources such as Plutarch that he sought to invade Rome and most of the western Mediterranean are exaggerated – and, after hearing of the invitation, he concluded a peace on favourable terms with Macedon so to freely turn west. Late in 281 BC, Epirote troops landed in Tarentum, removing pro-Roman politicians from the city such as Agis and causing Aemilius to withdraw to back to the Roman colony at Venusia for the winter. Amid claims from Tarentum and the Italic peoples threatened by Rome that they would raise some 350,000 soldiers with 20,000 cavalry to support Pyrrhus, the Epirote League conducted a levy ostensibly to free the southern Italian Greeks from Roman hegemony. Early in 280, Pyrrhus received a favourable oracle at Dodona, crossed the Adriatic, and was named supreme commander (strategos autocrator) of allied forces.

=== Campaign against the Romans (280–279 BC) ===
Major locations in Pyrrhus' campaign over 280–79 BC on a modern relief map of Italy

In 280 BC, the consul Publius Valerius Laevinus was assigned command of the southern theatre, while his colleague Tiberius Coruncanius advanced north to continue the war against the Etruscans. Aemilius, consul for the previous year, was prorogued, keeping forces at Venusia to contain Samnite activity. Rome also moved to secure its military position by arresting anti-Roman leaders in allied cities and reinforcing their garrisons to protect supply lines into southern Italy.

==== Heraclea ====
Marching south with probably a standard consular army, Laevinius met Pyrrhus near Heraclea with rough numerical parity. No precise numbers are given for the size of the armies, but later sources exaggerate the size of the Roman's army to cast Pyrrhus as an Alexandrine military genius and to further embellish the eventual Roman victory. Patrick Kent, in A History of the Pyrrhic War, places both armies at slightly more than 20,000 men each. Seeking a delay, Pyrrhus attempted to engage in negotiations and proposed that he serve to mediate between Tarentum and Rome. The proposal was declined.

Details of the battle are not very trustworthy. Laevinius taking the initiative, had his men ford the river Siris and attack Pyrrhus' forces. While the Roman infantry was thrown into some disorder by a contested crossing, Roman cavalry was able to ford the river at a more favourable location, probably upstream. The main Roman infantry force engaged Pyrrhus' phalanx but was unable to break through. The Roman cavalry which had forded elsewhere may have attempted a flanking manoeuvre before being thrown back by Pyrrhus' war elephants. With an advantage in mobile forces, the Roman infantry was then likely flanked and pushed into rout. The Roman sources also include a dramatic scene where one Frentani cavalry officer named Oblacus Volsinius attempted a personal charge against Pyrrhus himself in an attempt to end the war before being felled by the king's bodyguards. The sources claim that after the charge, Pyrrhus swapped his royal armour with one of his companions before being forced to expose himself again when that companion fell and his men started to waver. It is unlikely the scene is historical.

Roman casualties on the field are also not clear. Many sources suggest that the Romans took heavy casualties while Pyrrhus had lost many of his best men. Pyrrhus, however, is reported to have cautioned against too eager a pursuit, since that would encourage the enemy to fight harder. His conduct reflected the political objective to secure a rapid settlement. In subsequent talks he released Roman prisoners to cultivate goodwill, a choice aligned with this aim. The Romans then withdrew to Venusia. Pyrrhus' victory also triggered some of Rome's allies to defect. When Pyrrhus appeared at Locri, the city threw open its gates and handed over its small Roman garrison of around 200 men. Attempts at Rhegium, however, to throw out the Roman garrison were suppressed by force.

==== Asculum ====
Pyrrhus marched north from Heraclea. Laevinius continued the retreat, moving from Venusia back to Capua before Pyrrhus' Samnite allies closed Roman lines of communication across the Apennines. Lacking siege equipment, Pyrrhus was unable to take Naples or Capua, which Laevinius had reinforced with troops quickly levied from Rome. He instead bypassed the cities and continued north into Latium along the Via Latina. He likely made it as far as Anagnia or possibly even Praeneste (the towns are respectively 38 and 20 miles southeast of Rome) before turning back when the other consul, Coruncanius, having defeated the Volsinii and Vulci in Etruria – precluding Etruscan support – redeployed south to defend Rome. Laevinius allowed Pyrrhus to leave Latium, not yet feeling confident in the disposition of his forces.

Peace negotiations resumed over the winter of 280/79 BC. According to a Livian tradition, three ex-consuls were dispatched to Pyrrhus wintering at Tarentum to seek the return of Roman prisoners. Impressed by one of the consulars, Gaius Fabricius Luscinus, he had all the prisoners released and escorted to Rome by his envoy, Cineas. This envoy took the opportunity to present the Senate with terms: Rome would recognise the freedom of the southern Italian Greeks; give up all of its conquests in Samnium, Lucania, and Brutium; and conclude a bilateral alliance between Rome and Pyrrhus personally (rather than his kingdom). The tradition reports that the Senate was on the cusp of agreeing to the proposals – especially after Cineas went around to various senators with gifts, which later Romans labelled as bribes and insisted were rejected, – when the blind and aged former censor Appius Claudius Caecus spoke resolutely against it and, according to the story, carried the house. More plausibly, the Senate weighed the terms but judged them unacceptable due to the potential impact on Rome's prestige and strategic position in Italy. To bolster Roman morale, triumphs were also declared that winter for Coruncanius over the Etruscans and proconsul Aemilius over the Tarentines and Samnites.

The campaigning season for 279 BC saw both Roman consuls, Publius Sulpicius Saverrio and Publius Decius Mus, assigned to the fight against Pyrrhus with some 40,000 men (about half Romans and half allies). Pyrrhus faced this force again on roughly equal terms, centred on his 16,000 phalangites including Macedonians and with an advantage in cavalry. Ancient narratives of the battle concentrate on a supposed devotio which the consul Decius was to perform. The ritual involved Decius sacrificing himself – as his father and grandfather had at the battles of Sentinum and Veseris in 295 and 340 BC – to chthonic deities in exchange for victory. It is said that Pyrrhus, when hearing of the fear that this ritual evoked in his men, ordered them to ensure that Decius be captured alive. The episode is however almost certainly unhistorical, being a product of a Roman historiographical tradition which assumed families had characteristic behavioural traits. Regardless, the testimony of Cicero and Ammianus Marcellinus that Decius died in the battle should be discounted as Dio records a Decius Mus who is likely the same man being active in 265 BC.

Two main accounts of the battle survive. Plutarch describes a two-day battle where Pyrrhus attacked the Romans on the first day over rough terrain before on the second day Pyrrhus secured flat terrain which allowed his elephantry and cavalry to defeat the Romans. Dionysius of Halicarnassus, followed by Dio and Zonaras, instead presents a single-day battle in which Roman forces break through the Epirote centre, producing an inconclusive engagement that ended in the night. Plutarch's narrative however is the more reliable. A third variant tradition, rather than marking a Epirote victory or indecision, instead reports that the Romans won; the historian Patrick Kent dismisses these claims as products of patriotic Roman historiography, attributing them to the poet Ennius and later Roman historians' biases.

It is not clear how, in Plutarch's version, Pyrrhus was able to get the Romans onto flat terrain: it is possible that Pyrrhus' poor performance on the first day caused the Romans to be overconfident or that Pyrrhus lured Romans off the rough ground they had occupied. Either way, after the battle – though sources are not even themselves unanimous as to whether the Epirotes had won – Pyrrhus probably reported that he lost 3,605 men while the Romans had lost some 6,000. Despite the victory and the Romans' greater losses, Pyrrhus is said to have exclaimed "Another such victory and we are lost!" due to the irreplaceability of his elite hoplites, which has given rise to the modern phrase Pyrrhic victory. However, scholars such as Pierre Lévêque have doubted whether Pyrrhus actually said such a phrase, attributing the phrase instead to Roman attempts to paint their defeats more positively.

=== Sicily (278–276 BC) ===
Major locations in Pyrrhus' Sicilian expedition on a modern relief map of Sicily

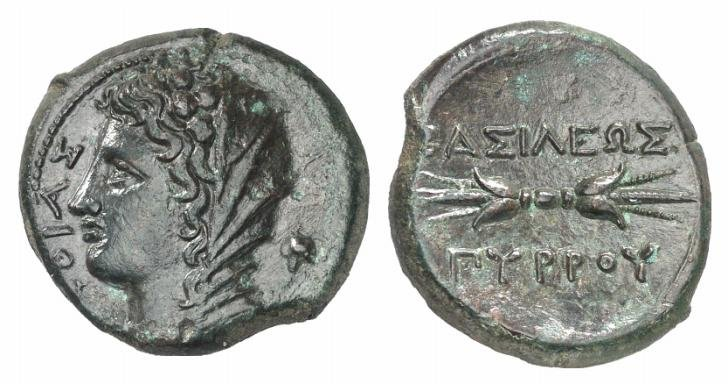
Coin of Pyrrhus minted at Syracuse in 278 BC. The obverse depicts a veiled head of Phtia with oak wreath. The reverse depicts a thunderbolt and the inscription ΒΑΣΙΛΕΩΣ ΠΥΡΡΟΥ ("of King Pyrrhus"). The claim of kingship did not necessarily imply rule over Sicily itself.

At the end of the campaign in Italy, while Pyrrhus had lost some several thousand men, he had achieved his immediate goal of displacing the Romans in peninsular Magna Graecia and establishing his own hegemony over it. Meanwhile, Carthage, expanding eastward in Sicily following the death of Agathocles of Syracuse in 289 BC, out of caution renewed its treaty of friendship with Rome. Late in the year, the Carthaginian admiral Mago arrived at Ostia at the mouth of the river Tiber with 120 ships. Rome and Carthage agreed to aid each other militarily and refrain from any separate peace.

Shortly thereafter, Pyrrhus received an invitation from Syracuse to take command of its war against Carthage. Although a Celtic threat in Macedonia presented another opportunity to seize that kingdom, he opted for Sicily, likely influenced by promises of local support and dim prospects in Macedon. The ongoing Carthaginian siege of Syracuse, if successful, would also have dealt a great blow to Pyrrhus' reputation, which was entwined with his stated war goal of freeing the western Greeks from barbarian domination. Access to Sicily was constrained by Roman and Carthaginian control of the Messine strait and the flanking ports of Rhegium and Messana. Evading the Carthaginian fleet, he crossed from Locri to Tauromenium, ruled by the tyrant Tyndarion, before advancing on Syracuse. His arrival forced the Carthaginians to abandon the siege and he entered the city in late 278 BC as a liberator. He quickly reconciled the rival Syracusan leaders Sosistratos and Theonon before buttressing his army with Sicilian allies to some 30,000 men and 2,500 horse.

At the outset of the campaigning season of 277 BC, Carthaginian forces withdrew west toward Lilybaeum, while Pyrrhus captured numerous towns in central Sicily, including the fortress at Mount Eryx on the northwestern coast. He then subdued the Mamertines in the northeast, reducing the Carthaginian position on the island to Lilybaeum and its environs. The Carthaginians, fighting defensively, were unable to do much to check Pyrrhus' advance. When Pyrrhus besieged Lilybaeum itself, they offered him money to withdraw. Declining the offer, Pyrrhus besieged Lilybaeum in autumn 277 or spring 276 but was unable to make any progress: the city was constantly resupplied by Carthage's essentially unchallenged navy and the defenders were able to repel his attempts at assault. After two months, Pyrrhus withdrew to build ships to support another attempt.

His attempts build up forces required him to assert political authority over the Sicilians. Such actions, however, alienated them. Redistributing the land that previously belonged to the tyrant Agathocles and his allies to supporters, Pyrrhus also appointed magistrates to administer justice and divert resources for his war effort. The later historian Justin claims that this was in effort to establish a permanent kingdom in Sicily for his dynasty. The Syracusan leaders who invited Pyrrhus to the island, Sosistratos and Theonon, are alleged to have conspired against Pyrrhus' attempts to make his hegemony over the island permanent; the former went into exile while the latter was executed. But with Carthaginian reinforcements arriving from Africa, defections among his Sicilian allies, and Roman advances in Italy threatening his communications along the Calabrian peninsula, Pyrrhus' position became increasingly precarious. Recognising this and fearing that his ability to withdraw by sea was closing, he heeded calls for aid from Magna Graecia and thereto withdrew.

=== Pyrrhus' return to Italy ===
While Pyrrhus was in Sicily, the Romans had not been idle: they advanced consistently against Pyrrhus' allies, their northern zone of operations in Etruria remaining quiescent. A triumph was celebrated over the Lucanians, Bruttians, Tarentines, and Samnites by Gaius Fabricius Luscinus, who was again consul in 278 BC. Moreover, the Romans reconsolidated their foothold in southern Italy, negotiating a generous treaty with Heraclea. A campaign continued under the new consuls for 277, Publius Cornelius Rufinus and Gaius Junius Bubulcus Brutus, though the details of joint operations in Samnium breaking down amid mutual recriminations reported by Zonaras are likely unreliable. The two men were successful enough – Brutus celebrated a triumph over the Lucanians and Bruttians; Rufinus took Croton and Locri – and had taken much of what is now Calabria from Pyrrhus and his allies.

Pyrrhus crossed back into peninsular Italy in early 276 BC. With the Carthaginian navy again patrolling the seas and hostile forces occupying much of Calabria, he set sail with some 110 ships. Intercepted by Carthaginian ships, he suffered some losses but was able to land at Locri. He then marched on Rhegium but was repulsed. Afterwards, as he withdrew, he was harassed by Mamertine mercenaries under their employ, and returned to Locri. Needing money, Pyrrhus had his men plunder the Locrian temple to Persephone. The sources report that ships carrying the proceeds back to Tarendum were wrecked and, after the treasure washed up on shore near Locri, Pyrrhus had them returned to plead divine forgiveness. Whether the shipwrecks or Pyrrhus' return of the sacrilegious plunder are historical is disputed.

In Rome, a plague had struck the previous year, the population was war-weary, and the omens were poor: a bolt of lightning had struck the head off a statue of Jupiter on the Capitoline, suggesting an end to Roman hegemony. The population had also fallen, if census records are to be believed, by 5.5% (from 287,222 in 280 BC to 271,224 in 275). Resistance to the levy was such that one of the consuls, Manius Curius Dentatus, threatened to sell any citizen who refused the call to arms into slavery and confiscate their property.

=== Beneventum (275 BC) ===
Dentatus' army was deployed to Beneventum, then called Maleventum, on which Pyrrhus advanced. Sources dispute how many Pyrrhus commanded. Plutarch places him at around 20,000; on the other hand, Orosius and Dionysius have him hugely outnumbering the Romans. He likely entered southern Italy with some 40,000 men in total and marched, according to modern historians, on Dentatus with some 20,000 or 25,000. The other forces sought to pin down Dentatus' co-consul, Lucius Cornelius Lentulus, in Lucania to set up the two consuls for a defeat in detail.

The sources for the battle of Beneventum are especially poor, and also tainted by a literary fixture on Pyrrhus' elephants as the cause of his own defeat. The only complete narrative is that of Plutarch. When he arrived to Beneventum, Dentatus signalled for aid from Lentulus, who may have moved quickly to his colleague. Seeking to circumvent the Roman advantage in rough terrain and force a battle before Lentulus' arrival, Pyrrhus had a detachment of his men occupy high ground behind the Roman camp. But lost in the night, they were caught in the dawn by Dentatus' forces and withdrew hastily. Buoyed by the success, Dentatus ordered an assault on Pyrrhus' army over open ground. Pyrrhus then had his elephants attack the Roman forces, driving them into disorder. After reinforcements from the Roman camp drove the elephants back with javelins, many ancient sources say that the elephants then trampled much of Pyrrhus' army underfoot, leading to their defeat. The figures reported, 23,000 or 33,000, for Pyrrhus' casualties are not reliable. Modern historians have debated whether Pyrrhus actually lost the battle: some have argued that it was a draw; Zonaras, who claims Pyrrhus fled the field with but a few horsemen, certainly exaggerates. Draw or loss, it was no great victory for Rome: Pyrrhus still commanded a substantial force, but was forced onto the defensive.

By this time, Pyrrhus' financial resources were strained, something evident in surviving coinage from Magna Graecia. Pyrrhus may have sought support from Antigonus II Gonatas of Macedonia. If he did, it was evidently refused. Pyrrhus, seeing that his control of southern Italy was failing, decided to return home. Exactly when he did so is not clear, though autumn 275 and early 274 have been suggested. He took some 8,000 men and 500 horse, which was the core of the army with which he had landed in Sicily.

== Aftermath ==
Some two or three years after Pyrrhus' withdrawal, in 272 BC, Tarentum fell to the Romans. Pyrrhus had left an Epirote garrison in the city under the command of his son Helenus and the general Milo. The Romans may have feared that attacking it while the garrison was around would draw Pyrrhus back. That year, with Carthaginian naval support, the Romans invested the city and the garrison surrendered in exchange for safe passage to Epirus. The remaining resistance to Rome among the Italiot Greeks collapsed, with the remaining cities quickly seeking terms.

272 BC was also the same year that Pyrrhus met his death. Upon his return to Epirus c. early 274, he defeated Antigonus II Gonatas and claimed the kingdom of Macedonia, leading to his invasion of the Peloponnese in the spring of 272 on the pretext of pushing one of his generals' ancestral claims. Facing Antigonus at Argos, he was able to secret his forces into the city. But amid street fighting, he was struck with a roof tile thrown by one of the civilians and died.

Pyrrhus' intervention in southern Italy temporarily revitalised the cause of the Samnites, Lucanians, and Bruttians. But the years after 275 saw renewed Roman campaigns against the three tribes, with around ten triumphs over the southern Italic tribes recorded in the Capitoline Fasti between 282 and 272 BC. Defeated by the close of the war, Roman victories in southern Italy were solidified by colonial projects in 273, 268, and 263 at Paestum, Beneventum, and Aesernia. Armed resistance to Roman rule in this area would have to wait until Hannibal's arrival during the Second Punic War.

== Legacy ==
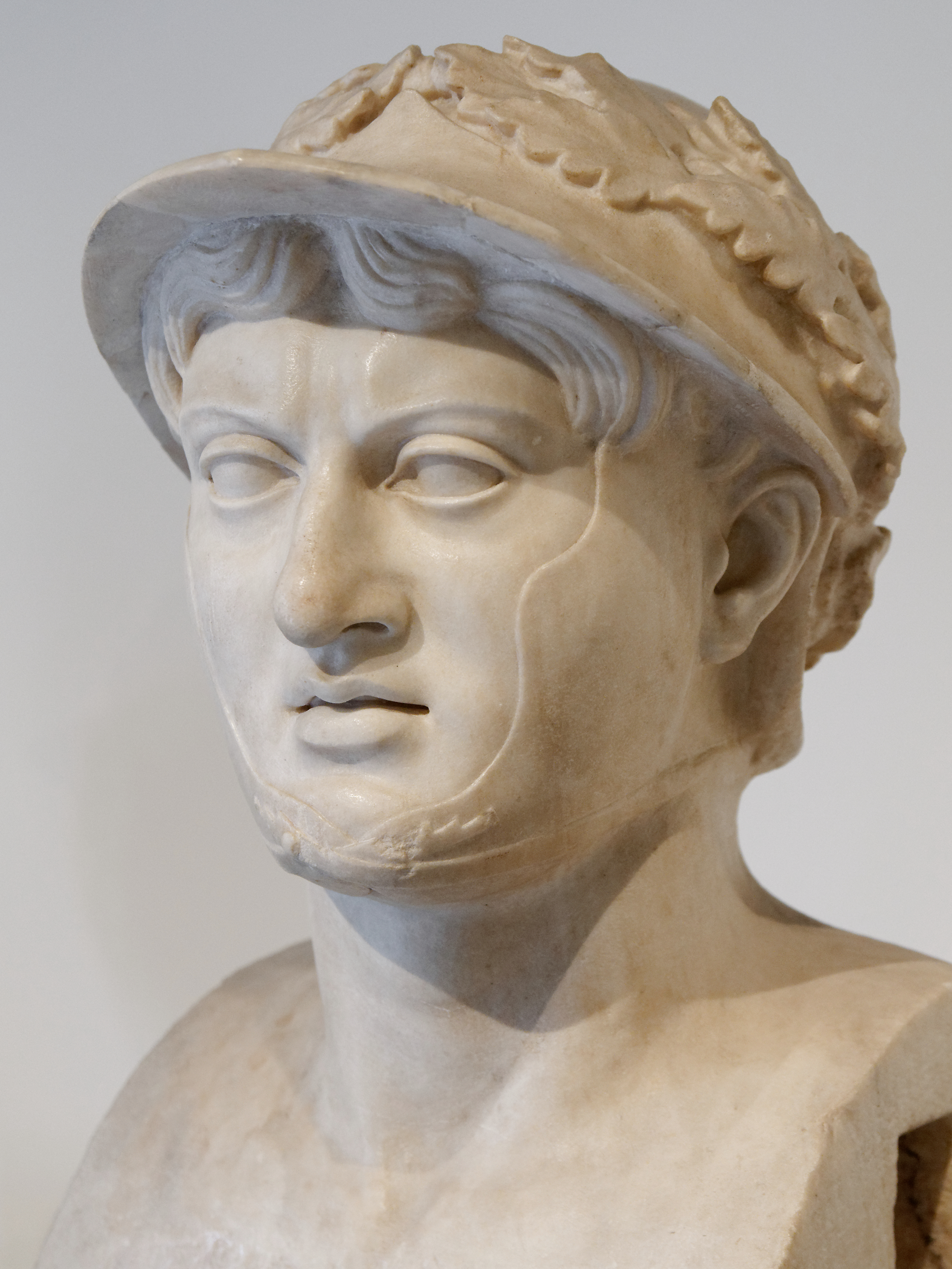
Pyrrhus, depicted on a bust found in the Villa of the Papyri at Herculaneum

In the aftermath of Roman victory over Pyrrhus, the city-state was recognised as one of the great Mediterranean powers. Indeed, its envoys were welcomed in Ptolemaic Egypt shortly thereafter in befitting splendour. Its victory over the peninsular Greeks also cemented Rome's hegemony over Italy, completing its conquest of the peninsula. This was recognised in ancient times, for example, by the historian Florus who marked it as the start of Roman pan-Mediterranean ambitions. Indeed, the emergence of these pan-Mediterranean ambitions came with a Roman unease towards eastern wealth and fears that it, with a corrupting influence, would stamp out the frugal and austere communitarian virtues of early Roman heroes.

=== Embellishment in Roman historiography ===
Pyrrhus may also have cast the war against Rome as a new Trojan War, which strengthened Rome's commitment to its legend (if not created whole-cloth around this time) of descent from Trojan exiles. The interweaving of myth into the historical importance of the war was common in ancient Romans' historical literature which infused the narrative of the war with premonitions, prophecies, and dramatic duels. When the first Roman histories were being written in the 2nd century BC, events of the war "stood on the edge of living memory", which contrasted with earlier periods documented only sparsely and partially. However, it was still sufficiently distant to be reworked into a semi-mythical tale of conflict between a new Alexander and a nascent Rome.

Some of these myths were used by later literary works as foreshadowing for the larger Punic wars that would come some decades later. The Carthaginians and Romans, in this war acting as co-belligerents, are depicted as unwilling allies who nearly came to blows due to alleged breaches of trust from the Punic side (the so-called "Punic faith"). It is likely that these narratives, written after the Punic wars, sought to distance Rome from the Carthaginians by minimising Roman contacts and concocting Punic betrayals. Parallels between the Pyrrhic and Punic wars also abound in the literary narratives: Pyrrhus and Hannibal are especially assimilated as skilled generals successfully defeating Roman armies in Italy; both were skilled tacticians who were able to peel away Roman allies; both were eventually defeated by Roman tenacity.

=== Pyrrhic victory ===
A Pyrrhic victory is a victory spoiled by the costs incurred in achieving it. The phrase references a line in Plutarch's Life of Pyrrhus where the king says "One more victory over the Romans and we are completely done for", after his victory at the second Battle of Asculum in 279 BC. Its use in English first became common was in the early 19th century, with the adjective Pyrrhic paired with "triumph" or, as in the more common pairing today, "victory".

== See also ==
- Hellenistic armies
- Punic Wars
- Macedonian Wars
