= Pyrrhus of Epirus =

King of Epirus from 297 to 272 BC

Pyrrhus
- Basileus
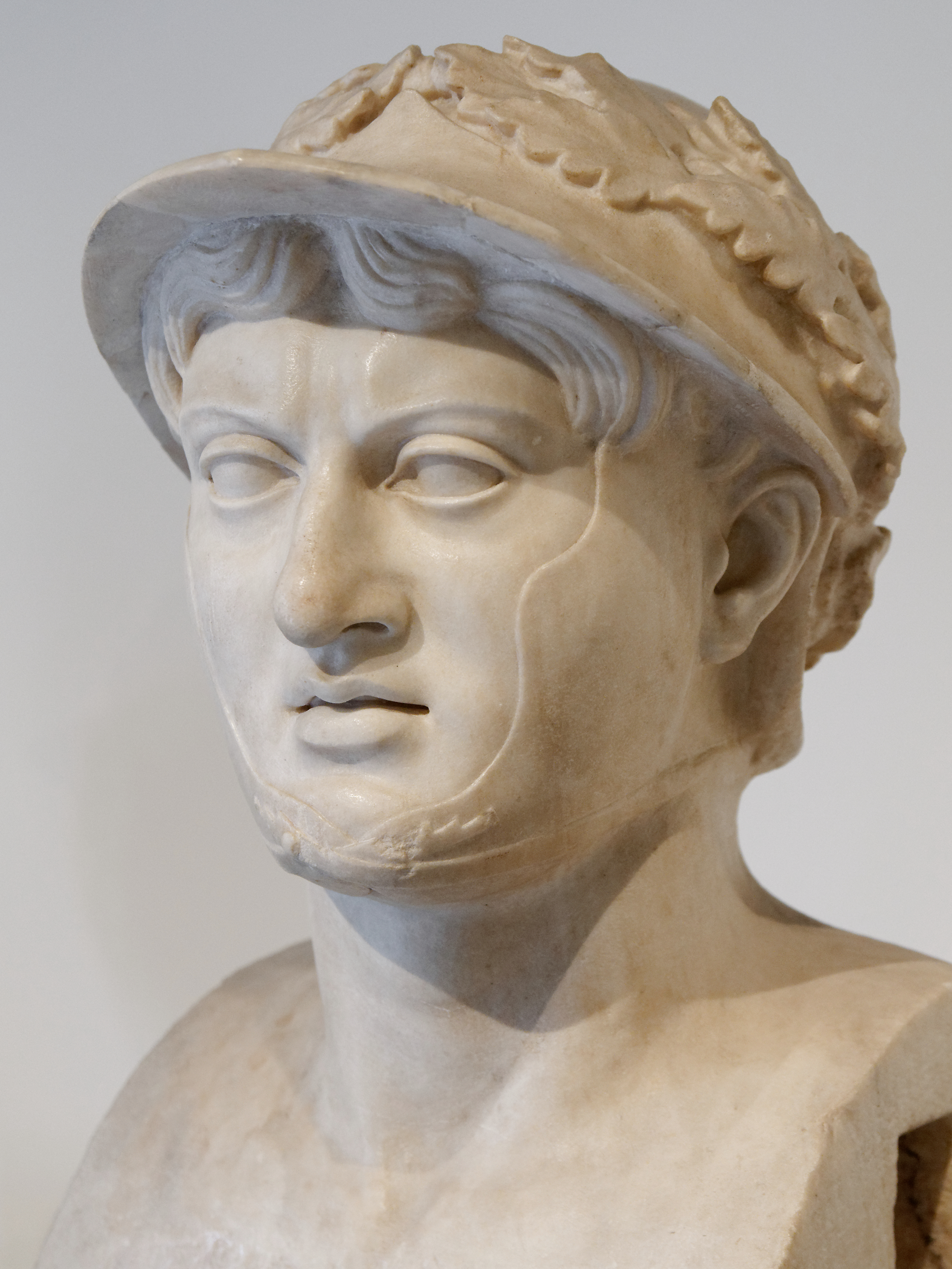
- A marble bust of Pyrrhus from the Villa of the Papyri at the Roman site of Herculaneum, now in the National Archaeological Museum of Naples, Italy

King of Epirus
- Reign: 297–272 BC (second reign)
- Predecessor: Neoptolemus II
- Successor: Alexander II
- Reign: 307–302 BC (first reign)
- Predecessor: Alcetas II
- Successor: Neoptolemus II

King of Macedon
- Reign: 274–272 BC
- Predecessor: Antigonus II
- Successor: Antigonus II
- Reign: 288–284 BC
- Predecessor: Demetrius I
- Successor: Lysimachus

Tyrant of Syracuse
- Reign: 278–276 BC
- Predecessor: Thinion & Sosistratus
- Successor: Hiero II
- Born: c. 319 BC; Epirus, Greece
- Died: 272 BC (aged about 46); Argos, Peloponnese, Greece
- Spouse: Antigone; Lanassa; Bircenna
- Issue: Olympias; Ptolemy; Alexander II; Helenus
- Dynasty: Aeacidae
- Father: Aeacides
- Mother: Phthia
- Religion: Greek paganism
- Military career
- Conflicts: Wars of the Diadochi; Fourth War of the Diadochi; Battle of Ipsus; The Struggle over Macedon; Epirote-Macedonian War of 289 BC; Battle of Aetolia; Macedonian Campaign; Siege of Athens (287 BC); The Struggle between Antigonus Gonatas and Pyrrhus of Epirus; Battle of the Aous (274 BC); Siege of Sparta; Battle of Argos †; Pyrrhic War; Battle of Heraclea; Battle of Asculum; Siege of Venusia; Battle of Rhegium; Siege of Syracuse; Battle of Eryx; Siege of Lilybaeum; Battle of the Strait of Messina; Battle of Beneventum

Pyrrhus (/ˈpɪrəs/ PIRR-əss; Ancient Greek: Πύρρος Pýrrhos; 319/318–272 BC) was a Greek king and statesman of the Hellenistic period. He was king of the Molossians, of the royal Aeacid house, and later he became king (Malalas also called him toparch) of Epirus. He was one of the strongest opponents of early Rome, and had been regarded as one of the greatest generals of antiquity. Several of his victorious battles caused him unacceptably heavy losses, from which the phrase "Pyrrhic victory" was coined.

Pyrrhus became king of Epirus in 306 BC at the age of 13, but was dethroned by Cassander four years later. He saw action during the Wars of the Diadochi and regained his throne in 297 BC with the support of Ptolemy I Soter. He co-ruled Macedon together with Lysimachus after driving out Demetrius in 288 BC. In 284 BC, he was driven out of Macedon by Lysimachus. During the eponymous Pyrrhic War of 280–275 BC, Pyrrhus fought Rome at the behest of Tarentum, scoring costly victories at Heraclea and Asculum. He proceeded to take over Sicily from Carthage, but after some initial success, he was soon driven out and returned to Italy where he lost all his gains after the Battle of Beneventum in 275 BC.

Pyrrhus seized the Macedonian throne from Antigonus II Gonatas in 274 BC and invaded the Peloponnese in 272 BC. The Epirote assault on Sparta was thwarted, however, and Pyrrhus was killed during a street battle at Argos.

== Etymology ==
The Latinized Pyrrhus derives from the Greek Pyrrhos (/ˈpɪrəs/; Greek: Πύρρος), meaning flame-like or flammable, derived from the word Pyr (/ˈpɪr/; Greek: Πύρ) meaning fire and the suffix -ros (/ˈrəs/; Greek: ρος) meaning -able or "pertaining to". According to others, the name's actual meaning is "fiery, red-coloured", and was especially used to denote red hair. Pyrrhos was also used as an alternate name for Neoptolemus, son of Achilles and the princess Deidamia in Homeric Greek mythology.

== Early life ==
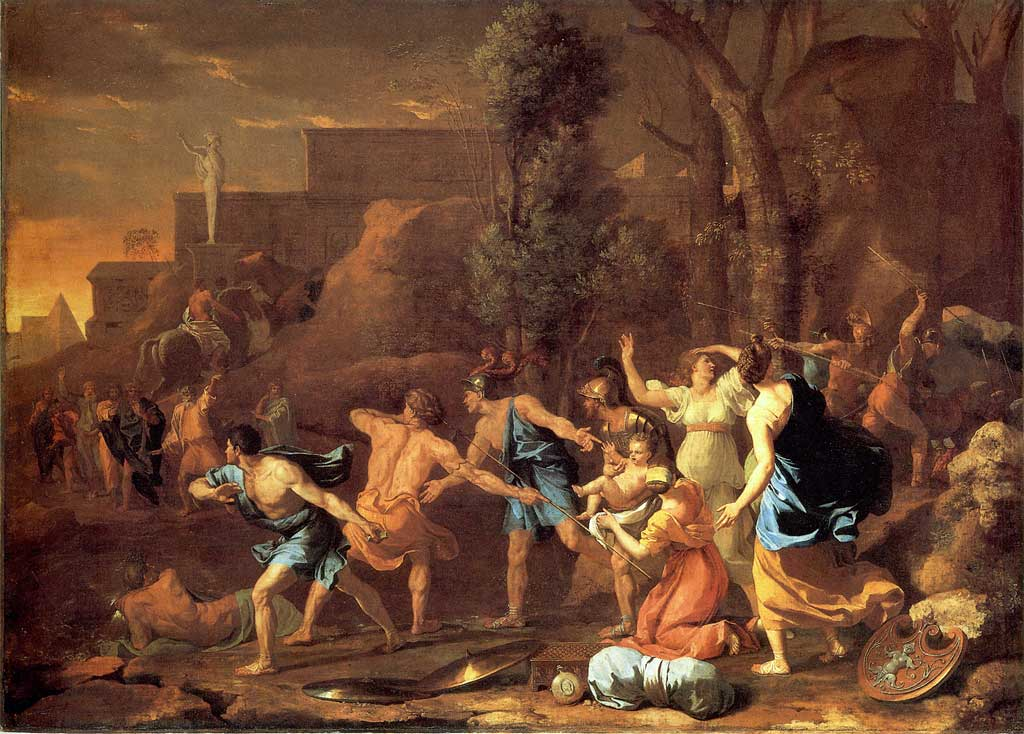
The rescue of the young Pyrrhus after an uprising against his father Aeacides of Epirus by Nicolas Poussin (ca. 1634)

In c. 319 BC, Pyrrhus was born to prince Aeacides of Epirus, and Phthia, a Thessalian noblewoman, the daughter of the Thessalian general Menon. Aeacides was a cousin of Olympias, making Pyrrhus a second cousin to Alexander the Great. He had two sisters: Deidamia and Troias. In 319/318 BC, Arrybas, Aeacides's father and the regent of Epirus, died leaving Epirus to the joint kings Aeacides and Neoptolemus.

Aeacides supported Olympias in her fight against Cassander and marched on Macedon. In 317 BC, when Pyrrhus was only two, Olympias requested Aeacides's support yet again and he marched on Macedon a second time. Many of his soldiers did not like their service and mutinied. Aeacides released these soldiers from his army, but as a result his army was too small to achieve anything. When the mutineers arrived in Epirus they caused a rebellion against their absent king and Aeacides was dethroned. Cassander sent one of his generals, Lyciscus, to act as regent to the still underaged Neoptolemus. Epirus in effect became a puppet kingdom of Cassander. Pyrrhus's family fled north and took refuge with Glaucias of the Taulantians, one of the largest Illyrian tribes. Pyrrhus was raised by Beroea, Glaucias's wife, a Molossian of the Aeacidae dynasty. Cassander marched against Glaucias, defeated his army and captured Apollonia. Glaucias had to promise not to act against Cassander, but he refused to give up Pyrrhus and his family.

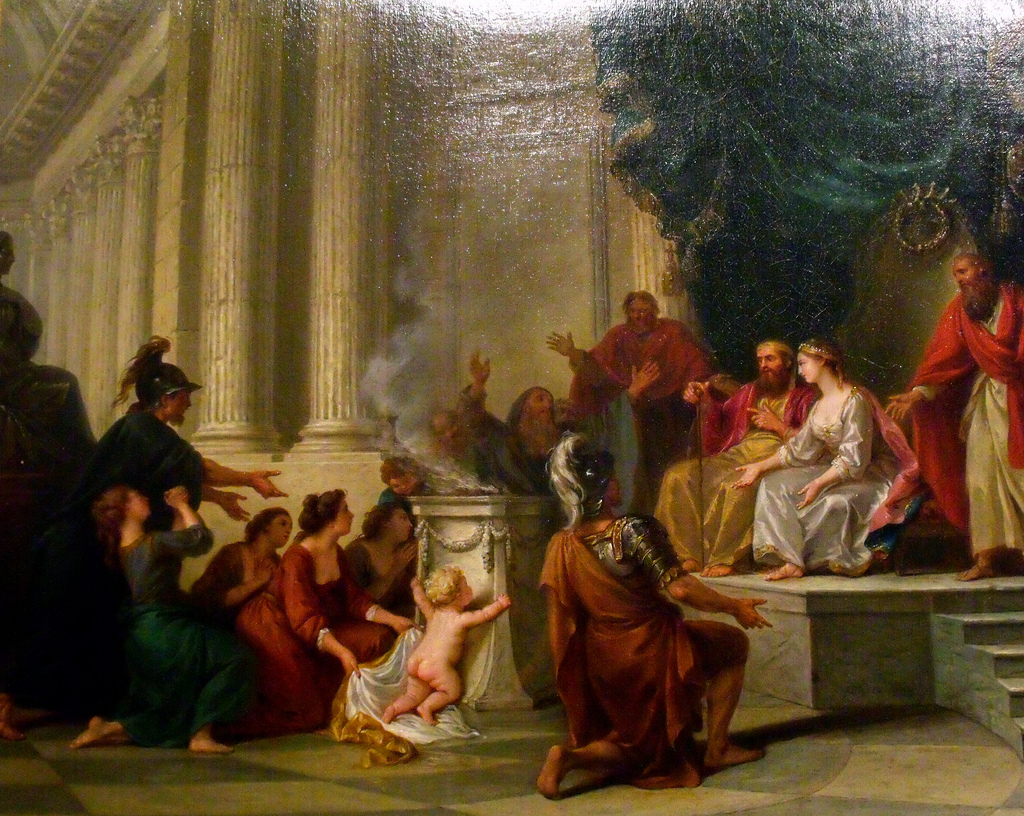
The infant Pyrrhus is presented to King Glaucias by Nicolas-René Jollain (ca. 1779)

By 313 BC, Cassander was distracted by his war against Antigonus Monophthalmus, one of the most powerful of the Diadochi. Fearing an invasion from Asia Minor, where Antigonus was building up his forces, he shifted his attention from west to the east. Aeacides took advantage of the situation and returned to Epirus. He appears to have regained popularity and raised a large army. Cassander sent an army under his brother Philip who defeated Aeacides in two battles. Aeacides was wounded in the last battle and died soon after.

Pyrrhus claimed descent from the mythological figures of Achilles and Helenus.

== First reign ==
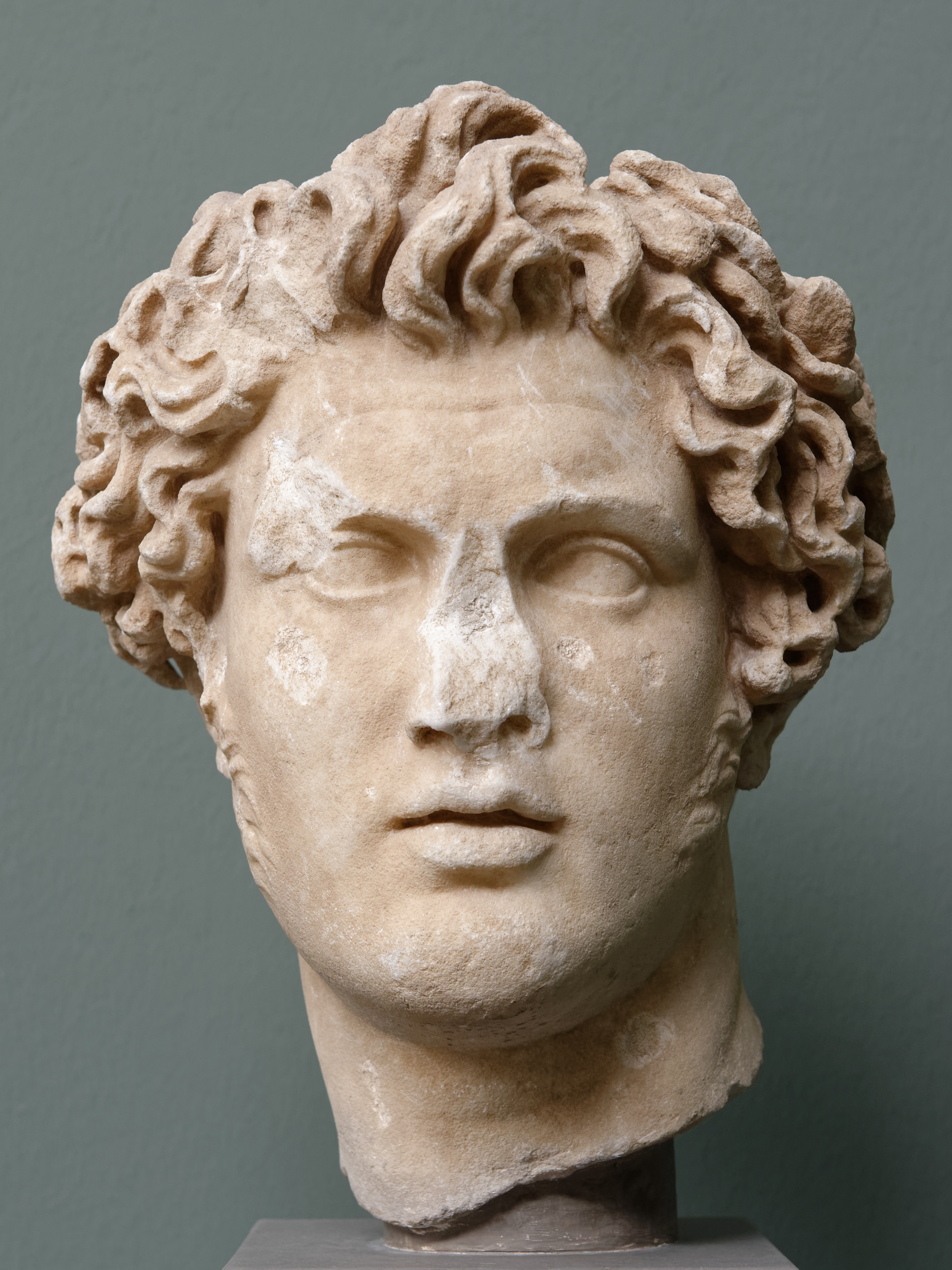
Bust of Pyrrhus of Epirus, Roman copy of Greek original inside the Ny Carlsberg Glyptotek in Copenhagen

In 307 BC, Glaucias invaded Epirus and put Pyrrhus on the throne. Pyrrhus was only eleven years old, so his guardians ruled in his stead until he came of age. When he was seventeen he travelled to the court of Glaucias in Illyria to attend the wedding of one of Glaucias's sons. While he was in Illyria the Molossians rose in rebellion, drove out Pyrrhus's supporters, and returned Neoptolemus to the throne. This time Glaucias was unable to help him.

== Exile ==
Pyrrhus travelled to the Peloponnese and served his brother-in-law Demetrius Poliorcetes who had married his sister Deidamia, and who was campaigning against Cassander in southern Greece.

=== The Battle of Ipsus ===
In 302 BC, Demetrius took his army to Asia Minor to support his father Antigonus Monophthalmus. Pyrrhus impressed Antigonus for he is reputed to have said that Pyrrhus would become the greatest general of his time, if he lived long enough.

Antigonus had grown too powerful and the other successors, Seleucus, Lysimachus, Ptolemy and Cassander, had united against him. Lysimachus and Seleucus, reinforced by two of Cassander's armies, had concentrated their forces in Asia Minor and marched on Antigonus. Both armies met at Ipsus in Phrygia. The Battle of Ipsus was the largest and most important battle of the Wars of the Successors. Pyrrhus probably fought with Demetrius on the right wing, a place of honour, and made a brilliant display of valour among the combatants. Despite these brave efforts, Antigonus lost both the battle and his life. Demetrius, victorious on his wing, managed to escape with 9,000 men, and Pyrrhus continued to serve his brother-in-law as he started rebuilding Antigonus' empire.

=== Ptolemy ===
In 298 BC, Pyrrhus was taken hostage to Alexandria, under the terms of a peace treaty made between Demetrius and Ptolemy I Soter. There, he married Ptolemy I's stepdaughter Antigone (a daughter of Berenice I of Egypt from her first husband Philip—respectively, Ptolemy I's wife and a Macedonian noble). In 297 BC, Cassander died and Ptolemy, always looking for allies, decided to help restore Pyrrhus to his kingdom. He provided Pyrrhus with men and funds and sent him back to Epirus.

== Second reign ==
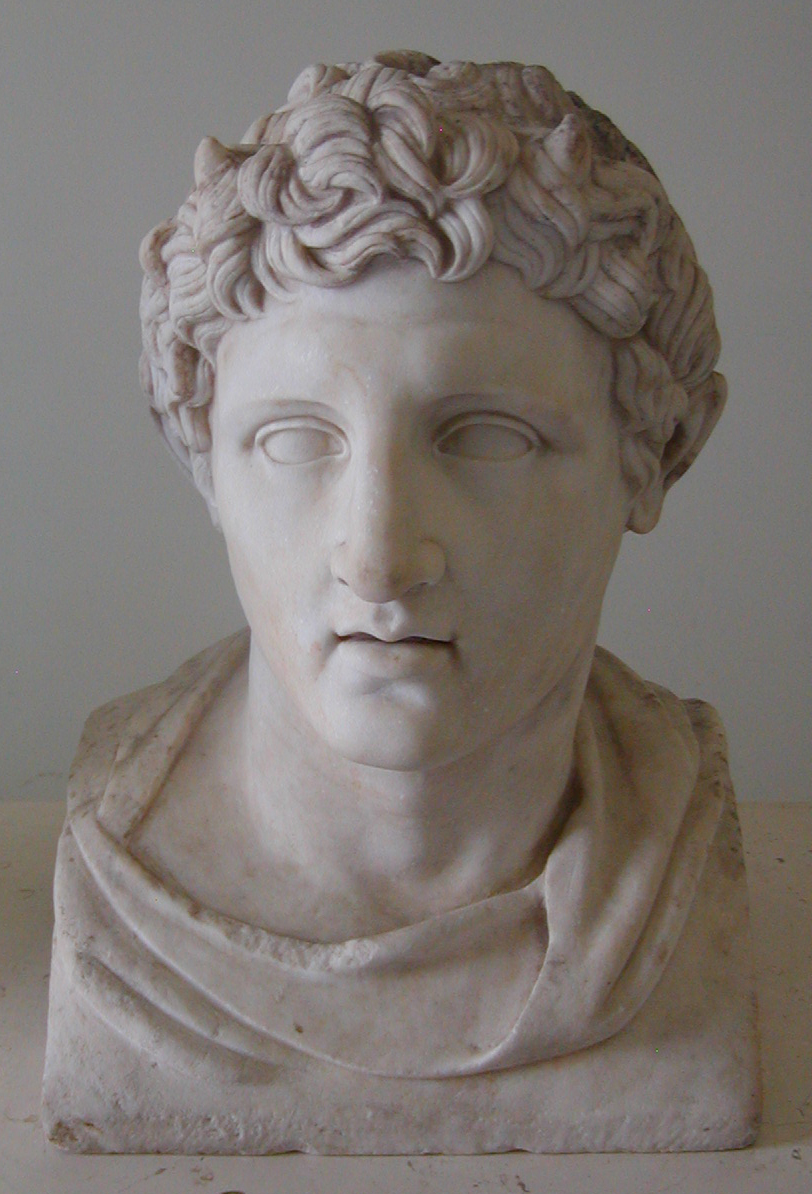
Bust of Demetrius I of Macedonia, 1st century AD Roman copy of a Greek original from the 3rd century BC

Pyrrhus returned to Epirus at the head of an army, but not willing to fight a civil war, he agreed to rule Epirus together with Neoptolemus. Soon both kings started to plot against one another. Pyrrhus was informed of a plot against his life and decided to strike first. He invited Neoptolemus to a dinner and had him murdered. The act does not appear to have been unpopular as Epirus's nobility seem to have been devoted to him.

In 295 BC, Pyrrhus transferred the capital of his kingdom to Ambracia. In 292 BC, he went to war against his former ally and brother-in-law Demetrius by invading Thessaly while Demetrius was besieging Thebes. Demetrius responded immediately; he left the siege to his son Antigonus Gonatas and marched back north at the head of a large army. Pyrrhus, outnumbered, withdrew to Epirus.

While he was back in Epirus, Pyrrhus suffered another setback. His second wife, Lanassa, daughter of the self-proclaimed king of Sicily Agathocles of Syracuse, deserted him. She claimed that she, a daughter of a Greek king, could no longer bear to share her home with barbarian women. She fled to Corcyra with her dowry, offering it and herself to Demetrius. He accepted, sailed to the island and took possession of both Corcyra and Lanassa. After returning to his army in mainland Greece, Demetrius planned to invade Epirus. In 289 BC, he invaded Pyrrhus's allies, the Aetolian League, hoping to neutralize them before he invaded Epirus. The Aetolians refused battle and retreated into the hills. After ransacking the Aetolians' countryside, Demetrius left a strong force under his best general Pantauchus in Aetolia and marched on Epirus. Meanwhile, Pyrrhus had raised his army and was marching to the rescue of his Aetolian allies. The two armies, on different roads, passed one another and Demetrius started plundering Epirus while Pyrrhus met Pantauchus in battle.

Pyrrhus had the bulk of the army of Epirus with him, probably 20,000–25,000 men, while Pantauchus commanded but a detachment of Demetrius's army consisting of around 11,000 men. The fighting was heavy, and according to the sources Pantauchus and Pyrrhus sought out one another. Pantauchus challenged Pyrrhus to individual combat, and Pyrrhus accepted. After hurling spears at each other they fought it out with swords. Pyrrhus was wounded, but in return wounded his opponent twice, in the thigh and in the neck. Pantauchus's bodyguards had to carry him away. Emboldened by their king's victory, the Epirotes resumed their attack and broke Pantauchus's army, and took 5,000 prisoners. The army then honoured Pyrrhus by bestowing the surname of 'Eagle' upon him. Demetrius, upon hearing of Pyrrhus's victory, marched back to Macedon. Pyrrhus released his prisoners and marched back to Epirus.

In 289 BC, Pyrrhus, learning that Demetrius was dangerously ill, invaded Macedonia. His original intention was merely to raid and pillage, but with Demetrius unable to lead his forces he met almost no opposition. Pyrrhus penetrated as far as the old Macedonian capital of Aegae before Demetrius was well enough to take the field. Since Demetrius commanded a superior force, Pyrrhus had no choice but to retreat.

Demetrius, just as restless as Pyrrhus, planned to invade Asia and reclaim his father's old domains. He first made peace with Pyrrhus granting him his holdings in Macedonia while holding on to Corcyra and Leucas, then he started to raise a vast army and a huge fleet. Faced with this threat, the other Diadochi Lysimachus, Ptolemy, and Seleucus allied against him. The three kings sent embassies to Pyrrhus trying to win him over to their side or at least get him to remain neutral. If the allies won and Pyrrhus remained neutral he would gain nothing. If on the other hand Demetrius would be victorious he could overwhelm Pyrrhus at any time in the future. Pyrrhus's personal enmity against Demetrius might have played an additional role in his decision to join the allies.

In 288 BC, the allied kings began their campaigns against Demetrius. Ptolemy sailed against Demetrius's Greek allies with a large fleet. Lysimachus invaded upper Macedonia from Thrace. Pyrrhus waited until Demetrius had marched against Lysimachus and then invaded southern Macedonia. Demetrius must have thought that Pyrrhus would not renege on his treaty, because western and southern Macedonia fell without opposition. Meanwhile, Demetrius had won a victory over Lysimachus near Amphipolis. When the Macedonian army heard that their homeland was being overrun by Pyrrhus, they turned on Demetrius. They were fed up with his autocratic rule and grandiose plans and refused to advance any further. Demetrius then led his army against Pyrrhus, probably hoping that his Macedonians would be more willing to fight a foreign invader rather than Lysimachus, a veteran of Alexander. Unfortunately for Demetrius, his troops were so fed up with him that they deserted to Pyrrhus and he had to flee. Lysimachus was soon joined by Pyrrhus and they decided to share rulership over Macedonia.

Demetrius gathered a new army in Greece and besieged Athens, which had rebelled against the puppet government he had installed. The Athenians called on Pyrrhus for assistance and he marched against Demetrius once more. This caused Demetrius to raise the siege. The Athenians thanked Pyrrhus by erecting a bust to him and allowing him into the city for the celebrations. However, they did not allow his army to enter the city, probably fearing Pyrrhus would install a garrison and make himself overlord of Athens. Pyrrhus made the most of the situation and advised the Athenians never to let a king enter their city again.

Pyrrhus and Demetrius made peace once more but, like all previous agreements, it did not last. When Demetrius, in 286 BC, invaded Asia in order to attack Lysimachus's Asian domains, Lysimachus requested that Pyrrhus invade Thessaly and from there attack Demetrius's garrisons in Greece. Pyrrhus agreed, probably in order to keep his fractious Macedonian troops busy and less likely to rebel and also to gain an easy victory over the weakened Antigonids. He quickly defeated Antigonus Gonatas, Demetrius's son, who ceded Thessaly to him in order to make peace. Pyrrhus's Greek Empire was now at its zenith: he ruled an enlarged Epirus, half of Macedonia, and Thessaly.

In 285 BC, Demetrius was defeated by Seleucus. This freed the hands of Lysimachus who decided to get rid of his co-ruler in Macedonia. He first isolated Pyrrhus from his traditional ally the Ptolemies, by marrying Arsinoe II, the sister of Ptolemy II Philadelphus. He also made a large donation to the Aetolians, Pyrrhus's main allies in Greece. Pyrrhus felt threatened enough to make an alliance with Antigonus Gonatas. In 284 BC, Lysimachus invaded Pyrrhus's half of Macedonia with a huge army. Unable to stand against Lysimachus's superior army Pyrrhus retreated and linked up with Antigonus Gonatas. Lysimachus started a propaganda campaign in which he appealed to the patriotism of the Macedonians serving Pyrrhus. He reminded them that Pyrrhus was in fact a foreign king while he himself was a true Macedonian. The campaign was successful. With his Macedonian troops turning against him Pyrrhus had no other choice but to withdraw to Epirus. Lysimachus invaded and plundered Epirus the following year. Pyrrhus did not oppose Lysimachus for he was probably fighting a war in Illyria to the north. According to Pausanias, "Pyrrhus was roaming around as usual".

== Struggle with Rome ==
Routes taken against Rome in the Pyrrhic War (280–275 BC)

The Greek city of Tarentum, in southern Italy, fell out with Rome due to a violation of an old treaty that specified Rome was not to send warships into the Tarentine Gulf. In 282 BC, the Romans installed garrisons in the Greek cities of Thurii (on the western end of the Tarentine Gulf), Locri, and Rhegium, and sent warships to Thurii. Although this was designed as a measure against the Italian peoples of Lucania, the Tarentines grew nervous and attacked the Romans in Thurii, driving the Roman garrison from the city and sinking several Roman warships. Tarentum was now faced with a Roman attack and certain defeat, unless they could enlist the aid of greater powers. Rome had already made itself into a major power, and was poised to subdue all the Greek cities in Magna Graecia. The Tarentines asked Pyrrhus to lead their war against the Romans. Pyrrhus was encouraged to aid the Tarentines by the Oracle of Delphi. He recognized the possibility of carving out an empire for himself in Italy. He made an alliance with Ptolemy Keraunos, King of Macedon and his most powerful neighbor, and arrived in Italy in 280 BC.

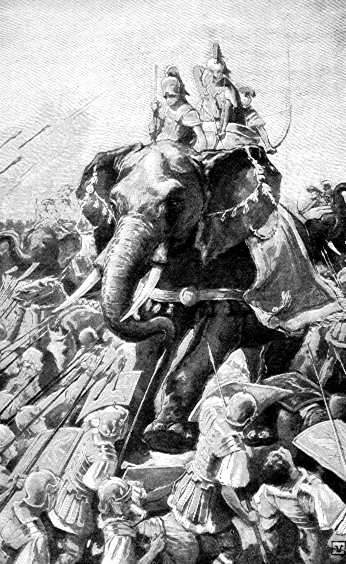
Pyrrhus and his elephants

Pyrrhus entered Italy with an army consisting of 20,000 infantry, 3,000 cavalry, 2,000 archers, 500 slingers, and 20 war elephants in a bid to subdue the Romans. The elephants had been loaned to him by Ptolemy II Philadelphus, who had also promised 9,000 soldiers and a further 50 elephants to defend Epirus while Pyrrhus and his army were away.

Due to his superior cavalry, his elephants and his deadly phalanx infantry, he defeated the Romans, led by Consul Publius Valerius Laevinus, in the Battle of Heraclea in 280 BC, in the Roman province of Lucania. There are conflicting sources about casualties. Hieronymus of Cardia reports the Romans lost about 7,000 while Pyrrhus lost 3,000 soldiers, including many of his best; Dionysius gives a bloodier view of 15,000 Roman dead and 13,000 Epirot. Several tribes, including the Lucanians, Bruttii, Messapians, and the Greek cities of Croton and Locri, joined Pyrrhus. He then offered the Romans a peace treaty which was eventually rejected. Pyrrhus tried to wrest Campania from the Romans, but was thwarted in this by the reinforced army of Laevinus. He then boldly marched on Rome itself, but found its defences too formidable. Meanwhile, the Romans had made peace with the Etruscans and had recalled Tiberius Coruncanius, the other consul, who was marching his army southwards from Etruria towards Rome. Pyrrhus now faced three armies: the garrison of Rome, Laevinus from the south, and Curuncanius from the north. Not wanting to be caught between three armies Pyrrhus withdrew to Tarentum, where he wintered his troops.

When Pyrrhus invaded Apulia (279 BC), the two armies met in the Battle of Asculum, where Pyrrhus won a costly victory. The consul Publius Decius Mus was the Roman commander, and while his able force was ultimately defeated, they almost managed to break the back of Pyrrhus's Epirot army, guaranteeing the security of Rome itself. In the end, the Romans lost 6,000 men and Pyrrhus 3,500 including many officers. Pyrrhus later famously commented on his victory at Asculum, stating: "If we are victorious in one more battle with the Romans, we shall be utterly ruined". It is from reports of this semi-legendary event that the term Pyrrhic victory originates.

== Ruler of Sicily ==
In 278 BC, Pyrrhus received two offers simultaneously. The Greek cities in Sicily asked him to come and drive out Carthage, which along with Rome was one of the two great powers of the Western Mediterranean. At the same time, the Macedonians, whose King Ptolemy Keraunos had been killed by invading Gauls, asked Pyrrhus to ascend the throne of Macedon. Pyrrhus decided that Sicily offered him a greater opportunity, and sailed his army there.

In 278 BC, soon after disembarking his army in Sicily, he lifted the Carthaginian Siege of Syracuse. Pyrrhus was proclaimed king of Sicily. He was already making plans for his son Helenus to inherit the kingdom of Sicily and his other son Alexander to be given Italy. In 277 BC, Pyrrhus captured Eryx, the strongest Carthaginian fortress in Sicily. This prompted the rest of the Carthaginian-controlled cities to defect to Pyrrhus.

In 276 BC, Pyrrhus negotiated with the Carthaginians. Although they were inclined to come to terms with Pyrrhus, supply him money and send him ships once friendly relations were established, he demanded that Carthage abandon all of Sicily and make the Libyan Sea a boundary between themselves and the Greeks. The Greek cities of Sicily opposed making peace with Carthage because the Carthaginians still controlled the powerful fortress of Lilybaeum, on the western end of the island. Pyrrhus eventually gave in to their proposals and broke off the peace negotiations. Pyrrhus's army then began besieging Lilybaeum. For two months he launched unsuccessful assaults on the city, until finally he realized he could not mount an effective siege without blockading it from the sea as well. Pyrrhus then requested manpower and money from the Sicilians in order to construct a powerful fleet. When the Sicilians became unhappy about these contributions he had to resort to compulsory contributions and force to keep them in line. These measures culminated in him proclaiming a military dictatorship of Sicily and installing military garrisons in Sicilian cities.

These actions were deeply unpopular and soon Sicilian opinion became inflamed against him. Pyrrhus had so alienated the Sicilian Greeks that they were willing to make common cause with the Carthaginians. The Carthaginians took heart from this and sent another army against him. This army was promptly defeated. In spite of this victory, Sicily continued to grow increasingly hostile to Pyrrhus, who began to consider abandoning Sicily. At this point, Samnite and Tarentine envoys reached Pyrrhus and informed him that of all the Greek cities in Italy, only Tarentum had not been conquered by Rome. Pyrrhus made his decision and departed from Sicily. As his ship left the island, he turned and, foreshadowing the Punic Wars, said to his companions: "What a wrestling ground we are leaving, my friends, for the Carthaginians and the Romans." While his army was being transported by ship to mainland Italy, Pyrrhus's navy was destroyed by the Carthaginians at the Battle of the Strait of Messina, with 98 warships sunk or disabled out of 110.

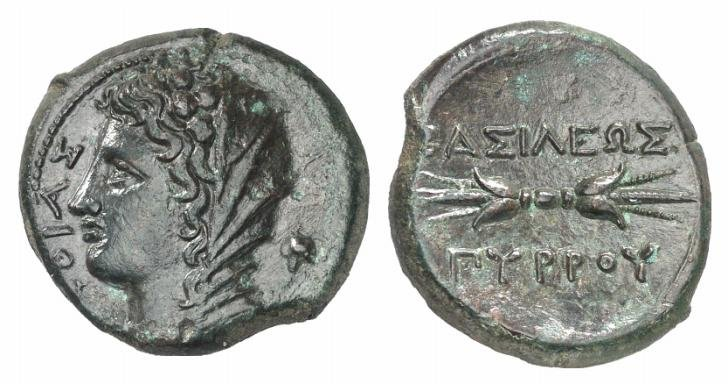
Coin of Pyrrhus minted at Syracuse, 278 BC. Obverse: Veiled head of Phtia with oak wreath, caption ΦΘΙΑΣ (of Phtia). Reverse: Thunderbolt, ΒΑΣΙΛΕΩΣ ΠΥΡΡΟΥ (of King Pyrrhus).

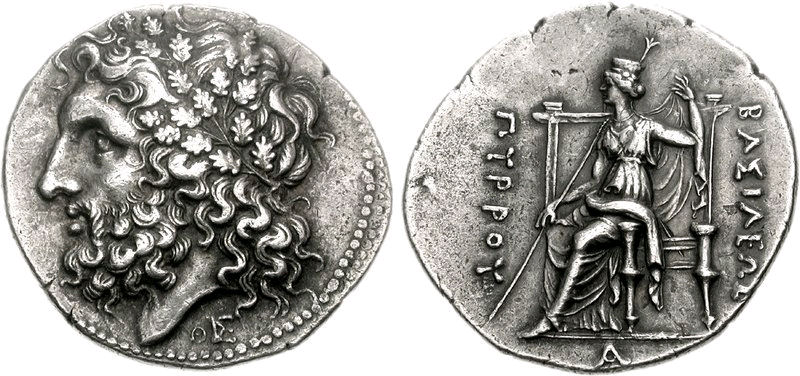
Pyrrhos, King of Epeiros, 297–272 BC. Head of Zeus in wreath of oak / Demeter seated, holding long sceptre and her veil; caption ΒΑΣΙΛΕΩΣ ΠΥΡΡΟΥ (of king Pyrrhus).

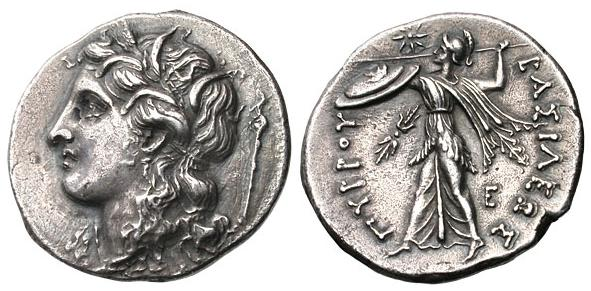
Coin of Pyrrhus, Kingdom of Epirus Head of Kore left, wreathed with grain, long torch behind / Athena Alkis advancing left, brandishing spear in right hand & holding shield on left arm, star before face, thunderbolt in left field, E in right field; inscription BAΣIΛEΩΣ ΠYΡΡOY (of King Pyrrhus).

== Retreat from Italy ==
While Pyrrhus had been campaigning against the Carthaginians, the Romans rebuilt their army by calling up thousands of fresh recruits. Near Beneventum, one of the two Roman consuls for that year (275 BC), Manius Curius Dentatus, had camped with his men, while the other was in Lucania, where Pyrrhus sent part of his army to prevent him from reinforcing Curius, whom Pyrrhus himself was left to deal with. Pyrrhus set out at night in order to reach the enemy secretly, but the dense vegetation of the area caused problems for his men, who arrived only at daylight, when they were tired and could not pass unnoticed.

As a result the attack was repulsed, with Pyrrhus losing half of his elephants. The next day the Romans took the initiative of the attack. Their initial attack, thanks to the cunning of Pyrrhus and the strong resistance of the Epirotes, failed. However a second wave frightened the elephants – possibly with flaming arrows – causing them to rush against the Epirotes. The latter left the battlefield in disorder, and Pyrrhus had no choice but to withdraw from the battle.

After this inconclusive outcome, Pyrrhus decided to end his campaign in Italy and return to Epirus which resulted in the loss of essentially all the gains he had made in Italy. Only the city of Tarentum remained under the dominion of the Epirotes.

== Last wars and death ==
The Siege of Sparta, by François Topino-Lebrun

His western campaign had taken a heavy toll on his army as well as his treasury. Despite (or perhaps because of) this, Pyrrhus went to war yet again. The realm of his rival king Antigonus Gonatas of Macedon was the most obvious target. Pyrrhus raised an army from his Epirote garrisons, Gallic mercenaries and the troops he had brought back from Italy and marched east into Macedon. He won an easy victory at the Battle of the Aous and took most of Macedon.

Antigonus managed to hold on to a number of coastal cities. He then waited for an opportunity to reclaim his kingdom while Pyrrhus was already looking for another war to fight. Furthermore, Pyrrhus made himself very unpopular in Macedon by allowing his Gauls to plunder the tombs of the Macedonian kings at Aegae.

In 272 BC, Cleonymus, a Spartan of royal blood who was hated among fellow Spartans, asked Pyrrhus to attack Sparta and place him in power. Pyrrhus agreed to the plan, intending to win control of the Peloponnese for himself, but unexpected strong resistance thwarted his assault on Sparta. On the retreat he lost his firstborn son Ptolemy, who had been in command of the rearguard.

Pyrrhus had little time to mourn, as he was immediately offered an opportunity to intervene in a civic dispute in Argos. Since Antigonus Gonatas was approaching too, he hastened to enter the city with his army by stealth, only to find the place crowded with hostile troops. During the confused Battle of Argos in the narrow city streets, Pyrrhus was trapped. While he was fighting an Argive soldier, the soldier's old mother, who was watching from a rooftop, threw a tile which knocked him from his horse and broke part of his spine, paralyzing him. Whether he was alive or not after the blow is unknown, but his death was assured when a Macedonian soldier named Zopyrus, though frightened by the look on the face of the unconscious king, hesitantly and ineptly beheaded his motionless body. This story is later recounted by Plutarch in his Life of Pyrrhus.

Antigonus had him cremated with all honours and sent his surviving son Helenus back to Epirus. That same year, upon hearing the news of Pyrrhus's death, the Tarentinians surrendered to Rome.

== Pyrrhus's army ==
As the main instrument of his political and military success, the army of Pyrrhus represented a partial continuation of the Macedonian hosts of Alexander the Great. However, in spite of many "Successor" features (such as the existence of elite bodyguard "Companions" who owed personal loyalty to the ruler and furnished his staff officers) the army was based on an existing Epirote warrior tradition predating the accession of Pyrrhus.

The Macedonian link was further diluted by the employment of specialist allies such as Tarentine light horse and Cretan mercenary archers.

== Legacy ==
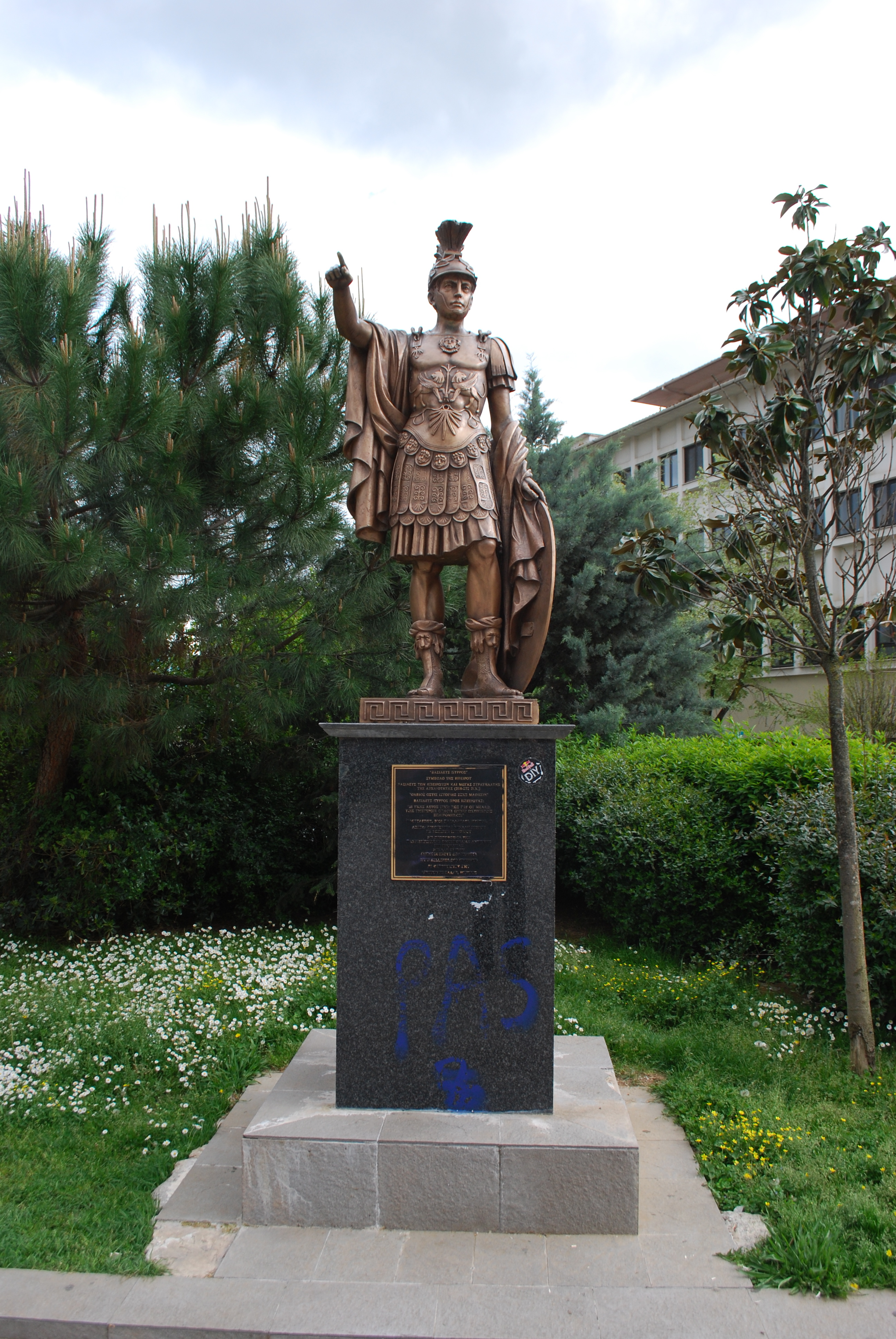
A statue of Pyrrhus in Ioannina, Greece

In his Life of Pyrrhus, Plutarch records that Hannibal ranked him as the greatest commander the world had ever seen, though in the Life of Titus Quinctius Flamininus, Plutarch writes that Hannibal placed him second after Alexander the Great. This latter account is also given by Appian. While he was a mercurial and often restless leader, and not always a wise king, he was considered one of the greatest military commanders of his time.

The concept of a monarch having a touch that could heal all wounds may have originated with Pyrrhus. As Pliny the Elder states, Pyrrhus's great toe on his right foot cured diseases of the spleen by merely touching the patient. His toe could also not be burned so when his body was cremated, his toe was put in a coffer, and kept at an unknown temple.

Pyrrhus lends his name to the term "Pyrrhic victory", which stems from a statement he is alleged to have made following the Battle of Asculum. In response to congratulations for winning a costly victory over the Romans, he is reported to have said, "If we are victorious in one more battle with the Romans, we shall be utterly ruined". The term has therefore come to signify a victory that is won at such cost that it loses all its worth.

Pyrrhus and his campaign in Italy provided the Greek world with an opportunity to check the advance of Rome further into the Mediterranean. The failure to fully exploit this opportunity while Rome was still only an Italian regional power had immense consequences. The conquest of Magna Graecia by the Romans brought them into direct competition with Carthage, ultimately leading to the First Punic War. Rome's victory in this conflict transformed it from a regional power to one of the most powerful states in the Mediterranean. Over the next century the failure of the various kingdoms and city-states of the Hellenistic world to form a united front against Rome resulted in their reduction to either the status of Roman client states, or outright annexation by the Roman Republic. By 197 BC, Macedonia and many southern Greek city-states became Roman clients; in 188 BC, the Seleucid Empire was forced to cede most of Asia Minor to Rome's ally Pergamon (Pergamum). In 133 BC Attalus III, the last King of Pergamon (excluding the pretender Eumenes III), bequeathed the Kingdom and its considerable territories in Asia Minor to Rome in his will. At the destruction of Corinth in 146 BC Rome defeated Corinth and its allies of the Achaean League. The league was dissolved and Rome took formal possession of the territories which now constitute modern-day Greece, reorganizing them into the Roman province of Macedonia. In 63 BC, Pompey Magnus delivered the coup de grâce to the already much-reduced Seleucid Empire, deposing its last ruler and creating Roman Syria from its remaining territories. The Ptolemaic Kingdom lingered on as a Roman client state until annexation in 30 BC as Roman Egypt.

Pyrrhus wrote memoirs and several books on the art of war. These have since been lost, although, according to Plutarch, Hannibal was influenced by them, and they received praise from Cicero.

Pyrrhus was married five times: his first wife Antigone bore him a daughter called Olympias and a son named Ptolemy in honour of her stepfather. She died in 295 BC, possibly in childbirth, since that was the same year her son was born. His second wife was Lanassa, daughter of King Agathocles of Syracuse (r. 317–289 BC), whom he married in about 295 BC; the couple had a son, Alexander. His third wife was the daughter of Audoleon, King of Paeonia. His fourth wife was the Illyrian princess Bircenna, who was the daughter of King Bardylis II,(r. c. 295–290 BC) who bore Pyrrhus's youngest son, Helenus. His fifth wife was the daughter of Ptolemy Keraunos, whom he married in 281/280 BC.

Preceded by Alcetas II	King of Epirus; 307–302 BC	Succeeded by Neoptolemus II
Preceded by Neoptolemus II	King of Epirus; 297–272 BC	Succeeded by Alexander II
Preceded by Demetrius I Poliorcetes	King of Macedon; 288–285 BC; With: Lysimachus	Succeeded by Antigonus II Gonatas
Preceded by Antigonus II Gonatas	King of Macedon; 274–272 BC	Succeeded by Antigonus II Gonatas
