= Siege of Lilybaeum (c. 277 BC) =

Military investment during the Pyrrhic War

- Part of the Sicilian Wars and the Pyrrhic War
Date	277 or 276 BC
Location	Lilybaeum, Sicily
Result	Carthaginian victory
Territorial changes	Carthage reconquers all lost territory in 272 BC

Belligerents
Carthage	Epirus; Greek allies

Commanders and leaders
Unknown	Pyrrhos I

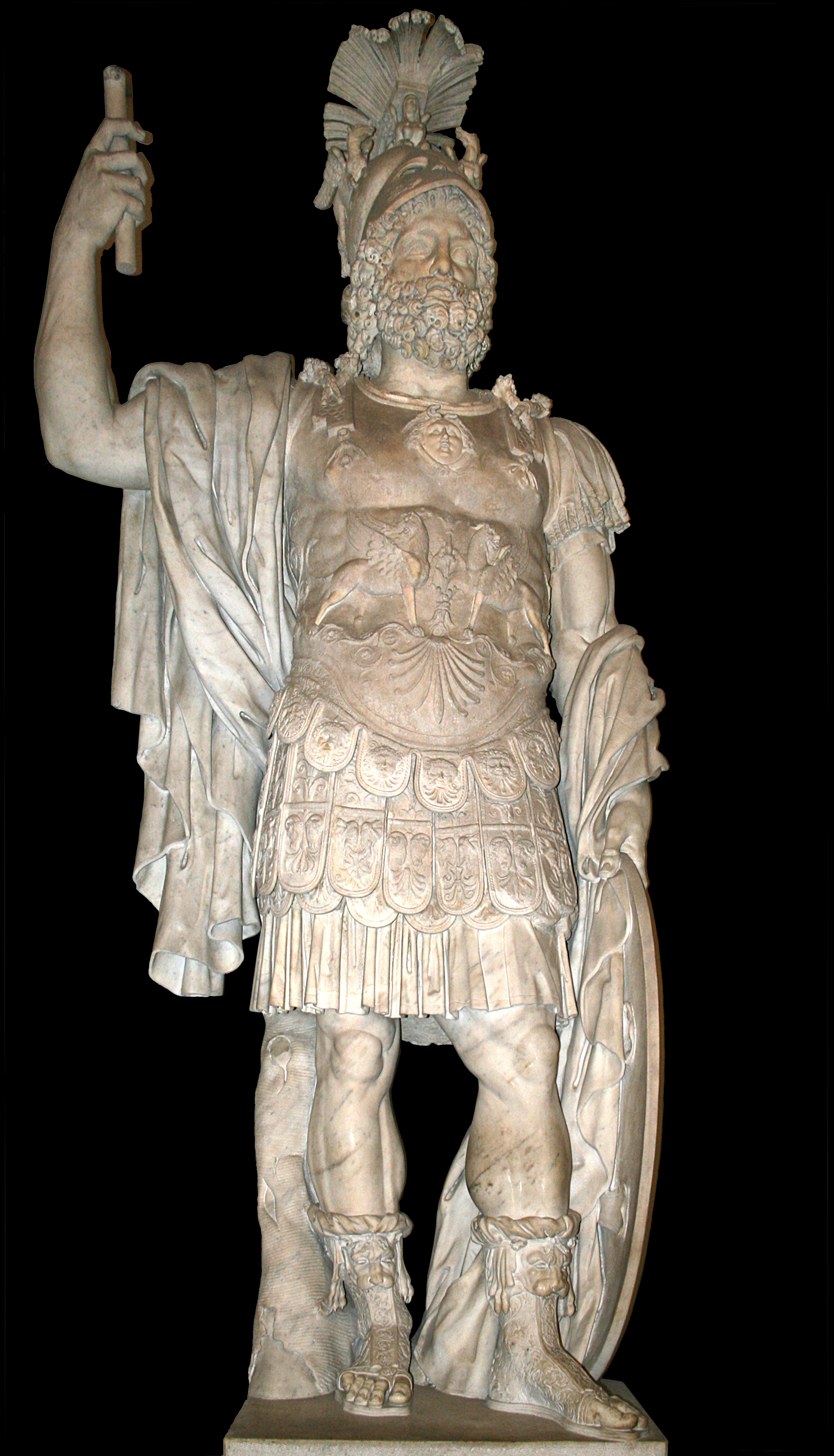
Colossal statue of Mars (Pyrrhus). Marble, Roman artwork.

The siege of Lilybaeum was a military operation of the Pyrrhic War in 277 or 276 BC, when an Epirote-Syracusian army led by Pyrrhus of Epirus attempted to capture the strategically important port city of Lilybaeum held by the Carthaginian Empire.

== Background ==
Postponing his Italian campaign, Pyrrhus sailed for Sicily to fight the Carthaginians who were besieging Syracuse. He evaded the Carthaginian fleet, landed in Catana, and entered Syracuse where he was proclaimed commander-in-chief. The Epirote King subsequently drove off Carthage's field army, captured the cities of Panormus and Eryx and refused Carthage's offer to surrender everything in Sicily except for Lilybaeum, which they direly needed if they sought to keep their hold on Sardinia.

== Siege ==
The city of Lilybaeum (modern Marsala), lying on the western end of Sicily, connected the island with Africa and provided Carthage with an advanced harbor on the route to Sardinia. Pyrrhus besieged the city but after two months he found the fortifications to be too strong to be taken. Unwilling to be bogged down in a lengthy sea blockade, he lifted the siege.

== Aftermath ==
After failing to take Lilybaeum, Pyrrhus decided to take the war on Carthage's own soil in Africa for which he built a fleet, but his preparations were frustrated by Greek resistance to the heavy demands the expedition exacted on the Sicilians.

== Sources ==
- Venning, Timothy; Drinkwater, John (2011). Chronology of the Roman Empire. Continuum International Publishing Group. ISBN 9781441154781.
- Cowan, Ross (2007). For the glory of Rome:a history of warriors and warfare. MBI Publishing Company. ISBN 9781853677335.
- Mommsen's History of Rome. Wildside Press LLC. 2008. ISBN 9781434462329.
