= List of cities in ancient Epirus =

Epirus in antiquity.

This is a list of cities in ancient Epirus. These were Greek poleis, komes or fortresses except for Nicopolis, which was founded by Octavian. Classical Epirus was divided into three regions: Chaonia, Molossia, Thesprotia, each named after the dominant tribe that lived there. A number of ancient settlements in these regions remain unidentified.

== Cities ==
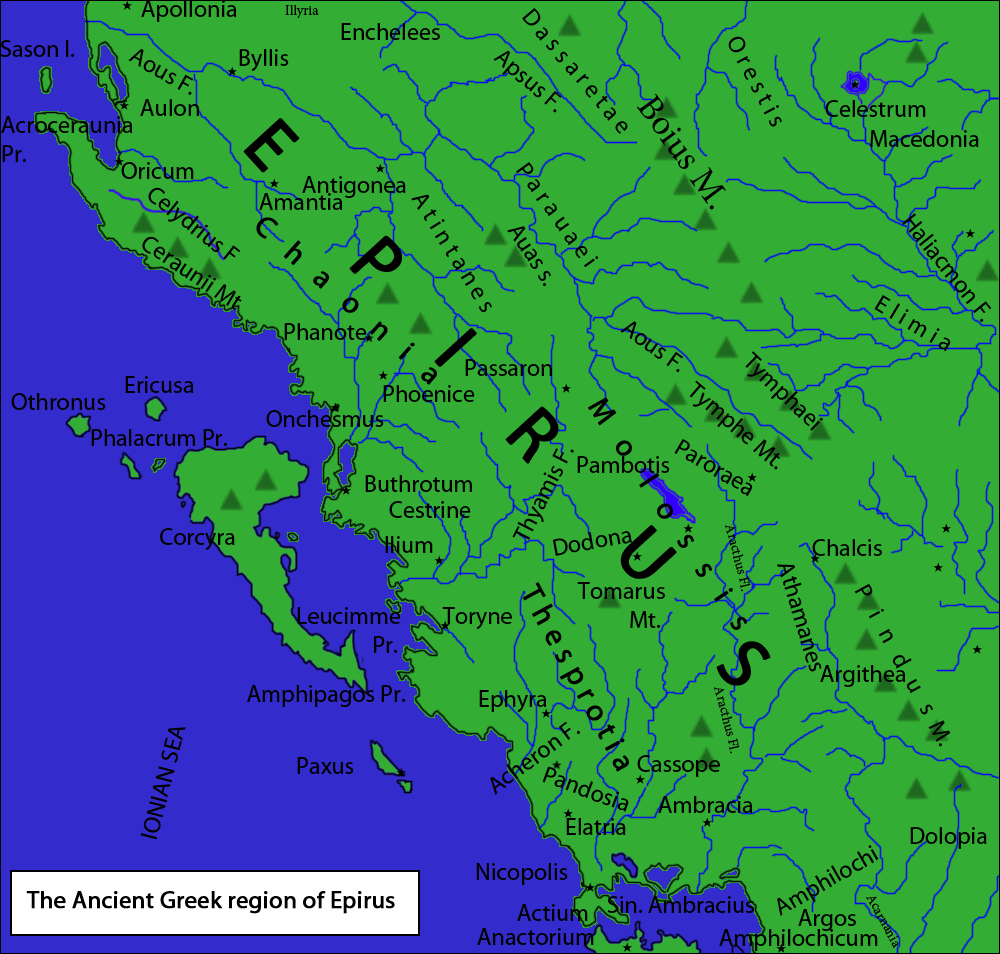
Epirus in antiquity, reproduced from a map made by Heinrich Kiepert, published in 1902.

=== Chaonia ===
- Amantia, main settlement of the Amantes
- Antigonia (Chaonia), polis founded by Pyrrhus of Epirus
- Artichia, polis
- Aulon, modern-day Vlorë, first attested in the 2nd century AD
- Baiake pre-Hellenistic polis
- Bouthroton, Chaonian polis
- Cestrine or Cammania, modern-day Filiates
- Chimaera (Chaonia), or Chimera (polis) Chaonian polis, modern-day Himara
- Hekatompedon, pre-Hellenistic polis
- Olympe, polis in the region of the Amantes
- Onchesmos, pre-Hellenistic polis, modern-day Saranda
- Orikos, founded by Euboeans Euboeans colony
- Panormos (Epirus) or Panormus (Epirus), pre-Hellenistic polis
- Phanoteia, polis
- Phoenice, chief polis of the Chaonians, modern-day Finiq
- Photike, pre-Hellenistic polis, modern-day Paramythia
- Thronion, colony of the Euboeans - Locrians

=== Molossia ===
- Dodona, sanctuary, the second most important oracle in ancient Greece after Delphi
- Eurymenai (Epirus), polis
- Orraon, founded 385 BC polis
- Passaron, polis

=== Thesprotia ===
- Bouneima pre Hellenistic
- Korkyra (polis) polis
- Tekmona or Tekmon polis
- Charadros (Epirus) pre Hellenistic
- Chyton founded by Ionians from Klazomenai
- Zmaratha polis
- Gitanae polis
- Elateia (Epirus) founded by Elisians polis
- Batiai founded by Elisians polis
- Thesprotia (polis) pre Hellenistic
- Trampya pre Hellenistic
- Helikranon pre Hellenistic
- Ilium (Epirus) pre Hellenistic
- Elina (Epirus) pre Hellenistic
- Elaias Limen pre Hellenistic
- Sybota pre Hellenistic
- Cheimerion pre Hellenistic
- Ephyra (Epirus) or Kichyros founded by Chaonians in Parthenius's story of Anthippe polis
- Oropos (Epirus) pre Hellenistic
- Toryne or Torone polis
- Pandosia (Epirus) founded by Elisians polis
- Elaea founded by Corinthians polis
- Bucheta founded by Elisians polis
- Cassope pre Hellenistic
- Elatria founded by Elisians
- Poionos polis
- Berenike (Epirus) polis
- Kastrosykia

== See also ==
- List of ancient Epirotes
- List of Ancient Greek tribes
- List of ancient Greek cities
- List of ancient Greeks
- List of cities in ancient Acarnania
