= Thesprotians =

Αncient Greek tribe that inhabited the region of Epirus

Thesprotia in antiquity. (=Tesprotia; map labeled in Spanish.)

The Thesprotians (Ancient Greek: Θεσπρωτοί, romanized: Thesprōtoí) were an ancient Greek tribe, akin to the Molossians, inhabiting the kingdom of Thesprotis in Epirus. Together with the Molossians and the Chaonians, they formed the main tribes of the northwestern Greek group. On their northeastern frontier, they neighbored the Chaonians and on their northern frontier they neighbored the kingdom of the Molossians. The poet Homer frequently mentions Thesprotia in the Odyssey, which had friendly relations with Ithaca and Doulichi. The Thesprotians originally controlled the Dodona oracle, the oldest religious shrine in Greece. Later, they were part of the Epirus until they were annexed into the Roman Empire.

== Geography ==
Strabo puts the Thesprotians' territory, Thesprotis, on the coast of southwest Epirus. Thesprotis stretched between the Ambracian Gulf in the south to the River Thyamis (modern-day Kalamas) in the north, and between the Pindus mountains and the Ionian Sea. According to legend, the nation got its name from the Pelasgian leader and first governor Thesprotos, who built Cichyrus (Cichorus), which later was called Ephyra, the capital of Thesprotia. Other important cities of Thesprotia include Pandosia, Titani, Cheimerium, Toryne, Phanote, Cassope, Photice, Boucheta and Batiai. There was a city called Thesprotia sharing the same name with the tribe itself.

== Tribe ==
According to Strabo, the Thesprotians (along with the Chaonians and the Molossians) were the most famous among the fourteen tribes of Epirus, as they once ruled over the whole region. The Chaonians ruled Epirus first while the Thesprotians and Molossians ruled afterwards. Strabo also records that the Thesprotians, Molossians, and Macedonians referred to old men as pelioi and old women as peliai (PIE: *pel- means grey; Ancient Greek: pelitnós – "grey", peleia – "dove", so-called because of its dusky grey color, poliós – grey, and pollós – "dark"). Their senators were called Peligones (Πελιγόνες), similar to Macedonian Peliganes (Πελιγᾶνες). An inscription from Goumani, dated to the second half of the 4th century BC, indicates that the organisation of the Thesprotian state was similar to that of the other Epirotes. Terms for office were prostates (Greek: προστάτες) literally meaning "protectors" like most Greek tribal states at the time. Other terms for office were grammateus (Greek: γραμματέυς) meaning "secretary", demiourgoi (Greek: δημιουργοί) literally meaning "creators", hieromnemones (Greek: ιερομνήμονες) literally meaning "of the sacred memory" and synarchontes (Greek: συνάρχοντες) literally meaning "co-rulers".

=== Subtribes ===
The Thesprotians were divided into many subtribes that included the Elopes, Graeci, Kassopaeoi, Dryopes, Dodonians (Greek: Δωδωναίοι), Aegestaeoi, Eleaeoi, Elinoi, Ephyroi, Ikadotoi, Kartatoi, Kestrinoi, Klauthrioi, Kropioi, Larissaeoi, Onopernoi, Opatoi, Tiaeoi, Torydaeoi, Fanoteis, Farganaeoi, Parauaei, Fylates and the Chimerioi. Some of these tribes throughout antiquity migrated to and established colonies in Ithaca, Lefkada, Acarnania, parts of southern Greece, Thessaly and Italy.

== Mythology ==
According to the Telegony (Epic Cycle), Odysseus came upon the land of Thesprotia where he stayed for a number of years. He married the Thesprotian queen, Callidice, and had a son with her named Polypoetes. Odysseus led the Thesprotians in the war against the Brygoi (Brygi), but lost the battle because Ares was on the side of the Brygoi. Athena went to support Odysseus, by engaging the war god in another confrontation until Apollo separated them. When Callidice died, Odysseus returned home to Ithaca, leaving their son, Polypoetes, to rule Thesprotia.

== History ==
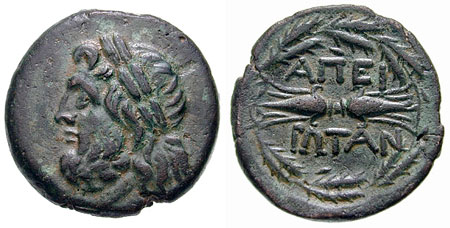
Coin of the Epirote League, depicting Zeus (left) and a lighting with the word "ΑΠΕΙΡΩΤΑΝ" – Epirotes (right)

- Allied with Corinth in the 5th century BC.
- Allied with Athens and Molossis, 415–404 BC.
- Occupation of Kassopaea, Dodona, east Thesprotia by Molossians 400 BC.
- The Thesprotian League, middle 4th century BC.
- Allied with Macedonia, 343–300 BC.
- Part of the League of Molossis, 300 BC.
- Part of the Epirote League, included Chaonians and Molossians, 220–167 BC.
- Assigned as a district of Macedonia within Rome, 148–27 BC.
- Assigned as a district of Achaea within the Roman Empire from 27 BC.

== List of Thesprotians ==
- Queen Callidice of Thesprotia, wife of Odysseus.
- King Aidoneus of Ephyra, husband of Persephone.
- Poionos: Admatos; Thesprotoi: Petoas, Simakos; Skepas, Aristodamos from Cassopea; Dioszotos from Pandosia; Theorodokoi in Epidauros, 365 BC.
- Alexandros prostates, mid-4th century BC.
- Xenarchos son of Xenon from Cassopea (tomb stele), c. 310 BC.
- Gallithos son of Xenon from Cassopea (tomb stele), c. 275 BC.
- Sokratis daughter of Sotion from Boucheta (tomb stele), c. 250 BC.
- Xenias of Cassopea proxenos in Thyrrheion Acarnania, 3rd century BC.
- Alkimos (son of Nikandros) proxenos in Delphi, c. 215 BC.
- Eucharon, Eunostidas proxenoi in Thermos (Aetolia), late 3rd century – early 2nd century BC.
- Milon (son of Sosandros) honoured by Koinon of Epirotes, late 3rd century BC.
- Opatos dedicated to Zeus Naos, Dione, and Zeus Bouleus in Dodona, c. 215–210 BC.
- Simakos (son of Phalakrion) 2nd century BC Pancratiast, Epidauria (fined 1000 staters, along with other two athletes).
- Demetrios (son of Machatas) dedicated to Apollon at Kourion, Cyprus, 200–193 BC, Ptolemaic city commander of Kourion.
- Alkemachos (son of Charops) Diaulos (~400-metre race) Panathenaics, 190/189 BC, nephew of Demetrios.
- Echenika daughter of Menedamos and Aristokrateia from Kassopa, wife of Lysixenos (tomb stele), 2nd century BC.

== See also ==
- Chaonia
- Necromanteion
- Ancient Thesprotia
