= Elaea (Epirus) =

Tourist attractions in Greece

Coordinates: 39°26′24″N 20°33′02″E

Elaea was located in Thesprotia in antiquity.

Elaea or Elaia (Ancient Greek: Ἐλαία), also Elea (Ἐλέα), was a town of Thesprotia in ancient Epirus toward the mouth of the Acheron river. The town is mentioned by Ptolemy. Thucydides calls the surrounding district Elaeatis (Ἐλαιατις) and indicates that Ephyra was in the territory of Elaea. Its port was Elaias Limen, literally the "Bay of Elaea", which the Periplus of Pseudo-Scylax asserts was the main port of Thesprotia.

Coins ascribed to the town, with the inscription "ΕΛΕΑΤΑΝ" or "ΕΛΕΑΙ", have been found that have been dated c. 360–335 BCE.

The town's site is identified as near Chrysavgi, where archaeological exploration has taken place.

== Gallery ==
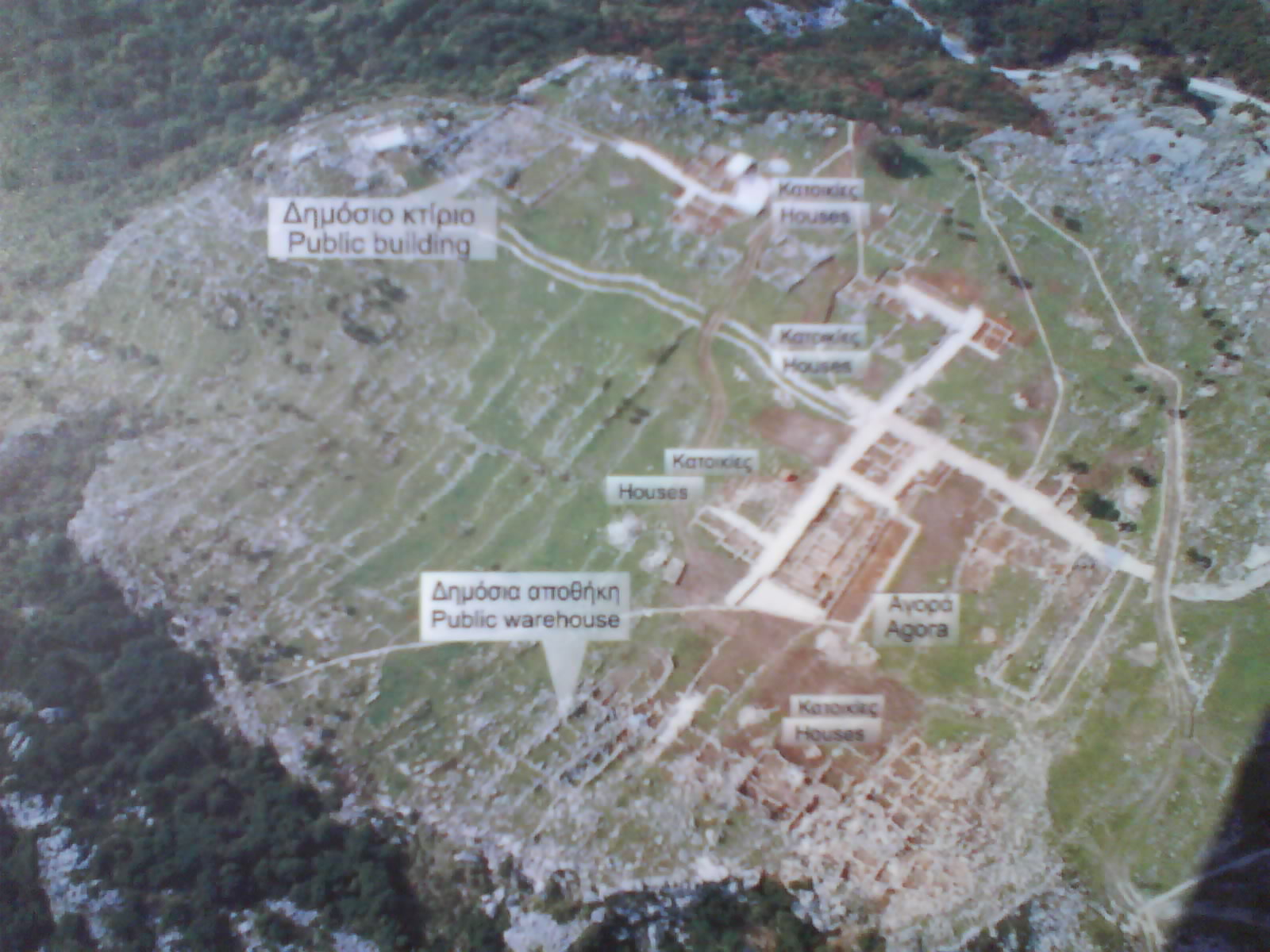
Aerial view of the Archaeological site of Elaea

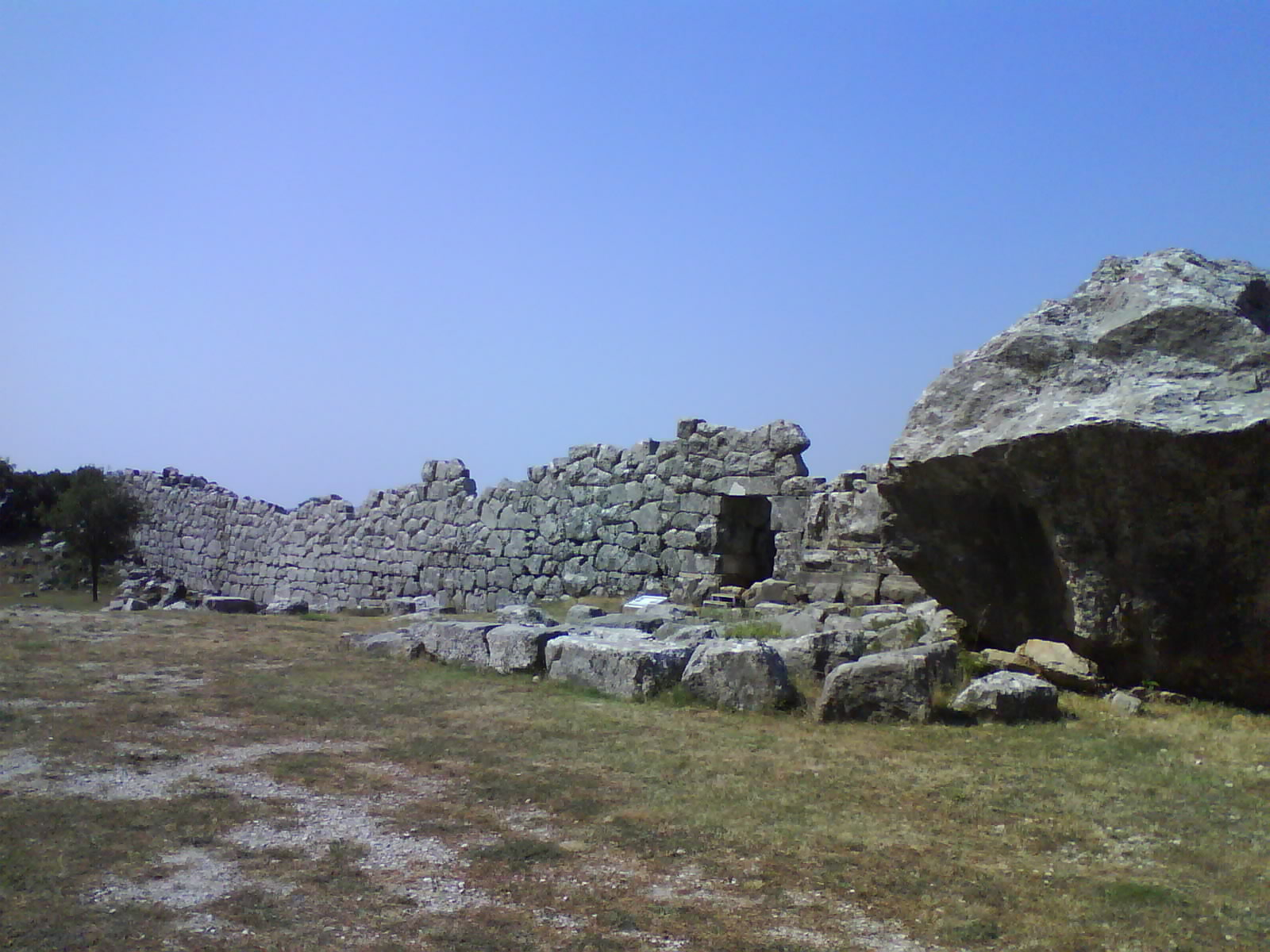
Walls and gate of Elaea

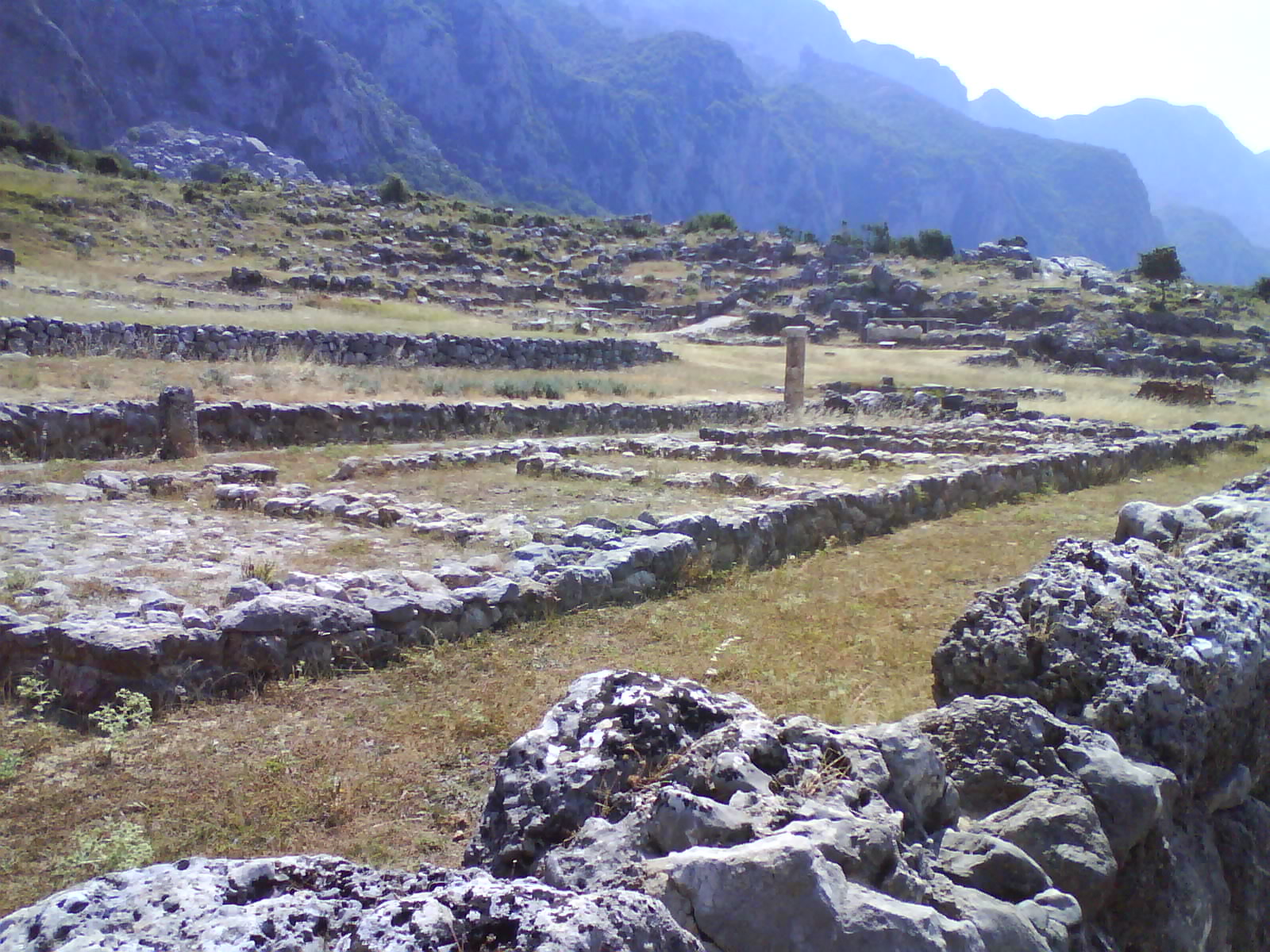
Ruins of the Agora

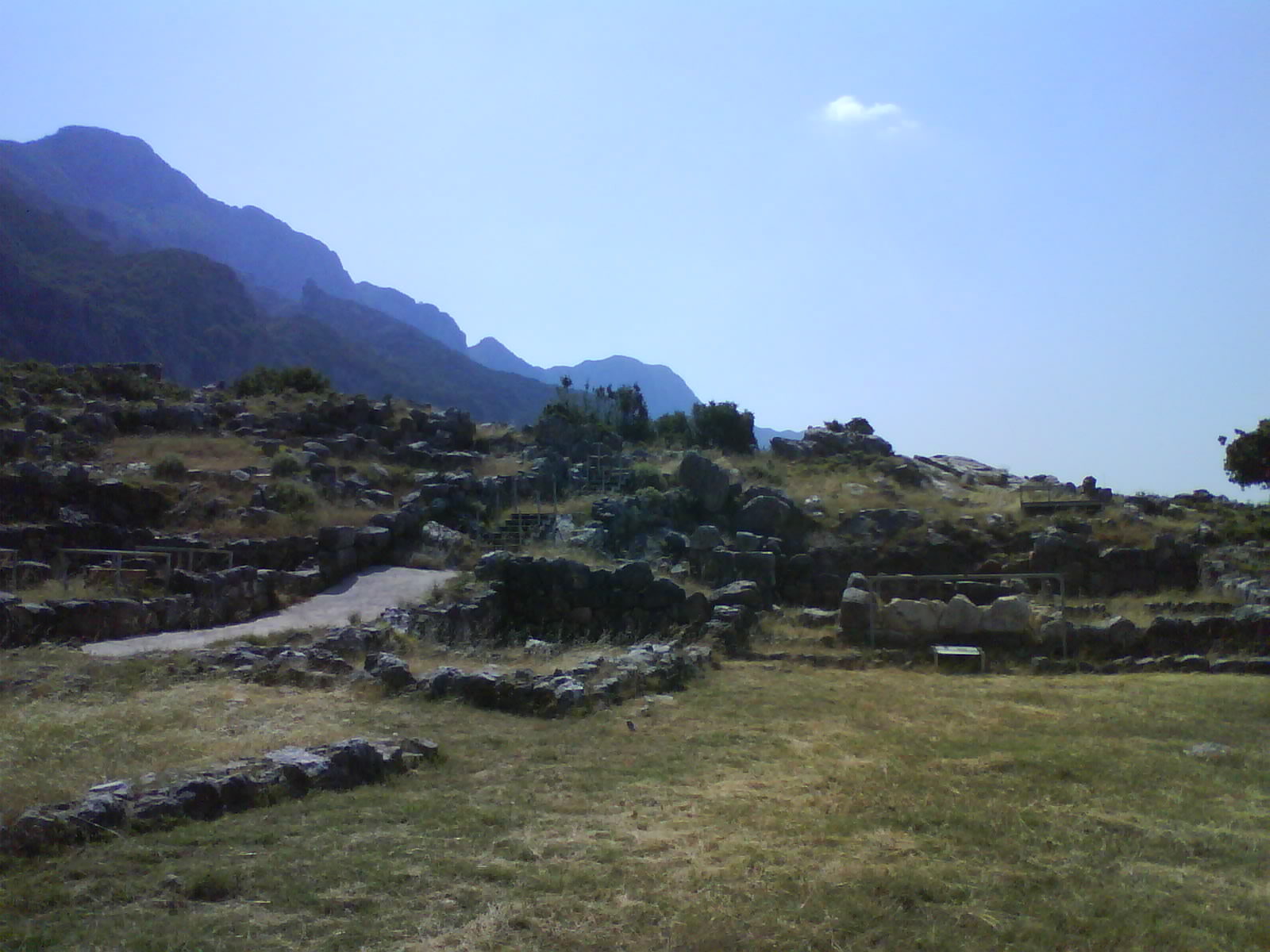
Ruins in Elaea

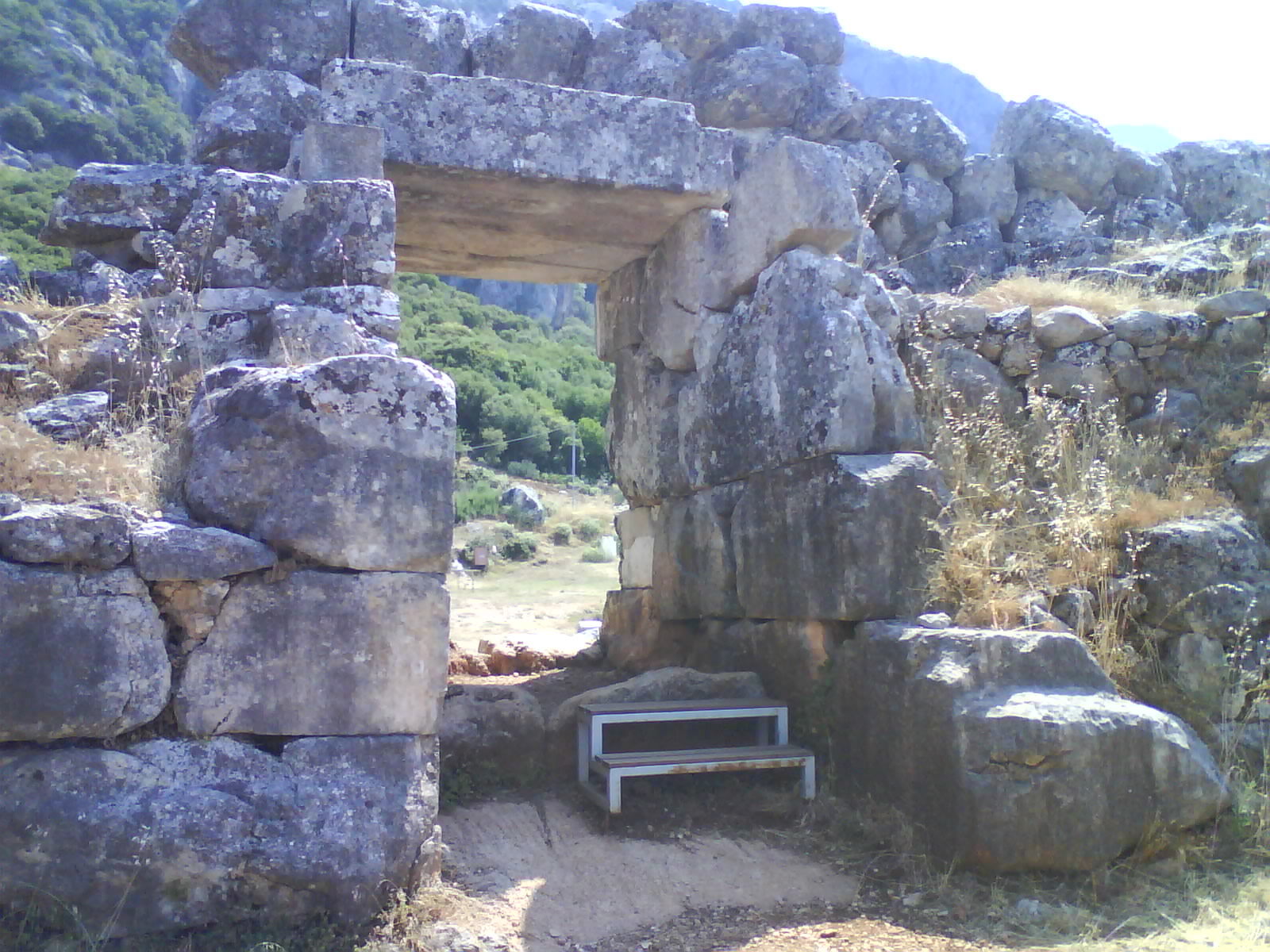
Gate of Elaea

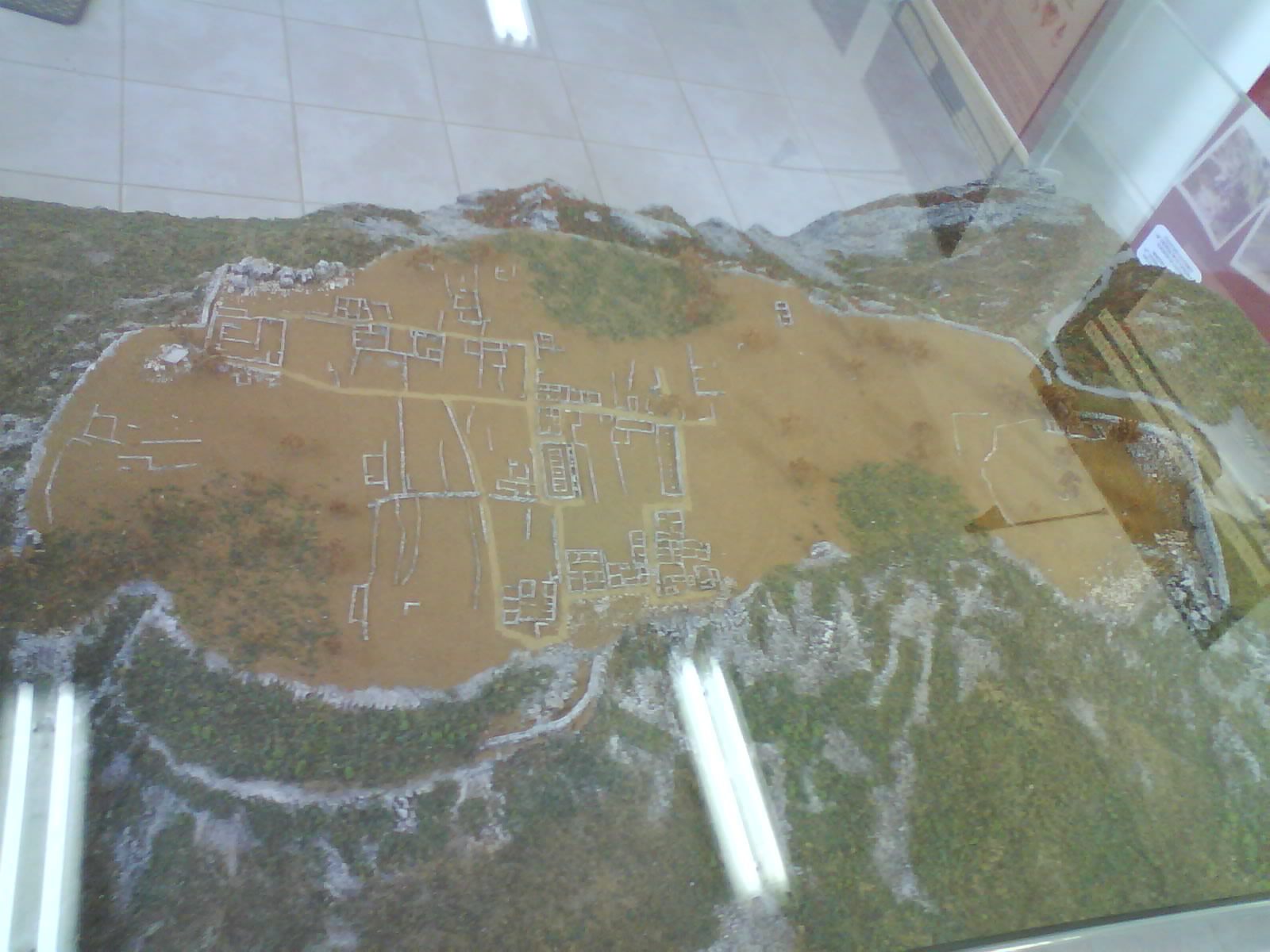
Model of the excavated ruins in Elaea

== See also ==
- List of cities in ancient Epirus
