= Cassopaei =

Ancient Greek tribe

The Cassopaei (Greek: Κασσωπαῖοι) were an ancient Greek tribe living in ancient Epirus and occupying the coast between Thesprotia and the Ambracian Gulf, and bordering upon Nicopolis. Their chief town was Cassope (Κασσώπη). The Periplus of Pseudo-Scylax describes the Cassopaei as living in villages; but they afterwards rose to such power as to obtain possession of Pandosia, Buchaetium, and Elateia. We learn from another authority that Batiae was also in their territory.
