= Elaias Limen =

Coordinates: 39°14′43″N 20°28′42″E

Epirus in antiquity

Elaias Limen (Ancient Greek: Ἐλαίας Λιμήν - literally, "Bay of Elaea"), also Elaea or Elaia (Ἐλαία), was a harbour town of Thesprotia in ancient Epirus at the mouth of the Acheron river. The town is mentioned by both Scylax and Ptolemy. The Periplus of Pseudo-Scylax asserts that this was the main port of Thesprotia. The town's site is identified as near Cheimerion.

There is an archaeological site of the inland town of Elaea of which this was the harbour.

== See also ==
- List of cities in ancient Epirus
