= Elateia (Epirus) =

Town in ancient Epirus

Coordinates: 39°09′48″N 20°42′56″E

Epirus in antiquity

Elateia or Elatia (Greek: Ἐλάτεια), also Elatreia or Elatria (Ἐλατρία), was a town of the Cassopaei in Thesprotia, in ancient Epirus, mentioned by Strabo, along with Batiae and Pandosia. It is said to have been a colony of Elis (in the Peloponnese, Greece).

Its location is believed to be at the foot of Mount Zalongo, north of the modern village of Paliorophoro. This site was settled from prehistoric times. Archaeologists suggest that the settlement was fortified with a polygonal wall of 1,690 metres (5,540 feet) in circumference, which enclosed an area corresponding to a population of about 3,800.

== See also ==
- List of cities in ancient Epirus
