= Gitanae =

Ancient Greek city in Epirus

Coordinates: 39°34′15″N 20°15′41″E

Epirus in antiquity (with wrong location for Gitanae)

Gitanae or Gitana (Ancient Greek: Γίτανα), or Gitona (Γίτωνα), or Titana (Τίτανα or Τιτάνα), was a city of ancient Epirus, described by Livy as being near Corcyra, and about 10 miles from the coast. as a place of meeting of the Epirote League (Concillio Epirotarum). It is not mentioned by any other ancient writer, and it was conjectured that the word is a corrupt form of Chyton, which Ephorus spoke of as a place in Epirus colonised by Ionians from Klazomenai.

However, its site has been located as the place bearing the modern name Gkoumani, near the village of Fragma Kalama in Greece.

== Gallery ==
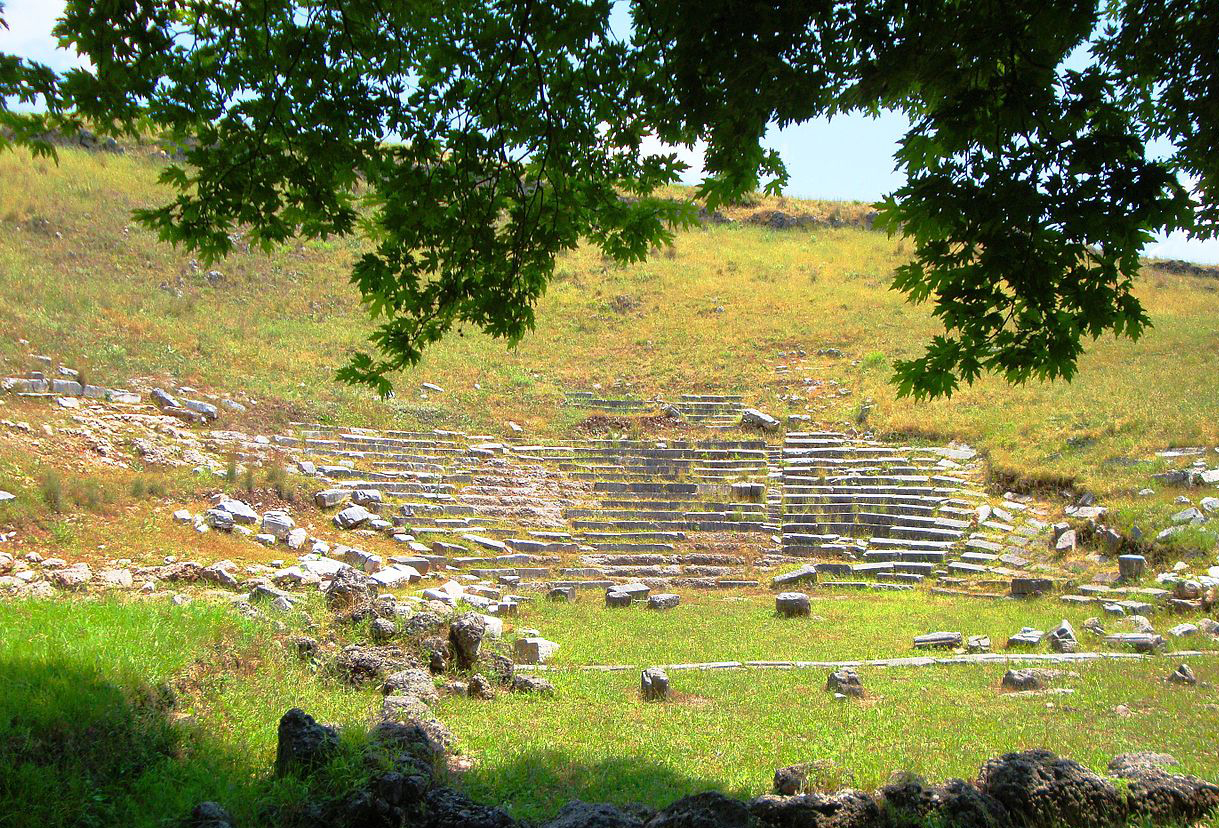
Ancient Theater at the archaeological site of Gitanae

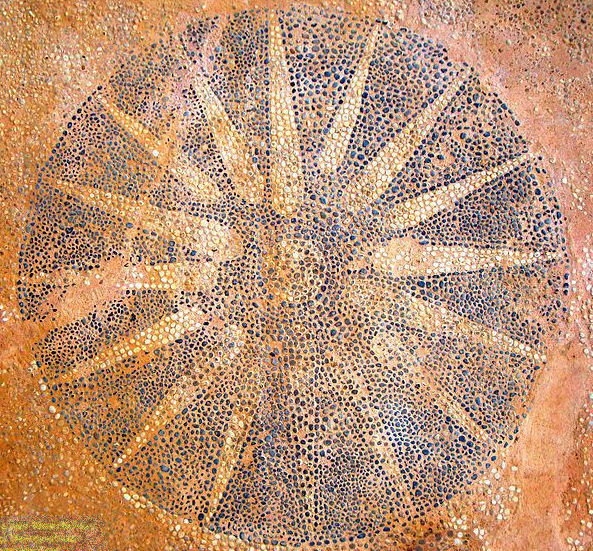
Mosaic depicting the Vergina Sun at the archaeological site of Gitanae

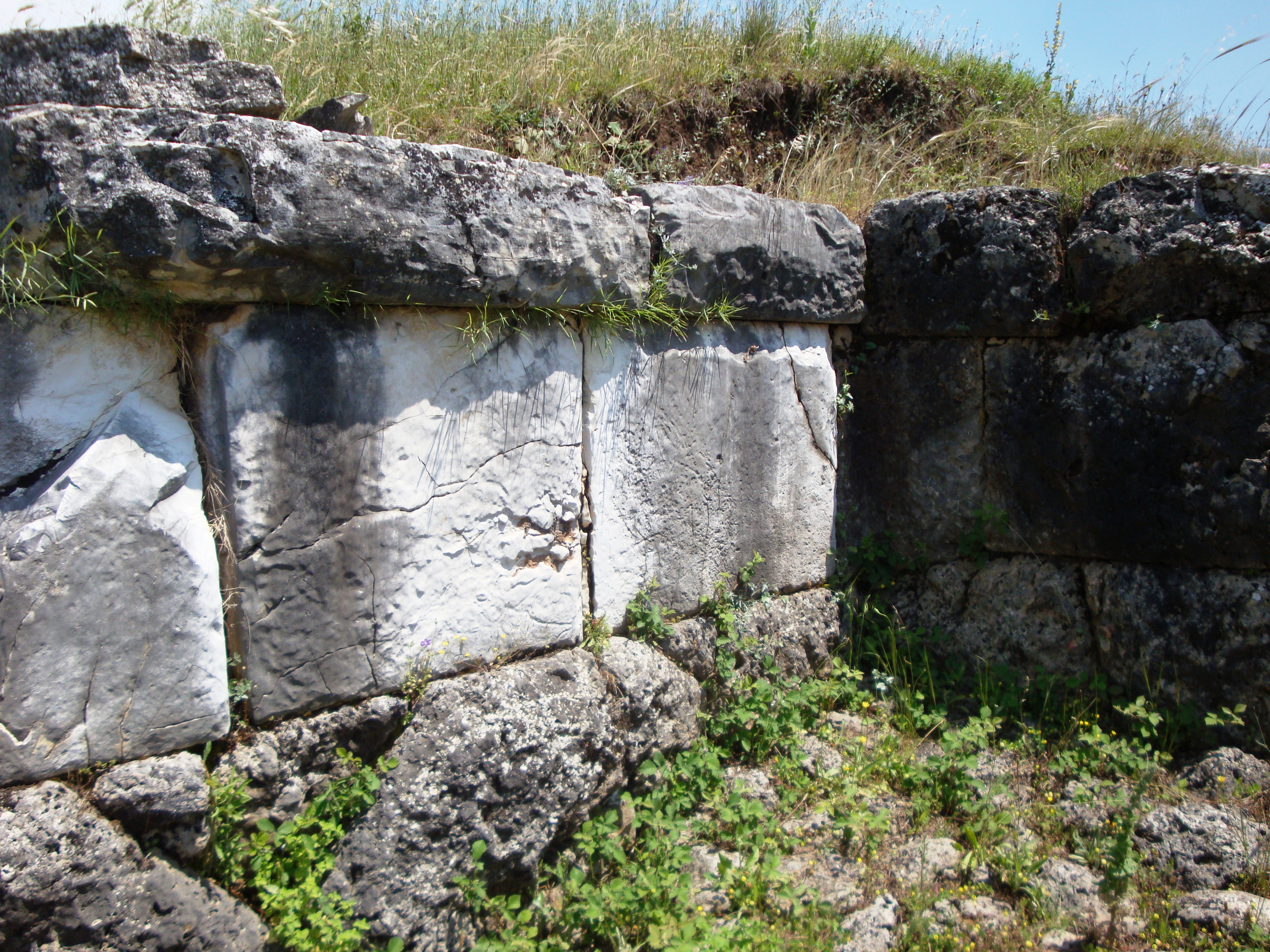
Gitanae walls

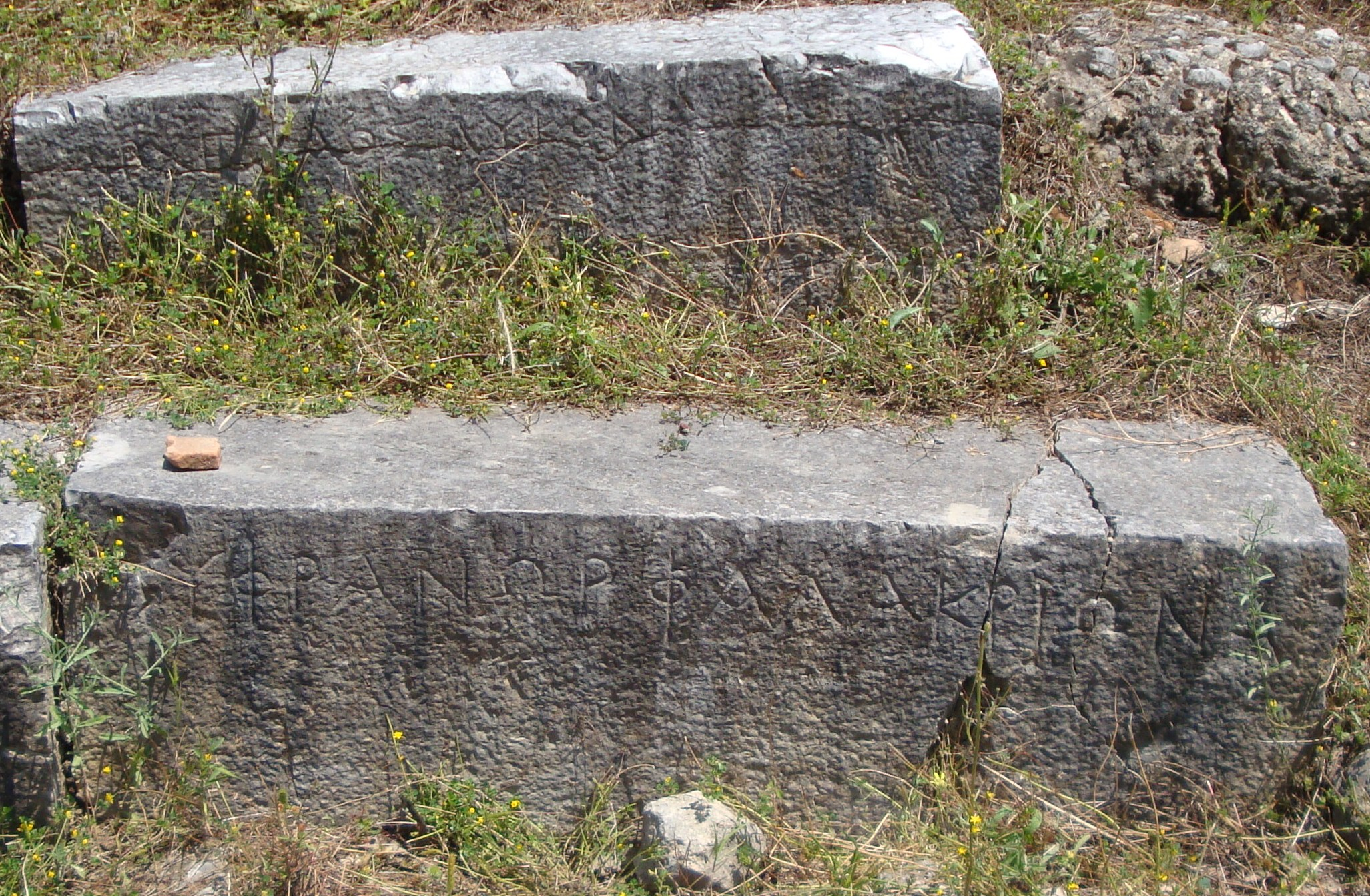
Theater seats with name inscriptions written on them

== See also ==
- List of cities in ancient Epirus
