= Eurymenae (Epirus) =

Ancient Greek city

Coordinates: 39°37′50″N 20°55′11″E

Epirus in antiquity

Eurymenae or Eurymenai (Ancient Greek: Έυρυμεναί) was an ancient Greek city of Molossis located in the region of Epirus. The city belonged to the Molossian koinon and was inhabited by the Arktanoi tribe.

Its site is tentatively located near modern Kastritsa.

== See also ==
- List of cities in ancient Epirus

== Sources ==
- Hansen, Mogens Herman; Nielsen, Thomas Heine (2004). An Inventory of Archaic and Classical Poleis. Oxford and New York: Oxford University Press. ISBN 0198140991.
