= Peliganes =

Ancient Macedonian senators

Peliganes (Greek: Πελιγᾶνες Peliganes) is the word used to refer to the Ancient Macedonian senators. The term is attested to in Hesychius, Strabo and two inscriptions (in dative peligasi), one from Dion and one from Laodicea. From the description of Hesychius and the epigraphy, it is evident that Peliganes played a more significant role in Seleucids than Macedon. In Ptolemaic Kingdom the term is unattested. The Seleucid cliché phrase was:

δεδόχθαι τοῖς πελιγᾶσιν (dedochthai tois peligasin), "having been resolved by the peliganes"

The Macedonian supreme body was called Synedrion. Other Seleucid institutions were the Archontes, Demos, Proboule, Boule, Epistatai (supervisors) and Dikastai (judges).

== Etymology ==
Strabo cites the word as Peligones, meaning the senators of both Macedonians, Thesprotians and Molossians and compares them to Gerontes (Gerousia) of Laconians and Massaliotes. He further remarks that πελιοί pelioi in the dialects of Epirus and Macedonia, means old men. Πεληός pelêos or pelios is the common Doric form, while in Attic πολιός polios means also grey, grey from age, venerable, bright. The suffix -gan is the Attic suffix -genes (genos). There are many more Macedonian inscribed eponyms such as Epigan, Peleigenes, Peleigines, Peligenes. Pelignas was finally a Macedonian or Epirote chef sent by Olympias to Alexander. Polybius mentions Adeiganes for the council, magistrates of Seleucia, (who were banished, fined and exiled by the minister Hermeias); a word unattested in epigraphy and other sources. Editor P. Roussel has emended to Peleiganes, while Hammond suggests that it might be an original West Macedonian word.
