= Ancient Thesprotia =

Region of ancient Greece

Thesprotis (Greek: Θεσπρωτίς, Thesprōtís), or Thesprotia (Θεσπρωτία, Thesprōtia), was an ancient region in Epirus in northwestern Greece. It encompassed the west-central part of Epirus, and it roughly included the territories of the present-day territorial units of Thesprotia and Preveza.

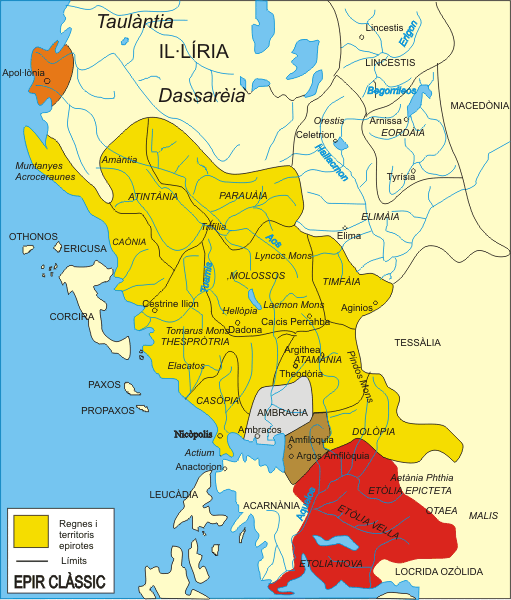
Regions of ancient Epirus

== Geography ==
Herodotus considered the Thesprotian territory to be part of Hellas (i.e. Greece). Strabo puts the Thesprotians' territory, Thesprotis, on the coast of southwest Epirus. Thesprotis stretched between the Ambracian Gulf in the south to the River Thyamis (modern-day Kalamas) in the north, and between the Pindus mountains and the Ionian Sea. The capital of Thesprotia was Cichyrus (also known as Ephyra). Other important cities of Thesprotia include Pandosia, Titani, Cheimerium, Toryne, Phanote, Cassope, Photice, Boucheta and Batiai. There was a city called Thesprotia sharing the same name with the tribe itself.

== History ==
Thesprotis was inhabited by the tribe of the Thesprotians (Thesprōtoí, Θεσπρωτοί), one of the three most prominent tribes of Epirus, along with the Chaonians and the Molossians. The Thessalians who conquered Thessaly were considered to have originally come from Thesprotis. The Thesprotians are said to have been the strongest tribe in Epirus in the early times, before the power shifted during the Peloponnesian War, going to the Chaonians, and later to the Molossians. The tribe originally had its own king, but according to Thucydides, the kingship had been abandoned in his time, just like in Molossia. During the fourth century BCE, Thesprotis became part of the Epriote League, which in 330 BCE became a more unified state, the Epirote Kingdom. In the Roman period, Nicopolis, founded by Octavian in 31 BC, was the capital of the province of Epirus (and later Epirus Vetus), and it was located in Thesprotis.
