= Toryne =

Coordinates: 39°17′06″N 20°24′01″E

Epirus in antiquity

Toryne (Ancient Greek: Τορύνη), also known as Torone (Τορώνη), was a city of ancient Thesprotia in ancient Epirus. The fleet of Augustus was moored off Toryne a short time before the Battle of Actium, and seems from the order of the names in Ptolemy to have stood in one of the bays between the mouth of the river Thyamis and Sybota. It was located on the Ionian Sea coast, and its site is tentatively placed near present Parga.

In Shakespeare's Antony and Cleopatra Toryne is personally taken over by Caesar shortly after his being in Rome, showing an almost mystical speed. "Toryne" meant "ladle" in Ancient Greek, and in Plutarch's Life of Antony, Cleopatra puns upon this. In Victor Hugo's novel of the 1832 June Rebellion, Les Misérables, a character says: "Cleopatra’s pun preceded the battle of Actium, and that had it not been for it, no one would have remembered the city of Toryne".

== See also ==
- List of cities in ancient Epirus
