= Poionos =

Ancient Greek city in south-eastern Europe

Epirus in antiquity.

Poionos (Greek: Ποιωνός) was an ancient Greek city located in the region of Epirus but known only from a theorodokos inscription.

== See also ==
- List of cities in ancient Epirus

== Sources ==
- Hansen, Mogens Herman; Nielsen, Thomas Heine (2004). An Inventory of Archaic and Classical Poleis. Oxford and New York: Oxford University Press. ISBN 0198140991.
