= Plataria =

Plataria Πλαταριά
- Community
- Location within Greece
- Coordinates: 39°27′N 20°17′E
- Country: Greece
- Administrative region: Epirus
- Regional unit: Thesprotia
- Municipality: Igoumenitsa
- Municipal unit: Syvota

Population (2021)
  - Community: 907
- Time zone: UTC+2 (EET)
  - Summer (DST): UTC+3 (EEST)
- Vehicle registration: ΗΝ

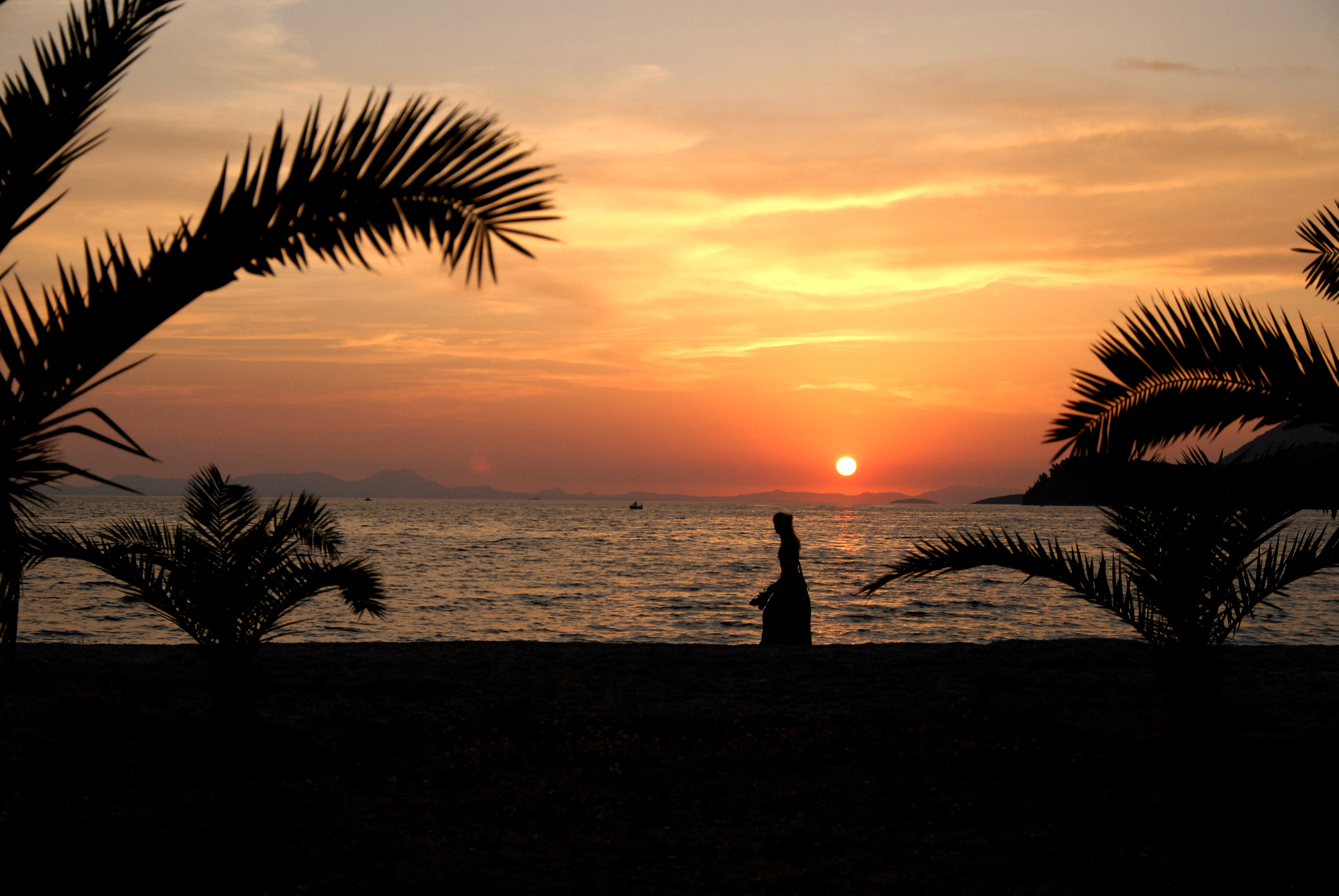
A beach in Plataria

Plataria (Greek: Πλαταριά, pronounced [plataˈrʝa]) is a coastal village and resort in Thesprotia, Epirus region, Greece. It is part of the Syvota municipal unit.

Plataria was part of the former province of Thyamida. It is located south of Igoumenitsa in the homonymous bay. According to the last administrative division (Kallikratis scheme) Plataria is the seat of the municipal unit of Syvota of the municipality of Igoumenitsa. Its population in 1928 was 128 inhabitants and in 2011 it numbered 961 inhabitants. Since 1930 Plataria has a high school.

The Chams of Plataria (Albanian: Pllatare) were designated by Greece for expulsion to Turkey in 1925. Albania protested against the plan in the League of Nations. By 1926, there were 5 Greek families from Turkey in Plataria.

Plataria is a tourist destination located along the Plataria Bay, which extends near the start of Egnatia Highway and terminates close to Syvota.

There are two versions regarding the origin of the name “Plataria”: 1) The first version is that Plataria is named as such because of the presence of the plain area. In Greek, «πλατύ» means plain area, hence “Πλαταριά». 2) The second version is that Plataria was named after an old large plane tree («πλάτανος» in Greek), which exists today and a small portion of it is still preserved.

Plataria is known for its cultural heritage and features are many organizations and institutes, amongst which the Folklore Museum of Plataria and the Lending Library of Plataria, which operate under the auspices of the Cultural Union of Plataria.

== Sources ==
- Baltsiotis, Lambros (2009). The Muslim Chams from their entry into the Greek state until the start of the Greco-Italian war (1913-1940): the story of a community from millet to nation [Οι μουσουλμάνοι Τσάμηδες από την είσοδό τους στο ελληνικό κράτος μέχρι την έναρξη του ελληνοϊταλικού πολέμου (1913-1940): η ιστορία μιας κοινότητας από το millet στο έθνος] (Thesis). University of Panteion.
