= Kastritsa =

Kastritsa Καστρίτσα
- Community
- Location within Greece
- Coordinates: 39°37.9′N 20°55.3′E
- Country: Greece
- Administrative region: Epirus
- Regional unit: Ioannina
- Municipality: Ioannina
- Municipal unit: Pamvotida

Population (2021)
  - Community: 568
- Time zone: UTC+2 (EET)
  - Summer (DST): UTC+3 (EEST)
- Vehicle registration: ΙΝ

Kastritsa (Greek: Καστρίτσα, before 1927: Μπαρκμάδι - Barkmadi) is a village in the municipal unit of Pamvotida, Ioannina regional unit in Greece. It is situated on a hillside near the southern shore of Lake Ioannina. It is situated 2 km southwest of Vasiliki, 3 km east of Katsikas and 7 km southeast of Ioannina. The A2 motorway (Alexandroupoli - Thessaloniki - Ioannina - Igoumenitsa) passes south of the village.

== Name ==
Until 1927 the village was named Barkoumadi or Barkmadi (Greek: Μπαρκουμάδι or Μπαρκμάδι), after the Albanian words bark and madh literally meaning big belly and metaphorically "the good eater". In 1927 it was renamed to Kastritsa after the ruins of a castle located near the village.

== Population ==
Historical population
Year	Pop.	±%
1981	754	—
1991	747	−0.9%
2001	671	−10.2%
2011	557	−17.0%
2021	568	+2.0%

== Archaeology ==
Epirus in antiquity

Artifacts found in the vicinity are believed to demonstrate a human presence in the village from the Neolithic age until historic times.

The site of ancient Tecmon is conjectured as being at Kastritsa or that of Eurymenai (Epirus).

West of the village is the height Kastritsa which is rich in artifacts. At the elevation, the following have been found:

On the west bank, there is a cave with evidence of occupation dating back to around 20,000 and 10,000 years ago, the new period of the Paleolithic age in Greece. The cave was reported by English archeologists in 1967. In the north side, another cave with paintings from the late Neolithic age. On the foot of the location, it has a tomb of the Late Helladic period.

East of the village a settlement has been found in 1948-49, which was reported by S. Dakaris in 1951-52. Artifacts (tombs, ceramic) showed it was settled from the Neolithic age until the historic years. North of the hill features the ancient Acropolis Tekmon (Τέκμον) which used the ancient art with a perimeter of about 3,000 m with 5 entrances, the central entrance is in the northeastern side of the hill.

== See also ==
- List of settlements in the Ioannina regional unit
