= Necromanteion of Acheron =

Ancient Greek temple of necromancy

Coordinates: 39.2362°N 20.5345°E

The Nekromanteion (Greek: Νεκρομαντεῖον) was an ancient Greek temple of necromancy devoted to Hades and Persephone. According to tradition, it was located on the banks of the Acheron river in Epirus, near the ancient city of Ephyra. This site was believed by devotees to be the door to Hades, the realm of the dead. The site is at the meeting point of the Acheron, Pyriphlegethon and Cocytus rivers, believed to flow through and water the kingdom of Hades. The meaning of the names of the rivers has been interpreted to be "joyless", "burning coals" and "lament", respectively.

A site in Mesopotamos, Epirus was proposed as the site of the Necromanteion in 1958, but this identification is now questioned.

== Background ==
The word Necromanteion means "Oracle of the Dead", and the faithful came here to talk with their dead ancestors. Although other ancient temples such as the Temple of Poseidon in Taenaron as well as those in Argolis, Cumae, and Herakleia in Pontos are known to have housed oracles of the dead, the Necromanteion of Ephyra was the most important. It belonged to the Thesprotians, the local Epirot Greek tribe. According to Herodotus' account, it was to the Necromanteion that Periander, the 6th century BC tyrant of Corinth, sent legates to ask questions of his dead wife, Melissa. In Homer's Odyssey, the Necromanteion was also described as the entrance by which Odysseus made his katabasis or journey to the underworld.

== Ritual use ==
Ritual use of the Necromanteion involved elaborate ceremonies wherein celebrants seeking to speak to the dead would start by gathering in the ziggurat-like temple and consuming a meal of broad beans, pork, barley bread, oysters, and a narcotic compound. Following a cleansing ceremony and the sacrifice of sheep, the faithful would descend through a chthonic series of meandering corridors leaving offerings as they passed through a number of iron gates. The nekromanteia would pose a series of questions and chant prayers and the celebrants would then witness the priest arise from the floor and begin to fly through the temple through the use of theatrical cranes.

== Disputed archaeological site ==
An archaeological site discovered in 1958 and excavated during 1958–64 and 1976–77 was identified as the Necromanteion by archaeologist Sotirios Dakaris based on its geographical location and its similarities to descriptions found in Herodotus and Homer. However, its topographical situation on a hill commanding the immediate neighbourhood does not fit this interpretation and the ruins dated to no earlier than the later 4th century BC.

It is now also believed that the site was a fortified farmhouse of a sort common in the Hellenistic period. Besides quantities of household ceramics, the site produced agricultural tools and weaponry, including Roman pila from the final destruction of the site by the Romans in 167 BC. Most surprising of all were 21 washers (the distinctive bronze modioli) from at least seven different catapults, which Dakaris had mistakenly identified as components from a crane.

=== Timeline ===
- 8th century BC – Necromanteion described by Homer.
- 5th century BC – Necromanteion described by Herodotus.
- Late 4th century BC – Site building erected.
- 167 BC – Site burned down by the Romans.
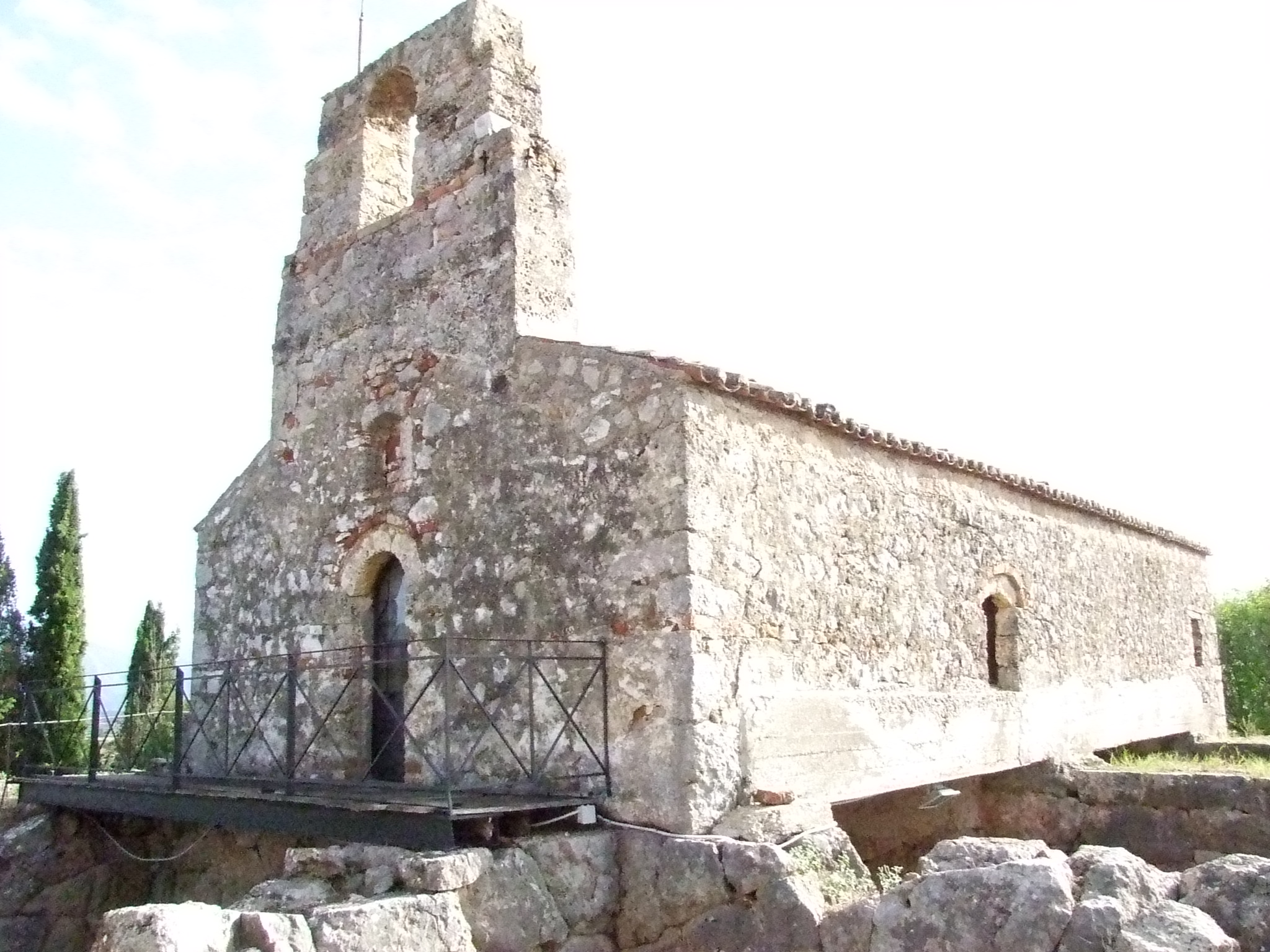

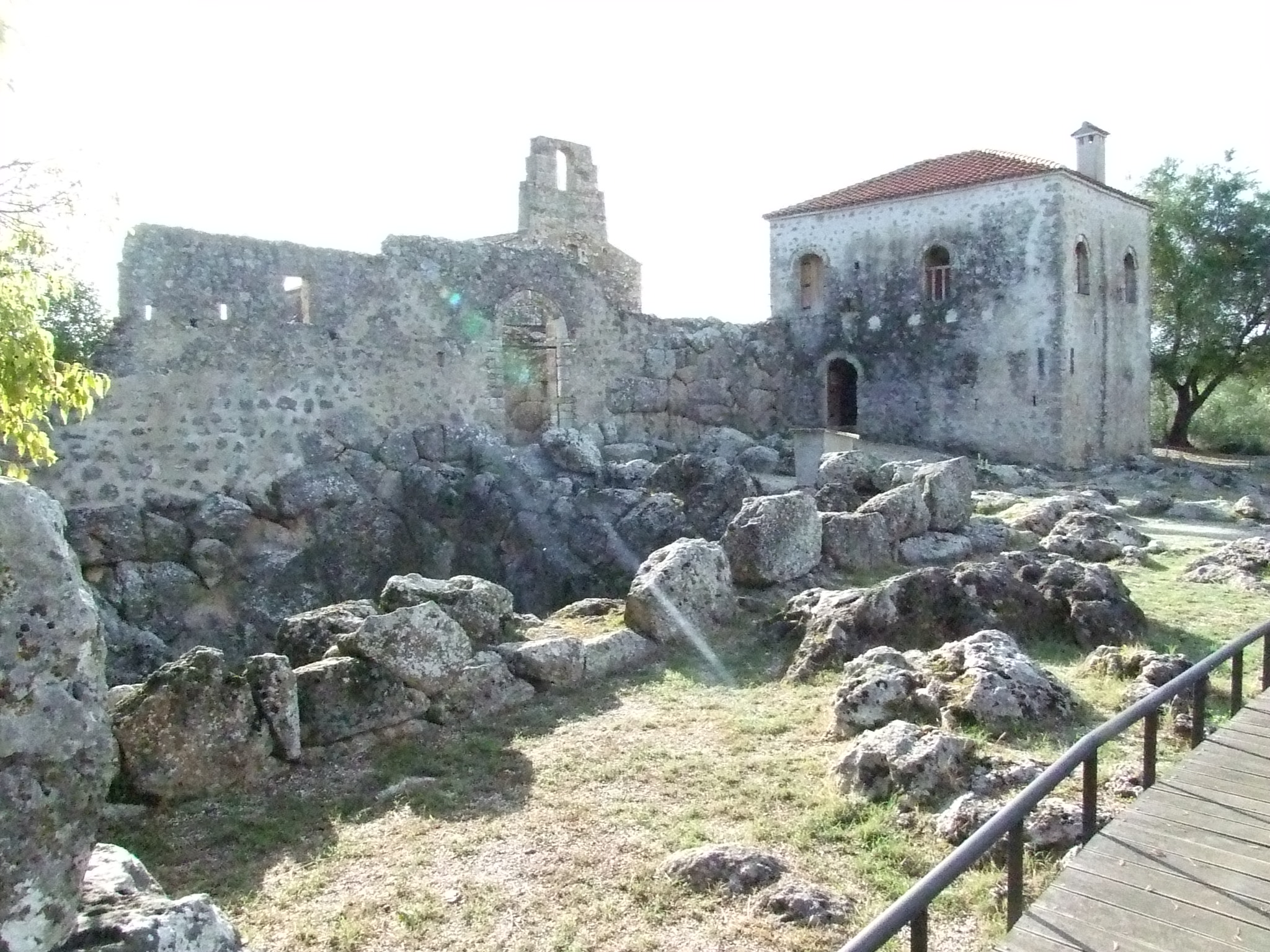

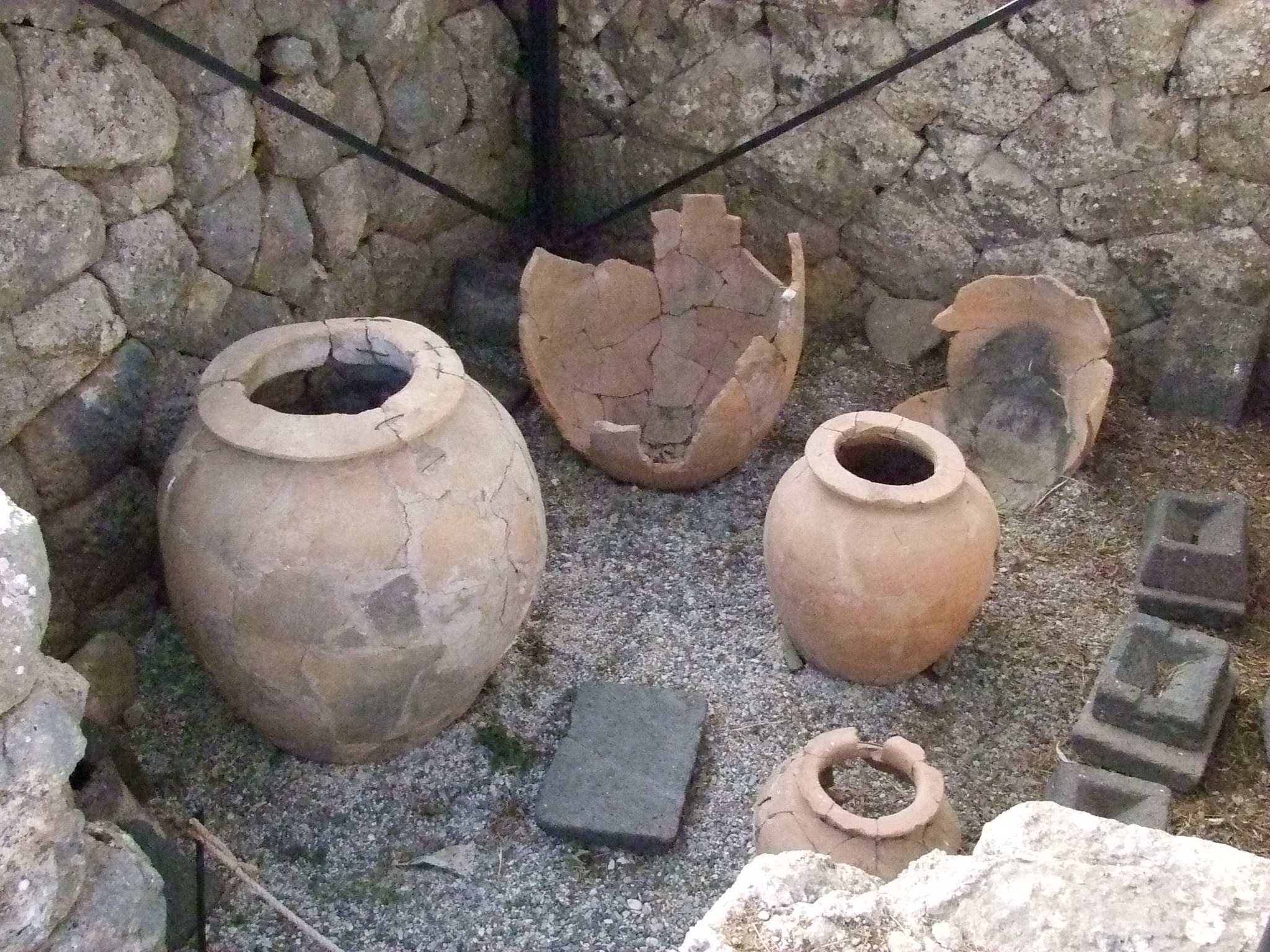
Pottery at the Necromanteion

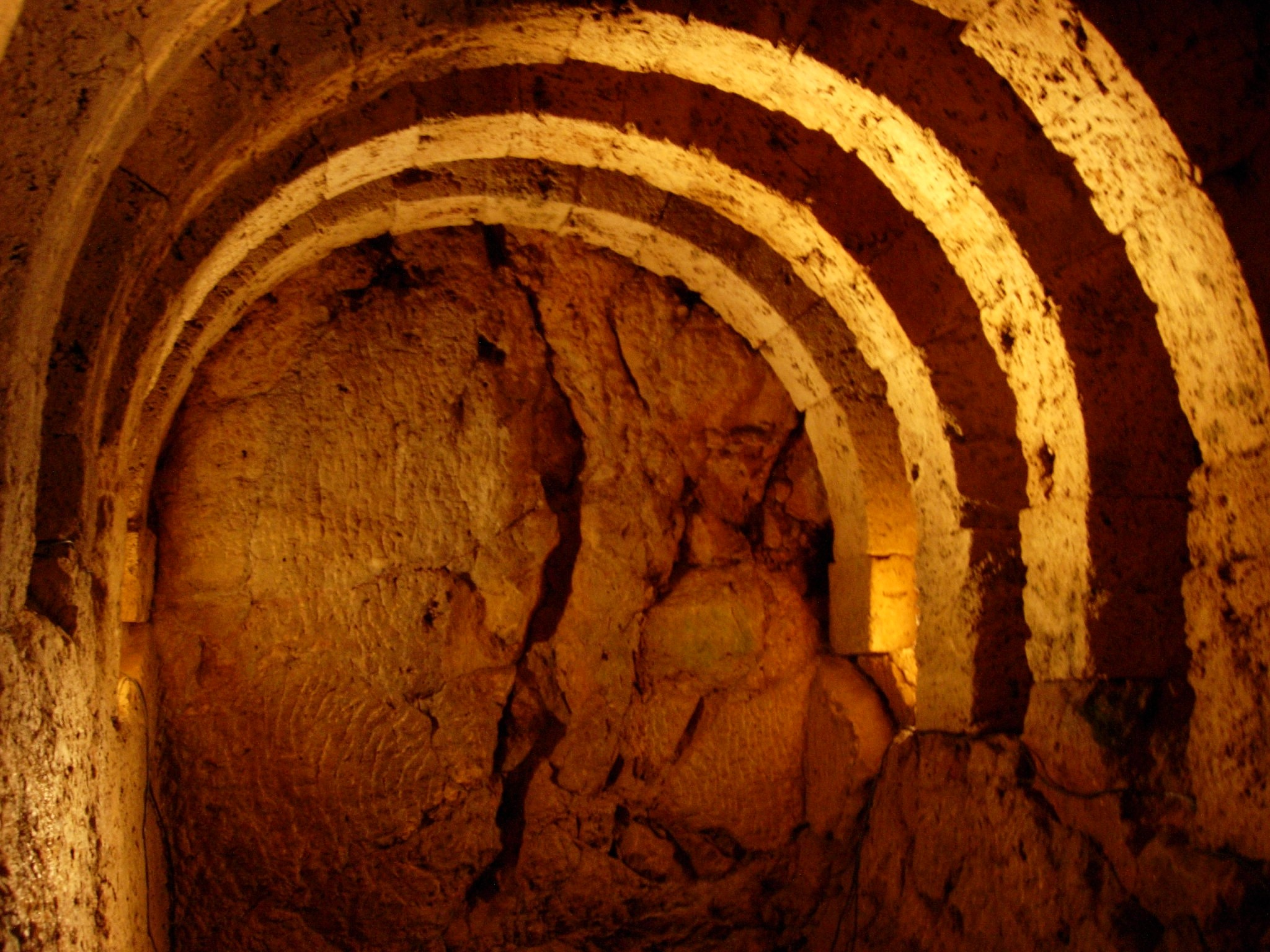
One of the tunnels on the site

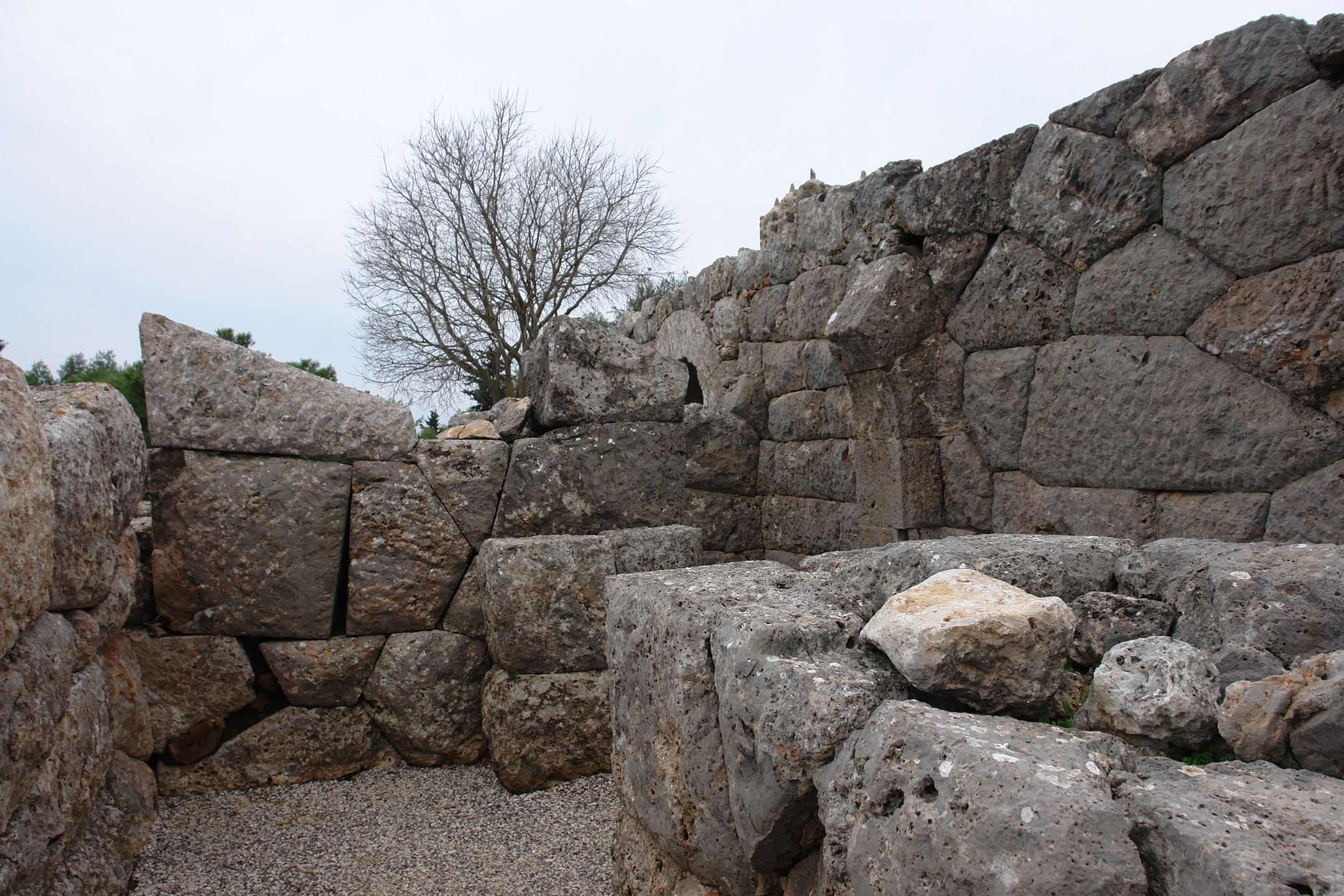
Halls leading to the central room

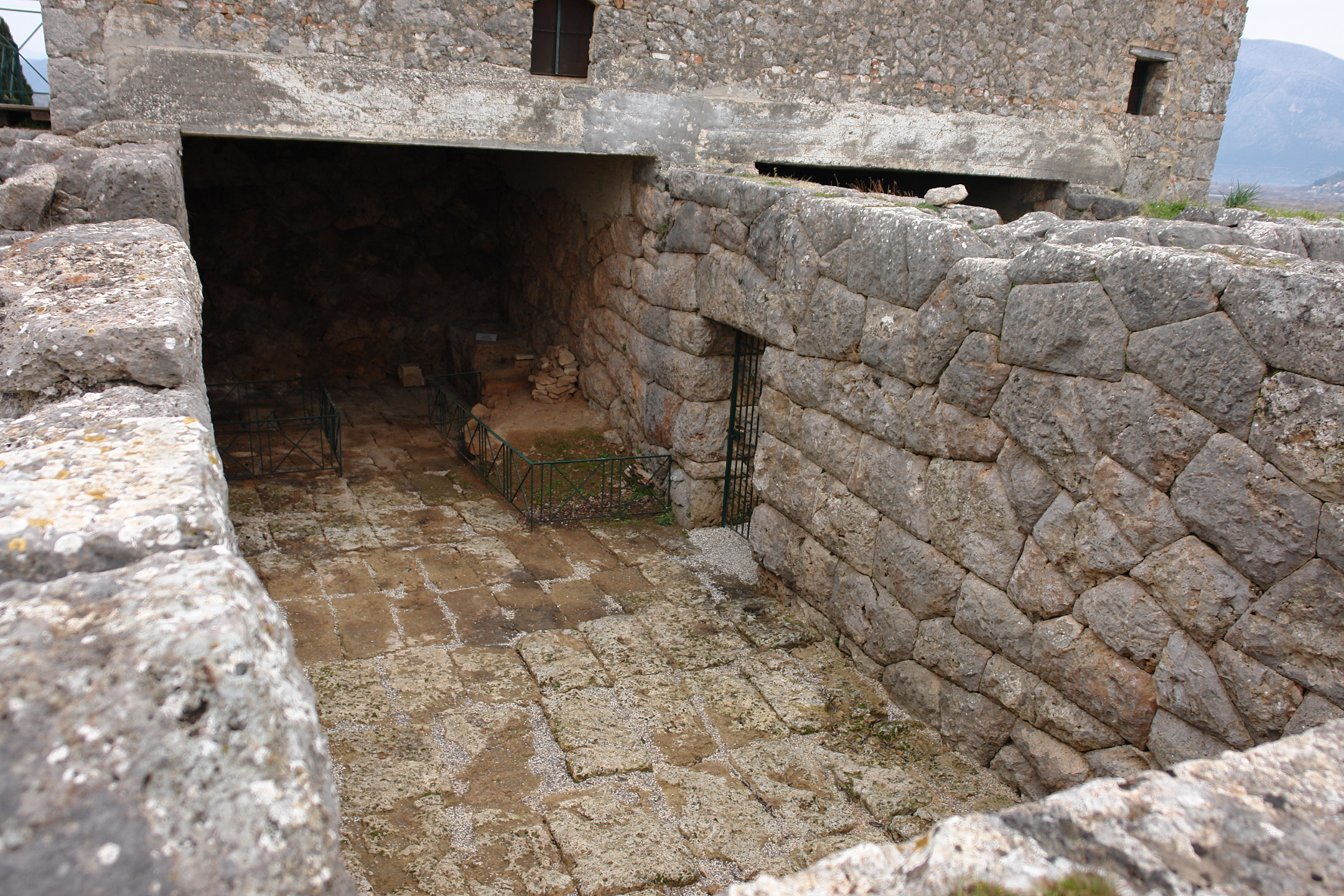
Central room

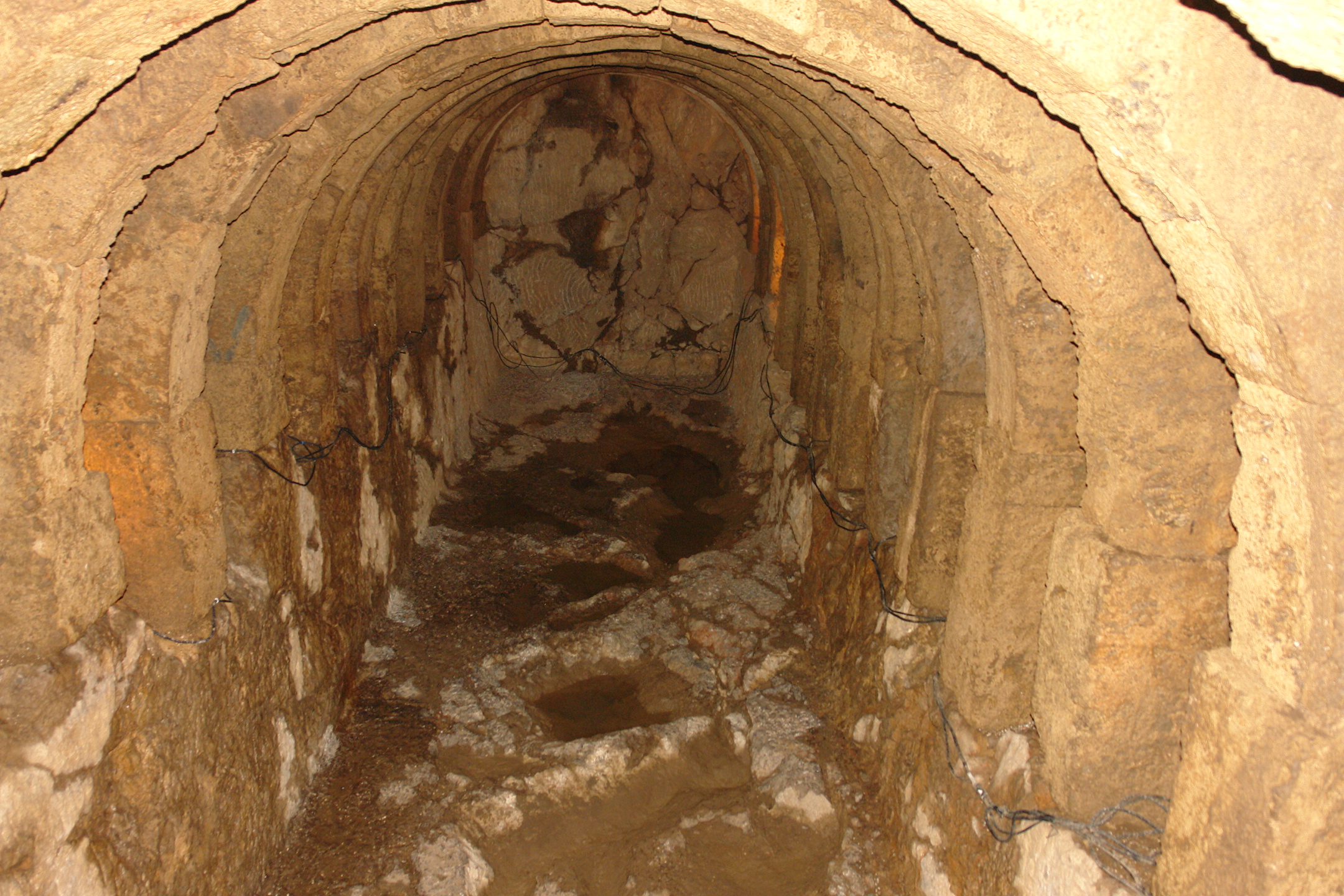
Tunnel
