= Helicranon =

Ancient Greek city in Epirus

Coordinates: 39°49′47″N 20°36′53″E

Epirus in antiquity.

Helicranon or Helikranon (Ancient Greek: Ἑλίκρανον) was an ancient Greek city located in the region of Epirus. The site of the city is tentatively located near modern Chrysorrachi.

== See also ==
- List of cities in ancient Epirus

== Sources ==
- Åhlfeldt, Johan (2019). "Digital Atlas of the Roman Empire (DARE)". University of Gothenburg: Centre for Digital Humanities.
- Hansen, Mogens Herman; Nielsen, Thomas Heine (2004). An Inventory of Archaic and Classical Poleis. Oxford and New York: Oxford University Press. ISBN 0198140991.
- Talbert, Richard, ed. (2000). Barrington Atlas of the Greek and Roman World. Princeton, NJ: Princeton University Press.
