= Artichia =

Artichia (Greek: Αρτιχία) was an ancient Greek city located in the region of Epirus. The site is probably located somewhere in ancient Parauaea, now in the Përmet basin.

== See also ==
- List of cities in ancient Epirus

== Sources ==
- Hansen, Mogens Herman; Nielsen, Thomas Heine (2004). An Inventory of Archaic and Classical Poleis. Oxford and New York: Oxford University Press. ISBN 0198140991.
