= Baiake =

Ancient Greek city in Epirus

Baiake (Ancient Greek: Βαιάκη) was an ancient Greek city located in the region of Epirus. It was mentioned by Hecataeus of Miletus in his writings. A past identification with Balliake, a settlement between Apollonia and Oricos mentioned by Strabo, has been rejected.

== See also ==
- List of cities in ancient Epirus

== Sources ==
- Hansen, Mogens Herman; Nielsen, Thomas Heine (2004). An Inventory of Archaic and Classical Poleis. Oxford and New York: Oxford University Press. ISBN 0198140991.
