= Oropos (Epirus) =

Epirus in antiquity

Oropos (Greek: Ορωπός) was an ancient Greek (i.e., pre-Hellenistic) walled settlement located in the region of Epirus. The settlement site is in modern-day Voulista Panaghia.

== See also ==
- List of cities in ancient Epirus

== Sources ==
- Hansen, Mogens Herman; Nielsen, Thomas Heine (2004). An Inventory of Archaic and Classical Poleis. Oxford and New York: Oxford University Press. ISBN 0198140991.
