= Trampya =

Epirus in antiquity

Trampya (Ancient Greek: Τραμπύα) was an ancient Greek city in the region of Epirus. Its site is unlocated, but near that of Bouneima.

Ancient sources state that Odysseus was honored in Trampya.

== See also ==
- List of cities in ancient Epirus

== Sources ==
- Hansen, Mogens Herman; Nielsen, Thomas Heine (2004). An Inventory of Archaic and Classical Poleis. Oxford and New York: Oxford University Press. ISBN 0198140991.
