= Berenice (Epirus) =

Ancient city in Epirus, Greece

Epirus in antiquity

Berenice or Berenike (Ancient Greek: Βερενίκη) was a Greek city in the region of ancient Epirus, near current Preveza. It was founded by Pyrrhus II of Epirus (r. 255–238 ВС). According to some sources the city was founded by Pyrrhus I of Epirus sometime following his return from Ptolemaic Egypt in c.297 BC - Plutarch states that, in honour of his mother-in-law, Berenike I, Pyrrhus had "built a city in the peninsula of Epirus, called Berenicis/Berenike

== See also ==
- List of cities in ancient Epirus
