= Horreum (Epirus) =

Coordinates: 39°16′16″N 20°55′31″E

Epirus in antiquity

Horreum or Orraon or Horraon (Ancient Greek: Ὄρραον) was a Greek city of ancient Epirus. Orraon is located on a hill by the Amvrakikos Gulf which is located in Northwestern Greece, to the west of Ammotopos. It guards the passage all the way down to the Ioannina Basin.

== History ==
Orraon was founded in the 4th century B.C. while Alcetas I was king. This was the period of the Classical period and Hellenistic period. In 167 BC the Romans destroyed Orraon, but it was rebuilt shortly afterward. The city of Orraon lasted for a short period of time. In 37 BC the town had one hundred houses, twelve streets, and a graveyard. Orraon was abandoned by its people. Its inhabitants were forced to settle in Nicopolis which is located in the southwestern part of Greece. The city of Nicopolis was founded by Augustus after his victory in the Battle of Actium. Horreum was mentioned by the historian Livy.

== Archaeology ==
In Orraon “most of the houses are still standing two stories high and the street plan is still visible". In the town plan twelve narrow parallel streets, in the north and south direction, cross two wider streets. By the way the streets run from an oblong town block, the insula, and fifteen meters wide. The settlement consisted of 100 houses, built of local limestone. One house occupies the full width of each insula. Some pieces of the houses still remain today. The main parts that are visible today are the stone the houses were made of, window frames, door frames, and a few more features of the house are still visible. Everybody in the town of Orraon used a cistern. The cistern was located near the main gate, which was located in the northeast part of town. The cistern was located in this area because it was the highest point of altitude in the city. They had a closure wall located around the cistern. They put the antae frame placed at the south wall of the tank, and the straight stairs at the northeastern corner of the tank. The stairs helped them to get to the bottom of the tank to clean it as well as get water out of the tank. The wall was built out of rectangular stones, and limestone. The wall was higher than the cistern to keep people from throwing trash into the tank.

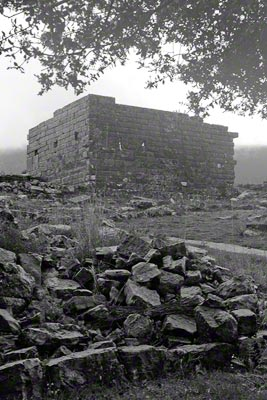
Molossians MG 3520

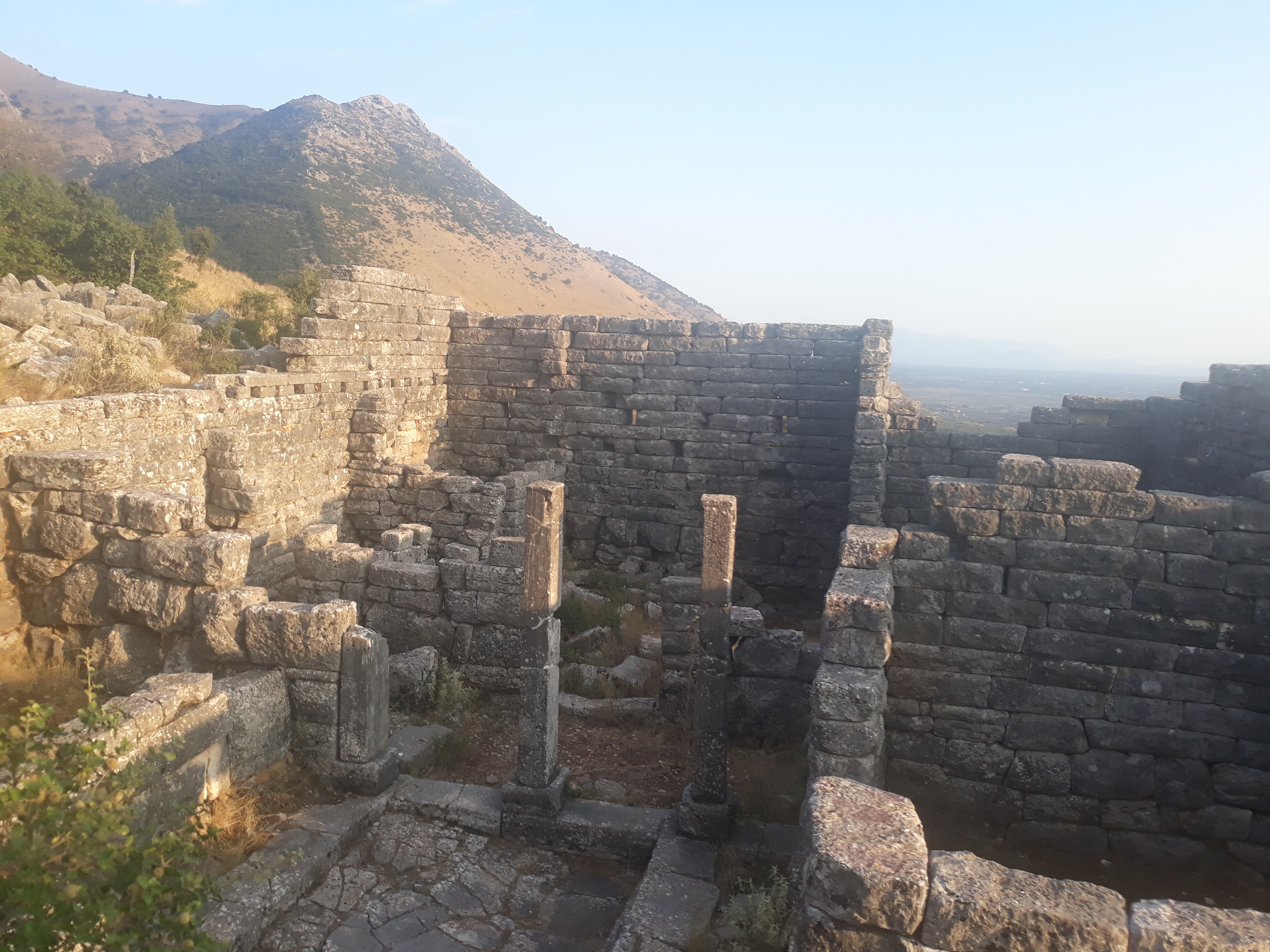
House in ancient Horreum

== Aftermath ==
Orraon is a very old historical place. It helped protect the Basin in Greece. It was destroyed by the Romans, but was built back very quickly. After being built back Orraon did not last much longer because the inhabitants were forced to leave because Augustus had won the battle of Actium’s. Some of the remains still remain today. The remains include the stones, some door frames, and windows that were left of the old homes. Some streets and roads are still visible today.

== See also ==
- List of cities in ancient Epirus
