= Pandosia (Epirus) =

Ancient city of Epirus

Coordinates: 39.2739°N 20.6869°E

Map of ancient Epirus

Pandosia (Ancient Greek: Πανδοσία) was an ancient Greek city of Epirus. Together with the other Elean colonies Bucheta and Elatea it was a city of the Cassopaeans, who were a sub-tribe of the Thesprotians. It was located south of the river Acheron.

== History ==
Very little is known about its history, save that Pandosia and its neighbours Bucheta and Elatea were conquered by Philip of Macedon. He transferred the cities to the possession of Alexander I of Epirus.

Alexander was allegedly warned by an oracle to beware of Pandosia and the Acheron river. When he left Epirus for a military campaign on the Italian Peninsula he thought himself to be safe, far away from the two places. He did not realize there was also a city called Pandosia and identically named river in Bruttium until it was too late. He was killed there during the Battle of Pandosia.

== Archaeology ==
In 1994, archaeological surveys were started on small number of fortified town sites in Southern Epirus. The modern village Kastri is most frequently identified as the site of the ancient city. The ruins of an acropolis can be seen on a hill near Kastri. This site 33 hectares (82 acres) occupies and was investigated with an archaeological survey in 1994. Over 85,000 artifacts were uncovered, more than 15,000 pottery sherds and more than 70,000 tile and brick fragments.

A definitive identification of this site as Pandosia has not been possible however, because Strabo described the city as situated to the south of the Acheron, but Kastri is just north of the river. This uncertainty has led to the suggestion that it might have been located much further inland at Gourana. Alternatively, the Acheron river might have changed its course over time to the south of the city.

== See also ==
- List of ancient Greek cities
- List of cities in ancient Epirus

== Sources ==
- Demosthenes (1930). Vince, J. H. (ed.). Orations. Vol. 1. Cambridge, Massachusetts: Harvard University Press. ISBN 978-0-674-99263-4.
- Strabo (1924). Jones, H. L. (ed.). Geography. Vol. 3. Cambridge, Massachusetts: Harvard University Press. ISBN 978-0-674-99201-6.
- Wiseman, James; Zachos, Kōnstantinos (2003). Landscape Archaeology in Southern Epirus, Greece. Vol. 1. American School of Classical Studies at Athens. ISBN 978-0-876-61532-4.
