= Elaeatis =

Coordinates: 39°15′N 20°30′E

Elaeatis or Elaiatis (Ancient Greek: Ἐλαιᾶτις) is the name of a district of ancient Epirus about the mouth of the Acheron river. The district is mentioned by Thucydides. Its chief town was Elaea.
