= Bouneima =

Epirus in antiquity

Bouneima (Greek: Βούνειμα) was an ancient Greek city in the region of Macedonia (region), Tymphaea, said to have been founded by Odysseus, near Trampya.

== See also ==
- List of cities in ancient Macedonia
