= Chrysavgi =

Chrysavgi Χρυσαυγή
- Community
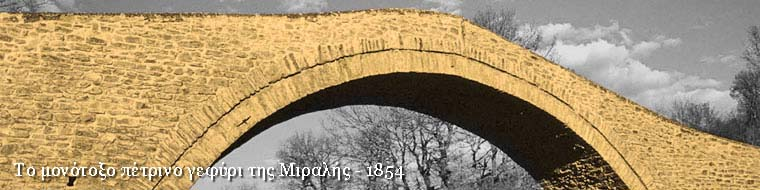
- Mirali Bridge

- Location within Greece
- Coordinates: 40°10′08″N 21°13′16″E
- Country: Greece
- Administrative region: Western Macedonia
- Regional unit: Kozani
- Municipality: Voio
- Municipal unit: Tsotyli

Population (2021)
  - Community: 32
- Time zone: UTC+2 (EET)
  - Summer (DST): UTC+3 (EEST)

Chrysavgi (Greek: Χρυσαυγή, before 1927: Μοιραλή – Moirali, between 1927 and 1930: Στρογγυλόν – Strongylon), is a mountain village in the municipality of Voio, Western Macedonia, Greece. Only 30 minutes from Grevena and 20 minutes from Tsotyli, it is built with traditional architecture at an altitude of 860 meters. The stone houses give a special and impressive picture.

== History ==
The exact establishment date is difficult to pinpoint due to lack of historical evidences. The older register is from the 1534 codex in the Monastery of Zaborda and gives the old name of the village which was Mirali, a name taken probably from the Turkish commander of the area, Omer Ali. At 1927 it was renamed Stroggylon (which means round) and in 1930 received its final name Chrysavgi (which means “golden dawn”)

South of the village lay the stony remains of an ancient military settlement which was used to control the mountain passes. A copper statue of Athena was found in the area, along with metallic vessels, spearheads and daggers. Also Greek, Roman and Byzantine coins were unearthed by farmers.

The first settlers, according to tradition, were located at "Selio" point, 2 kilometers north of the village. In the area were scattered settlements which were destroyed by Turkish and Albanian raids. The remaining people established the modern village.

In 1793 many Voio villages were Islamized and became manors of the local Beys who were friendly to Ali Pasha. At Chrysavgi the Bey was Ali Koukos, to whom the residents paid the protective tax, one tenth of their production (Dekati). Beside the tax, they were bound to hand over to the Bey each new bride for him to spend the first wedding night with (Ius primae noctis). Some villagers were unable to tolerate this custom and killed the Bey in 1830. Next day was considered to be a "Golden Dawn" for the village. The remains of the Bey were discovered during an excavation in 1962, in "Koukos" point. The retaliation of the Turks for the murder of the Bey was a heavy tax enforced on the village. With this money, a mosque was built in Constantinople (Istanbul) which was named "Mirali Tzamisi".

Chrysavgi and the other villages ceased to be manors in 1836 after a firman from Sultan Mahmud II.
