= Syvota =

Village in Thesprotia, Greece

Syvota Σύβοτα
- Municipal unit
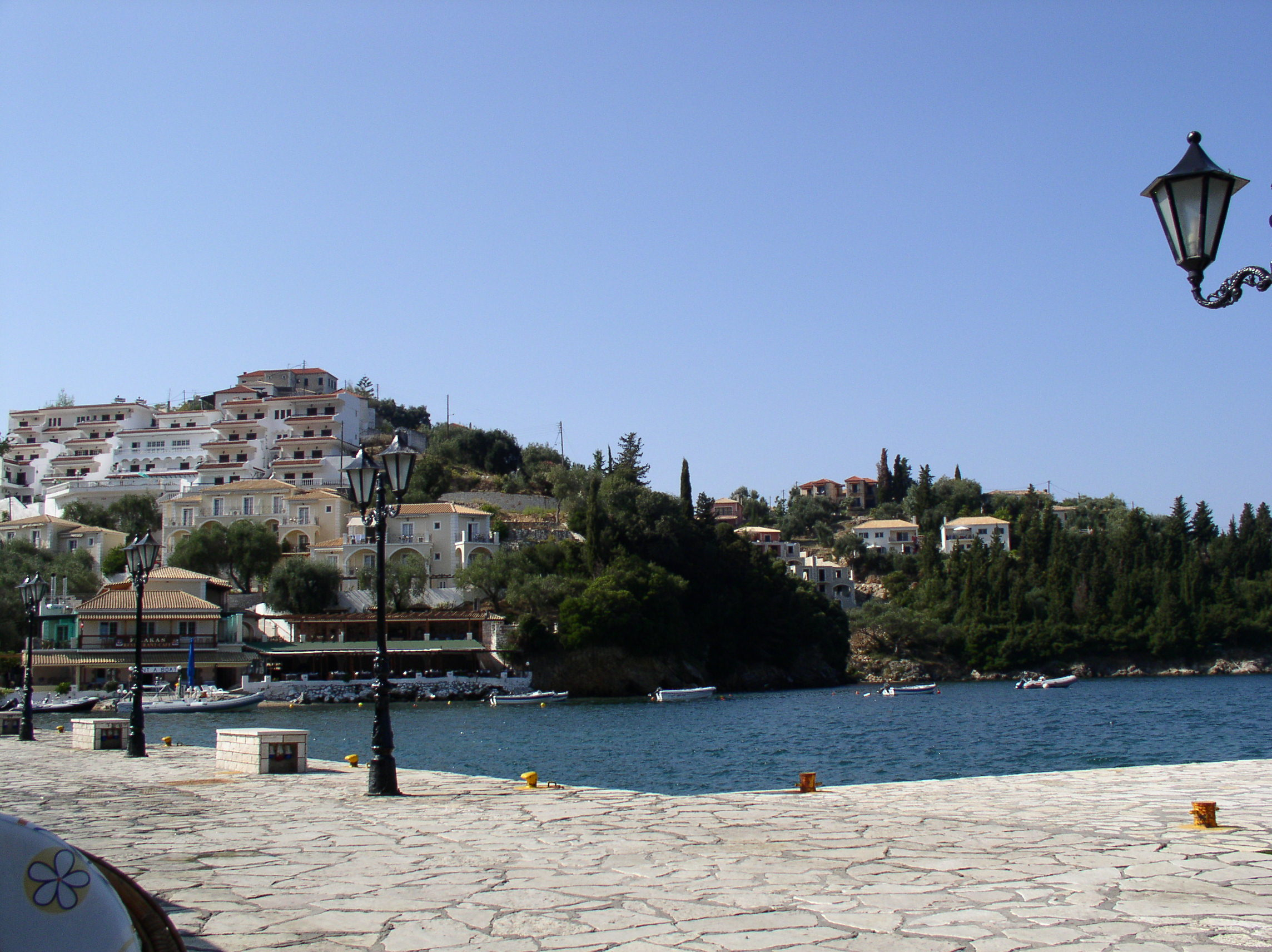
- View of Syvota.

- Location within the regional unit

- Location within Greece
- Coordinates: 39°24′N 20°15′E
- Country: Greece
- Administrative region: Epirus
- Regional unit: Thesprotia
- Municipality: Igoumenitsa

Area
  - Municipal unit: 72.4 km^{2} (28.0 sq mi)

Population (2021)
  - Municipal unit: 2,693
  - Municipal unit density: 37.2/km^{2} (96.3/sq mi)
  - Community: 1,089
- Time zone: UTC+2 (EET)
  - Summer (DST): UTC+3 (EEST)
- Vehicle registration: ΗΝ

Syvota (Greek: Σύβοτα, pronounced [ˈsivota], before 1927: Βώλια - Volia, 1927-1940: Μούρτος - Mourtos) is a village and a former municipality in Thesprotia, Epirus, Greece. Since the 2011 local government reform it is part of the municipality Igoumenitsa, of which it is a municipal unit. The municipal unit has an area of 72.439 km^{2}. The population in 2021 was 1,089 for the village, and 2,693 for the municipal unit. The municipal unit has four main settlements: Syvota, Argyrotopos, Faskomilia, and Plataria. The seat of the municipality was in Plataria.

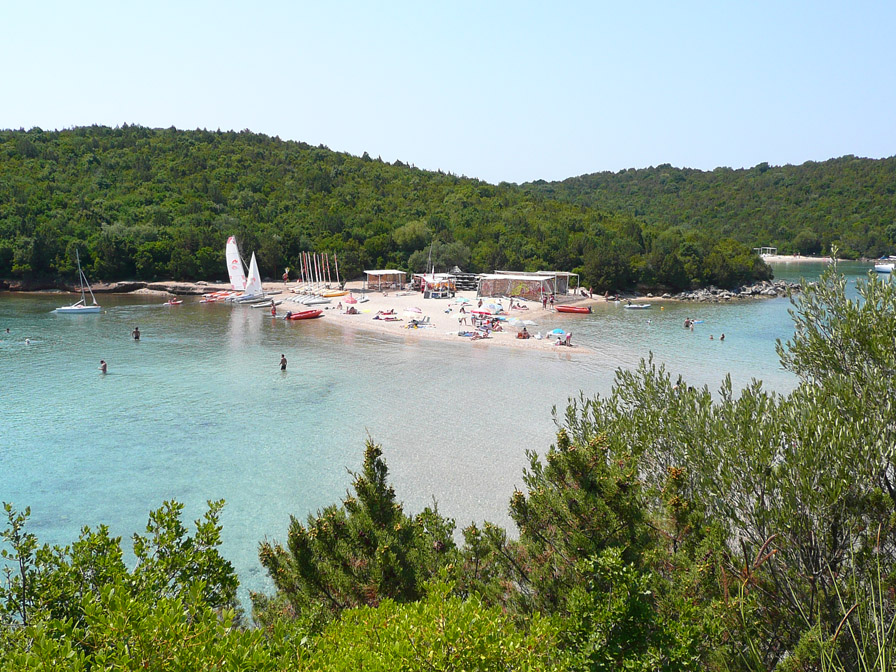
Bella Vraka beach in Syvota.

== History ==
The earliest recorded inhabitants of the region are the Thesprotians, a Greek tribe of Epirus. In antiquity, the location was called Sybota and was the site of the Battle of Sybota. During the Middle Ages, Syvota, like the rest of Epirus, was part of the Byzantine Empire and the Despotate of Epirus, the Republic of Venice and in the 15th century it became part of the Ottoman Empire. The first local Muslims of Syvota are recorded in Arvenitsa and Nista as early as 1613.

It became part of Greece in 1913, following the Balkan Wars, and was previously used as an Ottoman naval base during the Greek War of Independence.

Like all other Muslim Cham Albanian communities, the population was affected by the annexation of the region by Greece and many left the area. In 1913, the population of Arvenitsa (Albanian: Arvenicë) dropped from 439 to 389, Mourtos (Albanian: Murto or Vola) from 970 to 659 and Nista (Albanian: Nistë) from 511 to 358. The Chams of Plataria (Albanian: Pllatare) were designated by Greece for expulsion to Turkey in 1925. Albania protested against the plan in the League of Nations. A further wave of emigration towards Turkey is documented in Mourtos in 1932 and Arvenitsa (renamed to Argyrotopos in 1928) in 1934. Greece settled Greek Orthodox refugees from Turkey in Mourtos after 1922, following the Population exchange between Greece and Turkey. By 1926, there were 30 refugee families from Turkey in Arvenitsa, 90 in Nista, 5 in Plataria, 150 in Mourtos. Albanian was taught again for Albanian children in the region in Nista (renamed to Faskomilia in 1928) as of 1936.

The Chams of Syvota lived in the village until 1944, when they were expelled for collaborating with the Axis Powers. During the short term Italian occupation in Syvota (early November 1940) the village was burnt by Cham Albanian bands and Italian troops.

In Polyneri (Albanian: Kuç, renamed to Polyneri in 1955), a tiny Muslim Cham community resides, and until recently, the last imam in Epirus lived in this village. The mosque was blown up by a Christian villager during the Regime of the Colonels.

Today, Syvota town is a well-developed resort, owing largely to the numerous pristine beaches with clear waters located on several islets immediately offshore.

== Population ==
Historical population
Year	Pop.	±%
1895	1,066	—
1913	970	−9.0%
1928	679	−30.0%
1940	883	+30.0%
1951	241	−72.7%
1961	684	+183.8%
1971	560	−18.1%
1981	575	+2.7%
1991	756	+31.5%
2001	887	+17.3%
2011	875	−1.4%
2021	1,089	+24.5%

== See also ==
- Battle of Sybota

== Sources ==
- Balta, Evangelia; Oğuz, Mustafa; Yaşar, Filiz (2011). "Εthnic and Religious Composition of Ottoman Thesprotia in the 15th to 17th centuries". In Forsén, Björn; Tikkala, Esko (eds.). Thesprotia Expedition II. Environment and Settlement Patterns. Foundation of the Finnish Institute at Athens. ISBN 978-952-67211-2-5.
- Baltsiotis, Lambros (2009). The Muslim Chams from their entry into the Greek state until the start of the Greco-Italian war (1913-1940): the story of a community from millet to nation [Οι μουσουλμάνοι Τσάμηδες από την είσοδό τους στο ελληνικό κράτος μέχρι την έναρξη του ελληνοϊταλικού πολέμου (1913–1940): η ιστορία μιας κοινότητας από το millet στο έθνος] (Thesis). University of Panteion.
- Isufi, Hajredin (2002). Musa Demi dhe qëndresa çame: 1800-1947. Botime Dudaj. ISBN 9992750103.
