= Tecmon =

Tecmon or Tekmon (Ancient Greek: Τέκμων) was a city of Molossis in ancient Epirus, incorrectly called by Stephanus of Byzantium a city of Thesprotia, taken by Lucius Anicius Gallus, the Roman commander, in 167 BCE.

Its site is unlocated.
