= Cichyrus =

Capital of ancient Thesprotia

Coordinates: 39°14′33″N 20°31′53″E

Epirus in antiquity

Cichyrus (Ancient Greek: Κίχυρος, Kichyros), earlier called Ephyra (Ἐφύρα or Ἐφύρη), was the capital of ancient Thesprotia, according to the myth built by the Arcadian leader Thesprotos. Thucydides describes it as situated in the district Elaeatis in Thesprotia, away from the sea. At its site is the famous Necromanteion (Νεκρομαντεῖον, "Oracle of the Dead"). First settled during the Bronze Age and resettled in the 14th century BC by colonists most probably from Chaonia and the west Peloponnese region, the city is about 800 m north of the junction of the Kokytos River with the Acheron, and about 4.5 km east of the bay of Ammoudia. Near it was the outlet into the sea of the Acherusian Lake. Strabo (7.7.5) gives the same information and adds that in his time Ephyra was called Kichyros. The name had been changed from Ephyra back to the more ancient name about 200 years earlier.

== Mythology ==
According to legend, Cichyrus was named after – and founded on – the spot where Cichyrus, the son of the Chaonian king, died after falling from his horse into a ravine. He had been overcome by the shock and stress of accidentally killing a girl named Anthippe, while hunting a leopard that had hidden in the same bush as Anthippe and her lover.

In Greek mythology, Neoptolemos was said to have landed at Kichyros (Ephyra) on his return from Troy (Pind. Nem. 7.37-39) and Odysseus went there earlier, before leaving for Troy (Od. 1 .210-211) to get poison for his arrows (Od. 1 .259f). Theseus and Perithoos came to snatch away Persephone, wife of Aidoneus, King of Ephyra. These were none other than Persephone and Hades, the gods of the underworld, who had a shrine and an oracle at Ephyra. Heracles subjugated Ephyra and fathered a child by Princess Astyoche, Tlepolemus, who became king of Rhodes. Thyestes came there looking for his brother, Atreus. Atreus was not there, but the daughter of Thyestes, Pelopia, was there, and Thyestes, not recognizing her, took her as a wife. Their union produced Aegisthus.

== History ==
The Thesprotian Kichyros/Ephyra appears to be the town mentioned in two passages of the Odyssey (i. 259, ii. 328). The Ephyri, mentioned in a passage of the Iliad (xiii. 301), were supposed by Pausanias to be the Thesprotians inhabitants of the town. but Strabo maintained that the poet referred to the Thessalian Ephyra (Strab. ix. p. 442). Some commentators even supposed the Ephyra on the Selleeis to be the Thesprotian town, but Strabo expressly maintains that Homer alludes in these passages to the Eleian town. Pausanias represents Cichyrus as the capital of the ancient kings of Thesprotia, where Theseus and Peirithous were thrown into chains by Aidoneus; and its celebrity in the most ancient times may also be inferred from a passage of Pindar.

== Information on the location ==
The site of Ephyra is confirmed by the excavation of the ancient oracle of the dead, Necromanteion, on the hill of Agios Ioannis near the village of Mesopotamo, 150 m north of the junction of the Kokytos with the Acheron. The remains of three ancient wall circuits are preserved on the limestone nearby hill of Xylokastro. The finds within the acropolis, chiefly sherds of local pottery of the Bronze Age and Mycenaean sherds, together with the worship of the chthonic goddess Persephone. After the surrender of the Elean colonies in Kassopaia to Philip II of Macedon in 343-342 BC, (Dem. 7.32) and their subjection to the Thesprotians, Ephyra appears to have reverted to its original name, Kichyros, which had been kept alive in some neighboring Thesprotian settlement. Some finds, chiefly pottery of the 1st century BC, confirm the statement of Pausanias (1.17.5) that Kichyros was in existence in his time.

== Archaeology ==
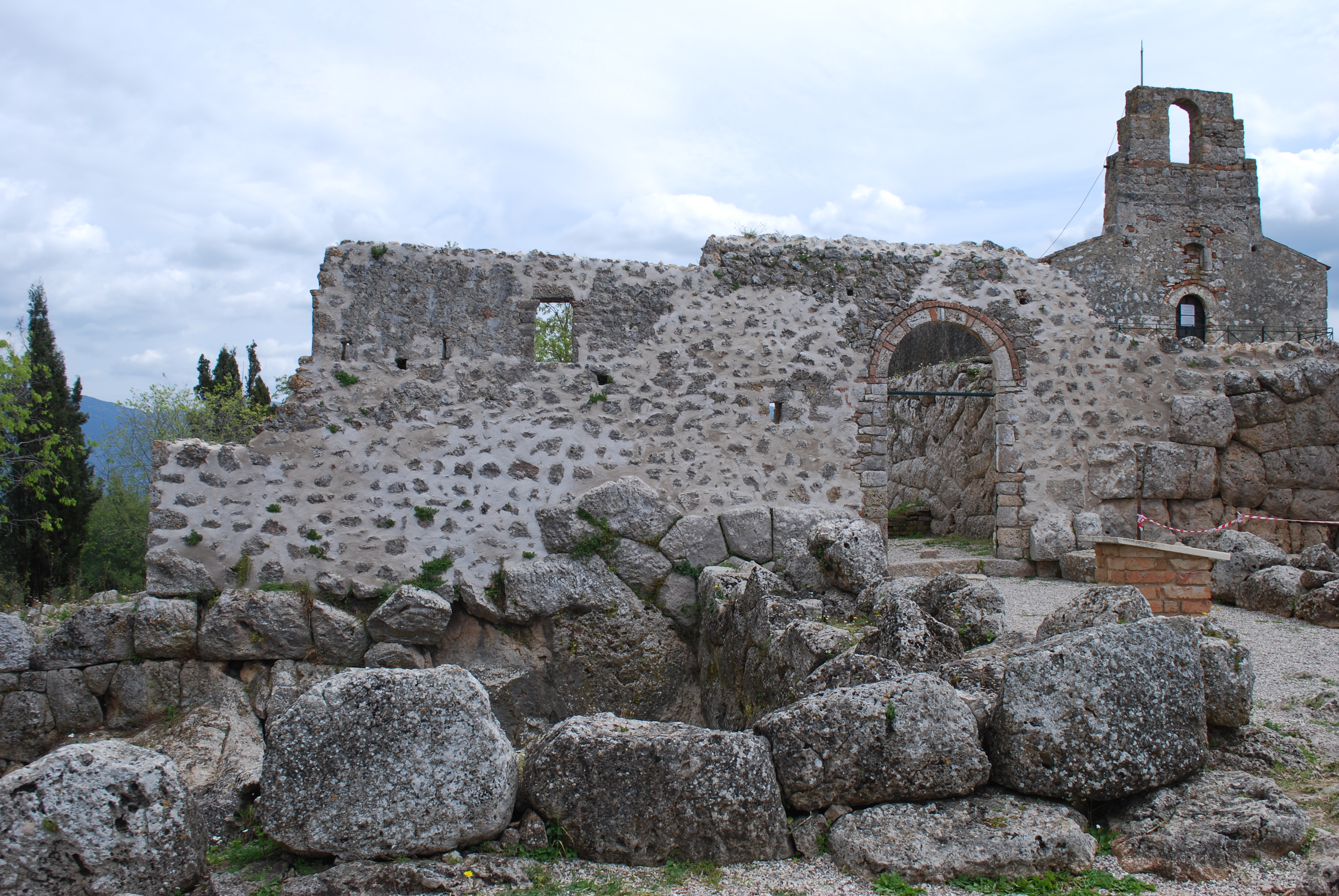
Part of the remains of Necromanteion, with the church of the monastery Agios Ioannis in the background on the right.

The remains of the ancient Ephira are near the present Ioannina. In the period between 1958 and 1987, several excavations were conducted by a team from the University of Ioannina that were later expanded between 2006 and 2008. In them, archaeologists found remains of the only Mycenaean acropolis whose existence has been confirmed within the region of Epirus. Two of the three walls of the fortification that were found in the southern part of the acropolis, were built in stone with Cyclopean style in the fourteenth or early thirteenth century BC, while the third is much later, of the Hellenistic period. On the other hand, on a plateau on the western side of the acropolis, three large funerary burial mounds of the 12th century BC have been found.

== See also ==
- List of ancient Greek cities
- List of cities in ancient Epirus
