= Chyton =

Epirus in antiquity

Chyton, according to Ephorus, was a new city founded in Epirus during the 4th century BC. The city was established by Ionians from Klazomenai.

Its site is unlocated.

== See also ==
- List of cities in ancient Epirus
