= Cheimerium =

Fortified settlement and harbour in ancient Epirus

Coordinates: 39°17′03″N 20°20′29″E

Epirus in antiquity

Cheimerium or Cheimerion (Ancient Greek: Χειμέριον) was a fortified settlement and harbour of ancient Thesprotia in ancient Epirus, on an eponymous promontory. It lay between the rivers Acheron and Thyamis, and opposite the southern point of Corcyra. In the two naval engagements between the Corcyraeans and Corinthians just before the Peloponnesian War, Cheimerium was the station of the Corinthian fleet.

It is located in modern near Akra Trophale, Stikgia, 5 km from Cichyrus (Ephyra). Its acropolis was fortified since the archaic period.

== See also ==
- List of cities in ancient Epirus
