= Batiae =

Ancient Greek city in the region of Epirus

Coordinates: 39°13′41″N 20°49′21″E

Epirus in antiquity

Batiae or Batiai (Ancient Greek: Βατίαι), also known as Bitia (Βιτία), was an ancient Greek city located in the region of Epirus. It was located in Thesprotia, mentioned along with Elateia, and situated in the interior in the neighbourhood of Pandosia. The city-site is located near modern Kastri, Thesprotiko, Lelovo.

== See also ==
- List of cities in ancient Epirus
