= Buchetium =

City in ancient Thesprotia

Coordinates: 39°09′22″N 20°50′53″E

Buchetium or Bouchetion (Ancient Greek: Βουχέτιον), or Buchaetium or Bouchaition (Βουχαίτιον), or Buchetum or Boucheton (Βουχετόν), or Bucheta or Boucheta (Βούχετα), was a city of the Cassopaei in ancient Thesprotia, a little above sea.

Its site was occupied by the medieval settlement of Rogoi, near modern Nea Kerasounta.
