= Qamil Çami =

Albanian writer and activist involved in the Albanian National Awakening

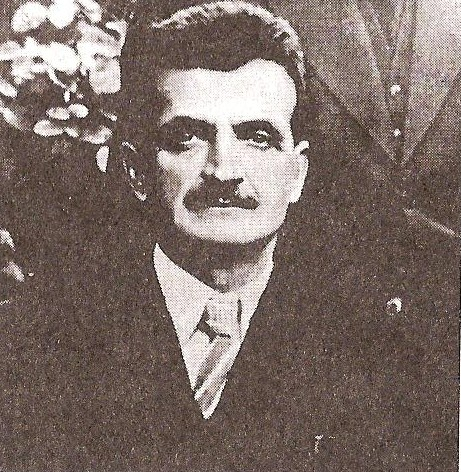
- Çami, c. 1922
- Born: January 4, 1875; Filiates, Ottoman Empire (now Greece)
- Died: September 26, 1933 (aged 58); Tirana, Albania
- Occupations: Writer, teacher
- Writing career
- Movement: National Renaissance of Albania

Qamil Izet Çami (January 4, 1875 – September 26, 1933) was an Albanian rilindas, poet and teacher. He and other rilindas from his area opened the first Albanian-language school of Filiates in 1908.

== Life ==
Çami was born in Filiates, then a town of the Ottoman Empire on January 4, 1875. His surname references his family are from Çamëria and are Cham Albanians hence it being Çami. In his youth he became a member of the literary club of Albanian students of Ioannina. After graduating in Istanbul he was appointed minor prefect of Sagiada in 1905. In 1907 also starting working as a teacher in the Ottoman school of his town, Filiates and taught written Albanian secretly. On August 25, 1908, along with other rilindas, he opened the first Albanian-language school of Filiates and became its headmaster. The funds were provided by the people of Filiates, such as Musa Demi, rilindas of the area and by other notable Cham Albanians like Rasih Dino, son of Abedin Dino.

During the Balkan Wars, he was imprisoned in Ioannina by the Greek army. He managed to escape after 10 months and went to Vlorë. In 1917 he was appointed director of education of south-eastern Albania and was located in Moscopole. In 1920 the Italian army imprisoned him in Sazan because he helped members of the Albanian independence movement. He was released from there after the end of the Vlora War on August 4, 1920. In 1922, after the proposal of Jani Minga to the Albanian government, Çami became prefect of Konispol. From 1924 to 1927 he worked voluntarily as teacher of the Albanian language for the Cham Albanian minority of Thesprotia, Greece (Çamëria), in the area of Paramythia.

== Death ==
He died on September 26, 1933, in Tirana. His poems were published after his death. He is considered one of the poets of the later era of the Albanian National Revival.
