= Chaonians =

Αncient Greek tribe in the region of Epirus

Regions of mainland Greece in antiquity. Chaonia stretched along the Ionian coast

The Chaonians (Ancient Greek: Χάονες, romanized: Cháones) were an ancient Greek people that inhabited the historical region of Epirus which today is part of northwestern Greece and southern Albania. Together with the Molossians and the Thesprotians, they formed the main tribes of the northwestern Greek group. In historical times on their southern frontier lay the Epirote kingdom of the Molossians, to their southwest stood the kingdom of the Thesprotians, and to their north the Illyrians. By the 5th century BC, they had conquered and combined to a large degree with the neighboring Thesprotians and Molossians. The Chaonians were part of the Epirote League until 170 BC when their territory was annexed by the Roman Republic.

== Name ==
=== Attestation ===
The ethnic name Χάονες Cháones is attested indirectly in the fragments of Hecataeus of Miletus (fl. c. 500 BC), the author of Περίοδος Γῆς or Περιήγησις (Description of the Earth or Periegesis), which have been preserved in the geographical lexicon Ἐθνικά (Ethnica) of Stephanus of Byzantium (fl. 6th century AD). The Chaonians are directly mentioned for the first time in c. 429 BC by Thucydides, the author of History of the Peloponnesian War.

=== Etymology ===
The etymology of the ethnic name Χάονες Cháones is uncertain. In modern bibliography, a connection of Χᾱον- to words like χάος 'void' and χάσκω 'to yawn, gape', has been proposed by linguist Vladimir I. Georgiev (also by Radoslav Katičić). The semantic shift which is required for Chaones to be linked to them may contain irregularities, although a common root may point to a term referring to a "rugged area". Significant phonemic differences between them, in particular Χᾱον- and the root *χᾰF-, render their relation even more improbable. The original root of the name may have even been entirely different and unrelated to *χᾰF-, but became unrecognizable during the course of its historical uses.

Several narratives were produced about the Chaonian ethnonym during the late classical era. According to the construction of mythological genealogies, Chaonians allegedly received their name from an eponymous ancestor named Cháōn, a Trojan hero who supposedly settled in Epirus. The Athenian comic playwright Aristophanes, in his play The Knights, punningly associated the ethnonym of the Chaonians with the similar sounding verb χάσκω, chásko 'to yawn', while in his play The Acharnians, with χάος, cháos 'chaos'; implying the situation that prevailed in Athenian foreign policy, and the indolent nature of Athenian politicians.

== Geography ==
Chaonia (Ancient Greek: Χαονία) was in the northwestern part of Epirus. It was one of the three main ethnic divisions of Epirus; the other two were Thesprotia and Molossia. The chronological arc when the toponym of Chaonia is attested ranges from the Classical Era to the Roman Era. Important river valleys that were included within Chaonia were those of Drino, Bistrica, Kalasa and Pavlla. Being under Chaonian control and playing an important geopolitical role in the region, the Drino valley represented a key land route between Illyria and northern Greece, which probably explains the reasons of the independence and notability of the Chaonians in classical antiquity.

Chaonia manifested a 'continental' propensity and the natives of the region had scarce interest for the sea. Nevertheless, with its strategic position on the routes towards Italy, Chaonia appears to have been precociously and continuously affected by the trans-Ionian and trans-Adriatic navigation routes that required their own cultural landscape. Among the oldest of these cultural landscapes was a 'colonial' landscape, the precocity of which is acknowledged only within the cultural sphere of the peraia of Korkyra.

=== Settlements and fortifications ===
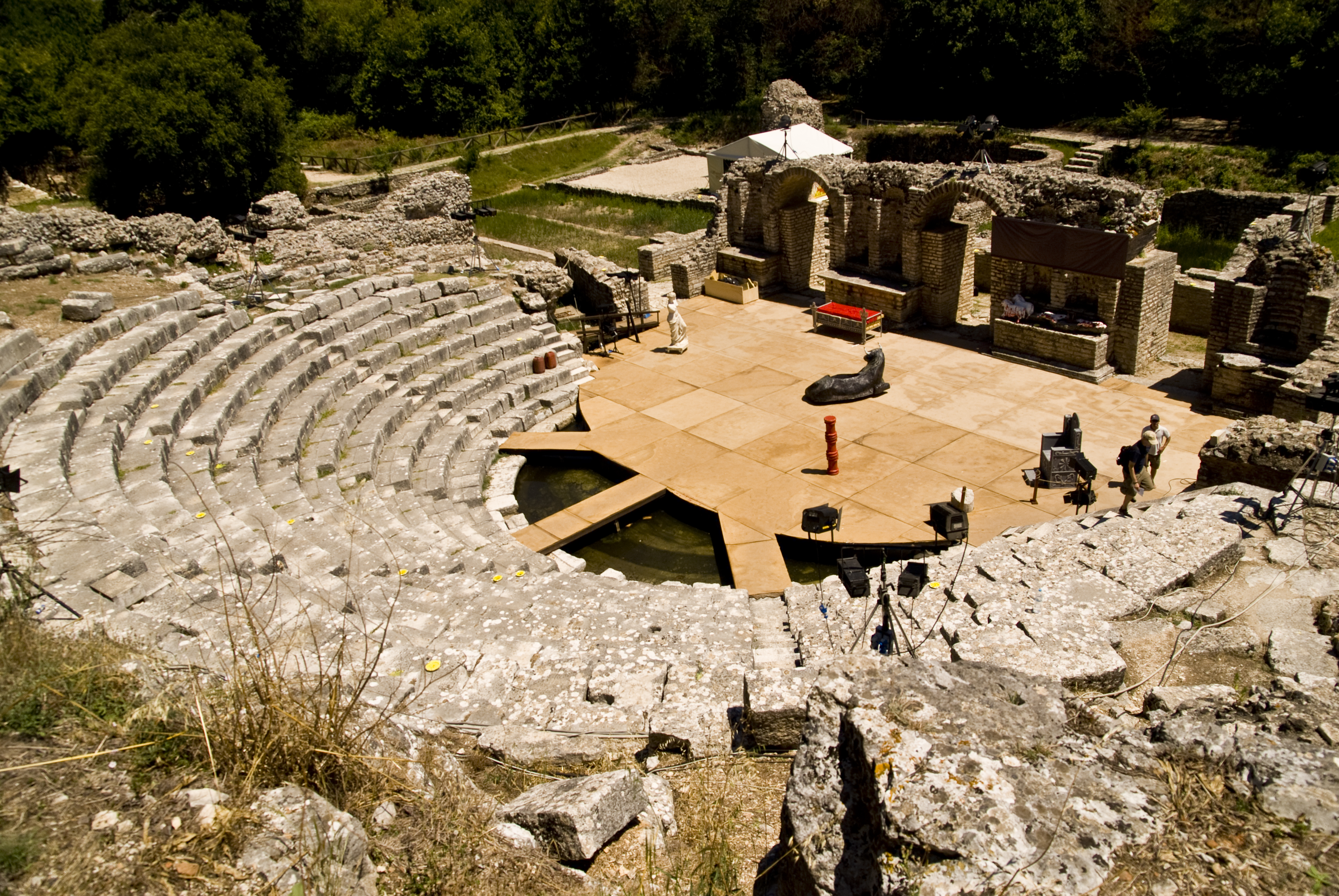
The theatre of Bouthroton built during the Hellenistic period

Hammond (1982) suggests that the lack of ancient Greek colonies in the territories of where Chaonians are attested since the classical era is linked to Chaonian control over this area which prevented the Greek city-states from establishing colonies.

The population of Chaonia lived mostly in rural settlements before the 4th century BCE. Phoenice which in time became the capital and most urbanized settlement of the Chaonians first developed in the late 4th century BCE. Phoenice peaked as an urban settlement in the mid-3rd century BCE. Bouthroton, was another settlement which developed during the Hellenistic era in Chaonia. The city and the territory it controlled was founded as a Korkyraian colony and enclave. It was abandoned in 475-350 BCE, which coincides with the involvement of Korkyra in the Peloponnesian War. Chaonians seem to have resettled this coastal area around 350-300 BCE. At the end of the 4th century BC, the city of Bouthroton, became Phoenice's harbor and experienced a thorough transformation, with the construction of a new city wall and the reactivation of the harbor and sanctuary. With the reorganization of the epineion of Bouthroton, Chaonia was opened towards the sea. Apart from those two cities the rest of the Chaonian territory retained its kata komas rural organization at the last half of the 4th century.

Onchesmos (present-day Saranda) was another harbor of Chaonia, however archaeological finds dating back to this period are lacking so far, possibly reflecting Onchesmos' secondary role in relation to that of Bouthroton. In the Hellenistic period Himara was the most northwestern fortification of Chaonia and an important center according to epigraphic and historical sources. Himara was of the earliest Chaonian fortifications and served as a fortified refuge for the rural settlements forming a restricted chora around it. Another stronghold in northwest of Chaonia was in Borsh, which controlled a crucial road that connected Chaonia and southern Illyria.

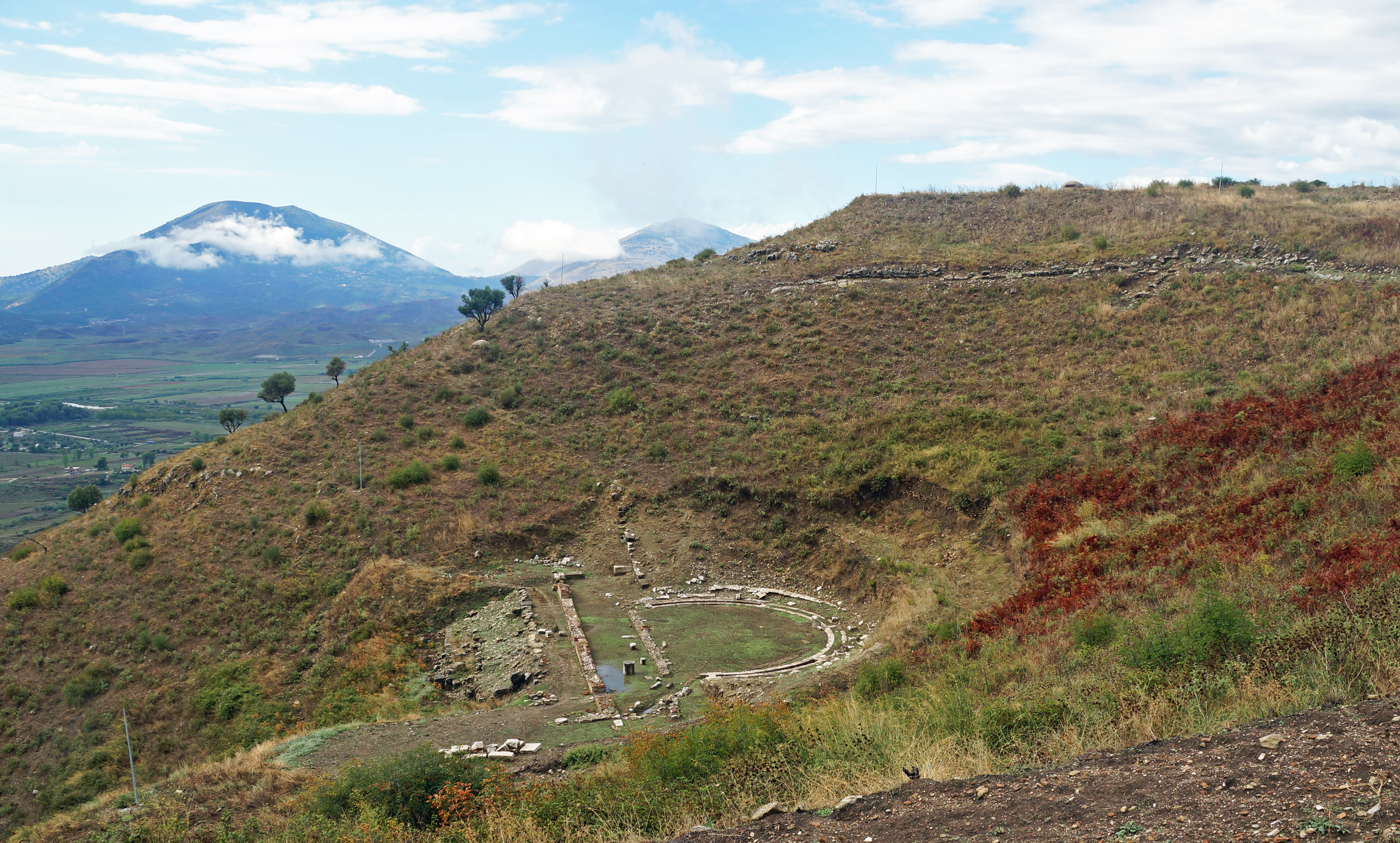
The theatre of Phoenice, political center of the Chaonians

The inclusion of Chaonia in the Kingdom of Epirus is linked to increasing control of Chaonian territories as royal lands by the Molossian King Pyrrhus. In the area of the Drino valley, Pyrrhus founded Antigonea in the early 3rd century BCE. It is unclear whether Pyrrhus founded Antigonea with approval from Chaonian elites or not. Nevertheless it indicates Pyrrhus' authority to interfere in the organization of the Epirote kingdom. A number of fortified farmsteads which likely belonged to landowners linked to Pyrrhus appeared during this era, mostly between Phoenice and Bouthroton in Matomara, Metoqi, Çumpora, Çuka and Malathrea and in Dobra. In the same era, such sites have been found in Melan, while sites in Lekel (possibly ancient Hecatompedon), Labova (possibly ancient Omphalion), Dholani e Derviçan and Selo secured various access points to the valley. The sites in Labovë e Sipërme, Dholan and Derviçan may have been fortified residences which developed around Antigonea in the same manner as the farmsteads between Phoenice and Bouthroton.

In the Roman era the main urban center was transferred to Hadrianopolis, on the left bank of the Drinos replacing Antigonea. The first phases of occupation found in Hadrianopolis seem to date back to at least the Hellenistic age.

=== Border zones ===
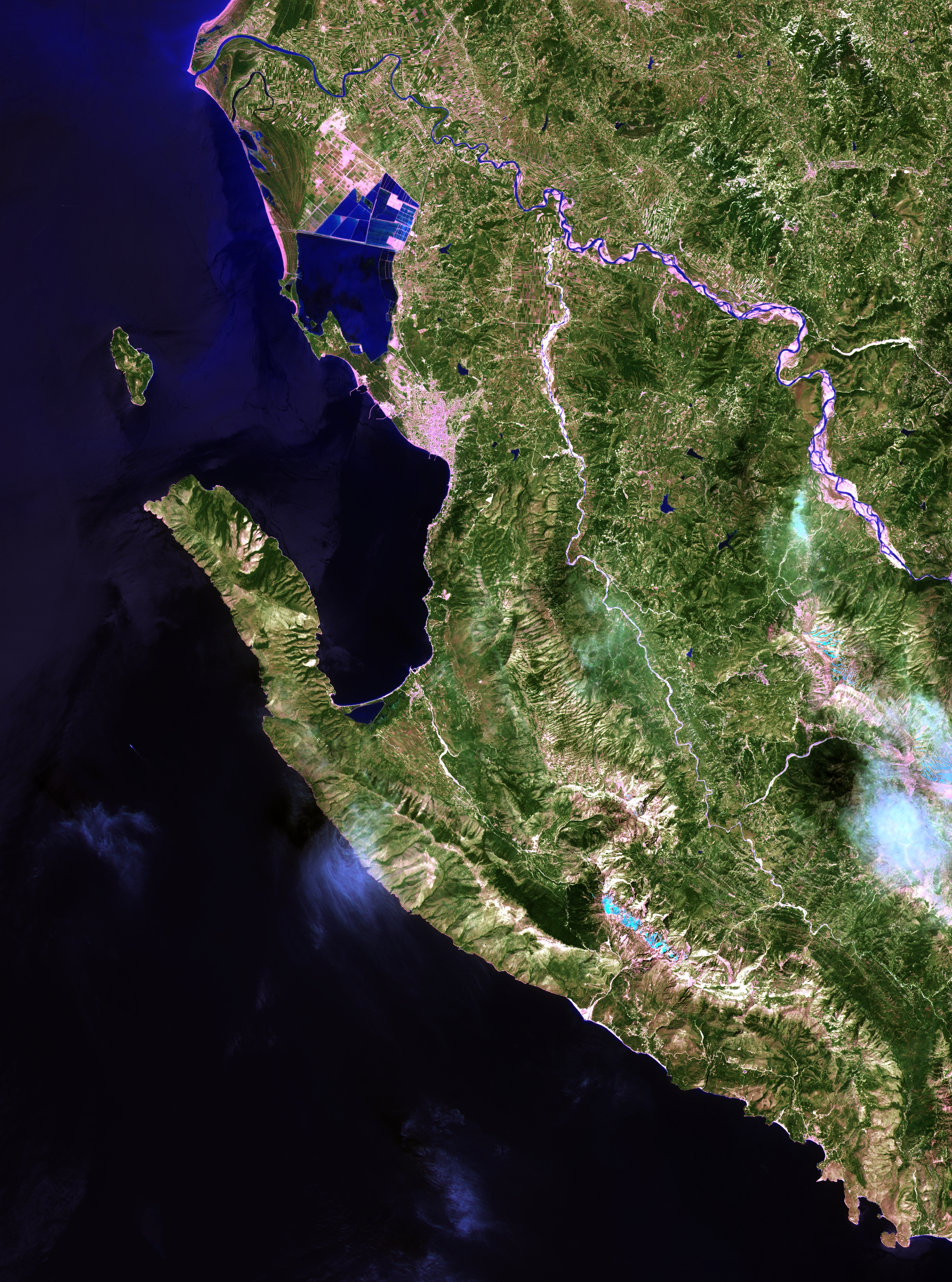

The borders in Epirus cannot be reconstructed with certainty before the 5th century BC. The broadest borders documented for Chaonia in historical times correspond to the mountain chain of Llogara (in the Acroceraunians) in the northwest, to the last offshoots of the massif of Kurveleshi in the north, to the mountain chain of Lunxhëri-Bureto in the northeast, to the river Thyamis in the south.

The region of the lower course of the Aoos as well as the Gulf of Aulon lay outside the Chaonian territory. As part of the southward expansion of Apollonia the lower Aoos region came under the control of this polis (during the capture of Thronium c. 450 BC). It has been suggested that Apollonia's expansion towards the south may have been due to the control of the northern end of the land route that crossed all of Epirus; from south to north. Apollonia was the northernmost Greek colony in direct interaction to Epirus, although the city itself located in Illyria. As such a major cultural border between Chaonia and Illyria could be found around that area.

The eastern border of Chaonia was located along the Drino and Aoos rivers. The eastern and southern boundaries of the Chaonians were also not clear and also changed over the centuries. This occurred due to a number of factors and historical events; seasonal movements of nomadic or semi-nomadic populations and relations towards the neighboring populations including the interests of the southern Greek powers: Corinth and the Athens as well as of the neighboring Greek nations. Also, to the north-east the Chaonians bordered the Atintanians, whose position is in question. In the east they were adjacent to the Paraueans who populated the valley on the right bank of the Aoos between the Straits of Këlcyrë and the Sarantaporos or alternatively only the southern part of the upper Aoos. In the southeast the Chaones were adjacent to the Molossians who occupied the current basin of Ioannina and to the south with the Thesprotians.

The Shushica River (which has been tentatively identified with Ancient Greek: Πολύανθος Polyanthos or Χαωνίτης Chaonites) set a clear boundary between Chaonians and Amantes, who constituted two distinct tribal communities separated and protected against each other by fortification systems. Strongholds of the Amantes that separated them from the Chaonians were Cerja on the right side of Shushica, and Matohasanaj, which controlled a natural route between southern Illyria and Epirus.

The southern borders of Chaonia were located at Cestrine, an area contested between the Chaonians and the Thesprotians. Cestrine stretched along the modern Greek-Albanian border in the Filiates and Konispol areas.

=== Discussion in ancient sources and historiography ===
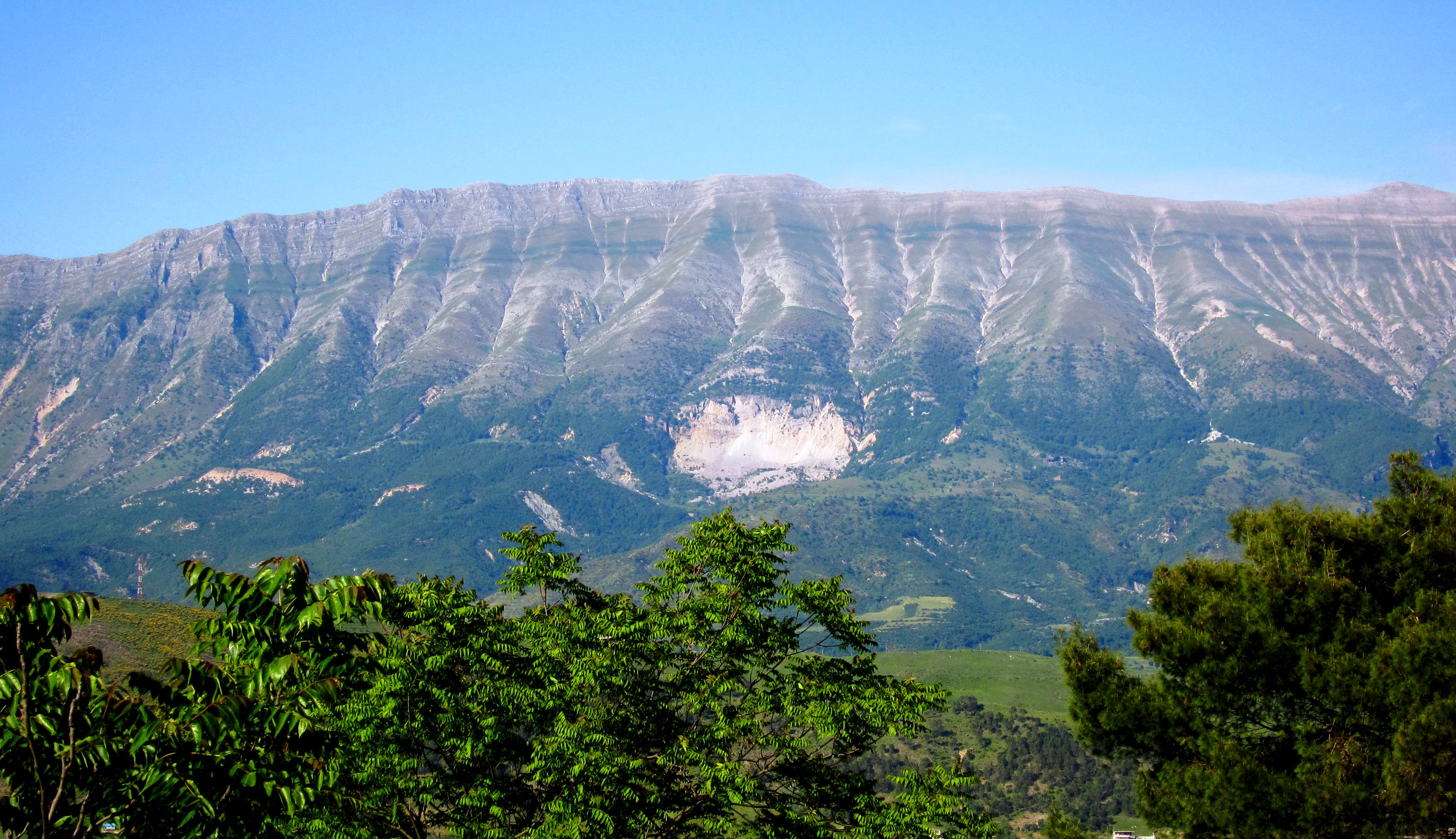
The Mali i Gjerë (wide mountain) range divided the Chaonian territory in two parts; the western part centered around Phoenice and the eastern one around the area where Antigonea was located.

According to Šašel Kos, at the time of Pseudo-Scylax, Chaonians as well as all the peoples to the north and to the south of Chaonia were living in villages, while Greece began at the Greek polis of Ambracia. However, Šašel Kos also stated that both northern and southern Epirus was part of the Greek world, but possessing their own ethnic identity. As reported in a fragment of Hecataeus of Miletus (around 6th century BC), the Chaonian tribe of the Dexaroi bordered the Enchele to their north. According to Sharon Stocker, Chaonia in the 5th century BC was not considered part of "Greece", but was considered part of it by the beginning of the Hellenistic period. For Lazari and Kanta-Kitsou (2010), the main geographical positions of the peoples of Epirus had become fixed by the 8th century BCE with further divisions involving internal re-organization between smaller units.

In ancient sources, including, the Periplus of Pseudo-Scylax (4th century BCE) and Periodos to Nicomedes by Pseudo-Scymnus (5th century CE) based on Ephoros of Kyme (mid 4th century BCE), Chaonia begins to the south of the ancient Greek city of Oricum, which the Periplus locates within the territory of Illyrian Amantia. Pseudo-Scymnus lists Chaonia as one of the lands of "barbarian" tribes between the two cities of Oricum and Ambrakia. The author of the Periplus differentiated between the Illyrian peoples, barbarians, like the Amantes, to the north of Chaonia, and the Chaonians to the south. On the Amantes there is no agreement on their identity since Proxenos (3rd century B.C) and Hesychius consider them Epirotes, while Pliny the Elder "barbarians". Pliny and Strabo define the natural border of Chaonia at the Acroceraunian Mountains, while Appian in his description of Illyria describes Epirus as starting south of the Aoos river. Oricum was located on the foot of the Acroceraunian Mountains and was thus in a border area between the Chaonians, who were located south of the Acroceraunians mountains, and the southernmost Illyrians, who were located on the foot of these mountains. This placement caused misunderstandings among ancient authors about Oricum's location in Illyria or Epirus. Ptolemy locates Oricum in Chaonia and similarly Flavius Philostratus locates it in Epirus. However, from a geographical perspective the territory of Epirus hardly goes beyond the Acroceraunian Mountains, which represent a natural border that is difficult to cross, the Llogara pass being the only crossing between these two regions. According to Dausse, although most of the time various mountain ranges such as the Acroceraunians were marked as border areas they frequently turned to meeting places of various groups instead of border zones.

N. G. L. Hammond has proposed that the area of Chaonians for the period around the 6th century BC was a vast northern dominion of the Chaonians in an area which expanded from the Bay of Vlorë in the south to the Korçë Plain in the north and the lakeland area in the east. According to Hammond's historical reconstruction, the Chaonians might have lost some pastures, but they would have kept control of the pastures in the area that stretched from Grammos to the south-western side of the lakeland region. They would also have suffered losses at the hands of the Illyrian Taulantii and the settlers at Apollonia, who would have captured the southern part of the coastal plain, which coincides with the present-day region of Malakastra. Hammond's hypothesis is based on an information provided by Hecataeus, according to which Chaonians and Enchelei were neighboring peoples, and on the appearance of some 6th century BC tumuli in the Korça basin containing the burials of new rulers, who are considered Chaonians by Hammond. However according to Bogdani the archaeological evidence is far from certain, since there are no elements of connection between the Chaonians and these new rulers, and the same consideration can be made for the historical source, especially taking into account the fact that the knowledge about the northern Chaonian tribe of the Dexaroi is limited to a single fragment of Hecataeus of Miletus.

== History ==
=== Early period ===
The formation process of the Chaonians remains an unsolved complex problem. In the territory where Chaonians appeared during the late Iron Age, tumulus burial was persistent during the final period of the Bronze Age, a practice which to a degree continued to be in use in the next era. There is a lack of attestation of a certain continuity between the facies of the Late Bronze Age and of the Early Iron Age, which is documented by the tumulus necropolises and by populated areas that sometimes appear to be enclosed, and the more organized settlements of the late Classical and Hellenistic periods. This discontinuity reveals a more drastic change in the settlement schemes and socio-economic structures of Chaonia in comparison to those found in the other ethnic districts of Epirus. (Note: In the current state of research Chaonia lacks evidence of sites settled continuously between the end of the 2nd millennium BC and the beginning of the 1st millennium BC and the 4th century BC, such as the Molossian komai of Vitsa and Liatovouni, or down to the advanced Hellenistic period, such as several settlements of the Ioannina basin in Molossia and the Cocytus basin in Thesprotia.)

Ancient authors also starting from Hecataeus of Miletus (6th-5th centuriec BC) highlighted the contiguity of the Chaonians to the Illyrian people settled north of the Acroceraunian Mountains, but they have never identified or affiliated Chaonians with Illyrian tribes. Archaeological material from the classical and Hellenistic periods near Tragjas, Vlorë, (Bregu i Kishës) fits well into a series of prehistoric fortifications located throughout the Chaonian coast.

To the uncertainty of the most ancient phases of population settlement of the Chaonian indigenous hinterland corresponds the solid projection of Korkyra on the "Mainland", reflected in the 7th century BC pre-colonial emergence of Bouthroton. During the archaic and early classical era the coastal part of Chaonia was a peraia of Korkyra, this development may have boosted political changes among the Chaonians who abolished their monarchy early compared to adjacents tribes. As part of that area around c. 500 BC Hecateus mentioned that the region of Chaonia included the Kiraios bay and its plain; a reference to the bay of Bouthrotos and the valley of the Pavllas. The same author also reports that the Chaonian tribe of the Dexaroi bordered the Enchele to their north.

=== Classical period ===
==== 5th century BC ====
Strabo reports a narrative which probably traces back to Theopompus of Chios (c. mid-4th century BC), according to which Chaonians first, and then Molossians, were the most powerful regional groups. This may reflect in text the memory of a Chaonian territorial expansion and influence before the Molossian ascendancy of the 4th century BCE. This remained an isolated account in ancient historiography, leaving even fewer archaeological evidence.

During the Peloponnesian War, the Chaonians appear in several campaigns and battles as allies of the Peloponnesian League. Thucydides, the chief historian of the Peloponnesian War highlights in his work the campaigns against Acarnania (430-429 BCE) and the battles against the Korkyra near Bouthroton (427 BCE). In both cases, Chaonians supported military forces allied with the Peloponnesian League. The first account on Ambracia's attempt to conquer Amphilochian Argos and other Acarnanian territories in 430-429 BC, during the Peloponnesian War. In the events of 430 BC, the Chaonians are mentioned along with other adjacent tribes as allies of Ambracia called "barbarian" by Thucydides, attacking Argos, however without managing to conquer the city. The next year the Ambraciots organized a large campaign to invade Acarnania, which was Athens' ally. They requested the help of Sparta, and the Spartan fleet commander Cnemus led the expedition of the Greek forces and those troops. Among the latter were 1,000 kingless Chaonians commanded by their annual "prostates" (Greek: προστάτες, "protectors") Photios and Nikanor. The Thesprotians, who were kingless as well, were arrayed along with the Chaonians. Thucydides mentions that the Chaonians who "were famed for being the best from that part of the mainland" occupied the center of the allied army in the attack against the capital of Acarnania, Stratos and suffered heavy losses as they were defeated by Stratians. As the Chaonians suffered the heaviest losses of all groups from Epirus which were involved, this may have been the era when Molossians exploited Chaonian weakness and allied with themselves with Athens as the starting point for their later ascendancy during the 4th century BCE.

The Chaonians temporary control over Thesprotian territory is highlighted by their explicit role as creators and organizers of the 429 BC expedition to Acarnania. Although it is unlikely that Chaonians' direct territorial control stretched as far south as Ambracia, their political interests reached this area. Thucydides records another passage that provides evidence for a Chaonian territorial expansion southwards, as he reports that the River Thyamis constituted the northern border of Thesprotia, thus assuming that the region of Cestrine belonged to Chaonia, while usually it is said to have belonged to Thesprotia. Another classical source that provides evidence for a southern Chaonian expansion down to Ambracia is a fragment of Hellanicus of Lesbos (late 5th century BC).

Chaonian politics of 429 BC and the interests of the polis of Korkyra (led by its democratic faction) were in contrast which explains the need for the Corcyraeans of Bouthroton who belonged to the democratic faction to defend themselves at the crucial point of connection with the hinterland by building the Dema Wall. Fortifications in the vicinity of Bouthroton seem to have been increasingly built since 475 BCE. In 427 BCE, Thucydides reports that the Korkyrean oligarchic faction took control of the defensive structures of Bouthroton with Corinthian and Chaonian support. The defeat of democratic polities in the Peloponnesian War profoundly shaped political developments in Epirus, with a progressive emergence of the monarchy in Molossia. The weakening of Korkyrean power, which was consumed by the civil war, and the ever expansive Athenian influence among the Epirote groups, in particular in favor of the Molossians, led to a shift in the internal political balances and tribal territorial boundaries in Epirus.

It appears that by the end of the 5th century BC Chaonia lost its expansion and influence in the south, with Cestrine being ceded to the Thesprotians.

==== 4th century BC ====
Molossian expansion under Tharyps (c. 430-392 BC) weakened the Chaonians. During the Illyrian invasions in Molossia, the first in 385/384 BC led most likely by Bardylis with the support of Dionysius I of Syracuse, and the other in 316 BC, it appears that Illyrians moved southwards into Molossia along a land route, ravaging its territory without experiencing any resistance. It has been suggested that the Illyrian invaders crossed Chaonian territory, due their position between the Illyrians and the Molossians. The passage of the Illyrians must have been eased by some alliance between them and the Chaonians. Both Chaonians and Thesprotians were perhaps affected by the expedition of the Illyrians. As such the Mollosians perhaps took advange towards their Epirote counterparts during the reign of Alcetas and expanded their power in part of the Epirote coast.

4th century BC dynamics led to a reorganization of Chaonia from the perspective of both political and settlement structures. Starting from around mid-4th century BC Chaonians minted coins, bearing the inscription ΧΑ, which is to be read as ΧΑΟΝΩΝ. They adopted a new economic policy, based on coinage and therefore more oriented towards exchanges, according to the model provided by central Greece. By minting their own currency Chaonians declared and stressed their political autonomy. From the 4th century BC Chaonians were invited to various Panhellenic Games, being no longer perceived as 'barbarians'.

Chaonia is mentioned in a list of theorodokoi of Epidauros dating back to c. mid-4th century BC, which provides evidence for the existence of a Chaonian independent tribal state.

The appearance of Phoinike in the list of theorodokoi of Argos ca. 330-328 BCE suggests that the Chaonians now had an urban center of reference or capital city, in addition to the villages of the traditional type. The itineraries of the theorodokoi sacred envoys may also confirm Chaonian independence until the end of the fourth century BC, delaying the alliance with (and possibly subjection to) the Molossian state, which the rest of Epirus would have already joined. It has been suggested that the mention of Phoinike in the list of theorodokoi of Argos (ca. 330-328 BC) provides evidence that the Argive theoroi visited the city, but that it does not provide evidence that the koinon of the Chaonians might not have also constituted part of the state of Epirus.

=== Hellenistic period ===
Chaonians joined Pyrrhus of Epirus during his Italian campaign.

Molossian expansion resulted in the inclusion of the Chaonians in a unified Epirote state in the era between c. 340-330 BC under Alexander I and c. 297-295 BCE. It can't be ruled out that this unification may have taken place sometime earlier than 330 BC.

Between 317 BC-297 BC political changes, as indicated by an inscription on a bronze plate found in Dodona, reveal the expansion of the Molossian state and the creation of the military alliance of the Epirotes (symmachia), with Chaonia being part of it. This change initiated a period of political stability in the area. The foundation of the city of Antigonia around 296/295 BC on the Drino valley in Chaonia by Pyrrhus of Epirus, naming it after his first wife, Antigone, marks the end of this process of unification. Another fact that provide certain evidence of Chaonian inclusion into the Epirote state under the Aeacids is that Chaonians joined king Pyrrhus of Epirus in his Italian campaign (280–275 BC). Moreover, the Epirote contingents that fought in the campaigns of Magna Graecia and Sicily consisted also of elite Chaonian warriors.

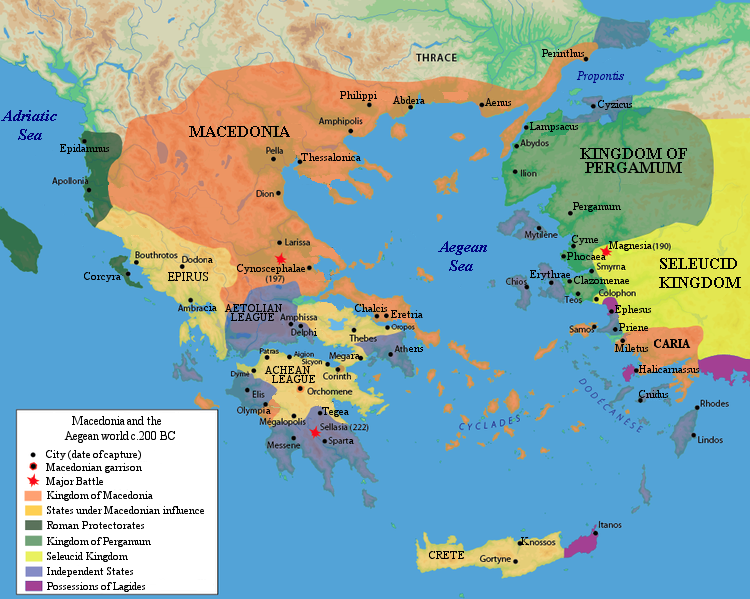
Chaonia as part of the federal "Koinon of the Epirotes" in c. 200 B.C.

In circa 233 BC, Queen Deidamia II of Epirus, the last member of the Aeacid ruling dynasty, was assassinated. As such the monarchy in Epirus was abolished and a federal government of the Epirote League was established with Phoenice as its capital. Polybius recounts a devastating raid mounted in 230 BC by the Illyrians against Phoenice. The incident had major political ramifications where many Italian traders who were in the town at the time of the sacking were killed or enslaved by the Illyrians, prompting the Roman Republic to launch the first of the two Illyrian Wars the following year. An Epirote force sent to Phoenice was defeated prompting an appeal to Achaeans and Aetolians for support. They reinforced the remaining Epirote units and were ready to face the Illyrians at Helicranon. However, the later withdrew on terms.

=== Roman period ===
Chaonia and the rest of Epirus were annexed by the Romans after the Third Macedonian War (168-167 BCE). During the war, Molossians and the major Thesprotian groups supported the anti-Roman coalition, while Chaonians fought as allies of the Roman army. As such, there is a strong contrast between the development of Chaonia, Molossia and Thesprotia after the war. While the latter regions faced great destruction including the burning of many settlements and widespread enslavement, Chaonia remained unaffected and continued to flourish with the exception of the city of Antigonea, built by the Aeacid king of Epirus, Pyrrhus, in Chaonian territory, which was burnt down. Antigonea itself was destroyed due to infighting between different factions in Epirus.

After 167 BCE, Chaonia itself was divided administratively in several semi-autonomous political communities. The koinon of the Prasaiboi was created with its center in Bouthroton. The Prasaiboi before the war were probably one of the smaller communities in Chaonia and possibly Thesprotia which benefited from their alliance with Rome and acquired a separate administrative status. It is unclear if Phoinike was at the early era of Roman rule under the Prasaiboi or a separate Chaonian community and what relations it held with another community which appears as the Epirotes around Phoinike. The Prasaiboi seem to have consisted of at least five communities as attested in the use of ethnic names: Aixonios, Tharios, Kotulaios, O...-atas and Prochtheios.

== Political structure ==
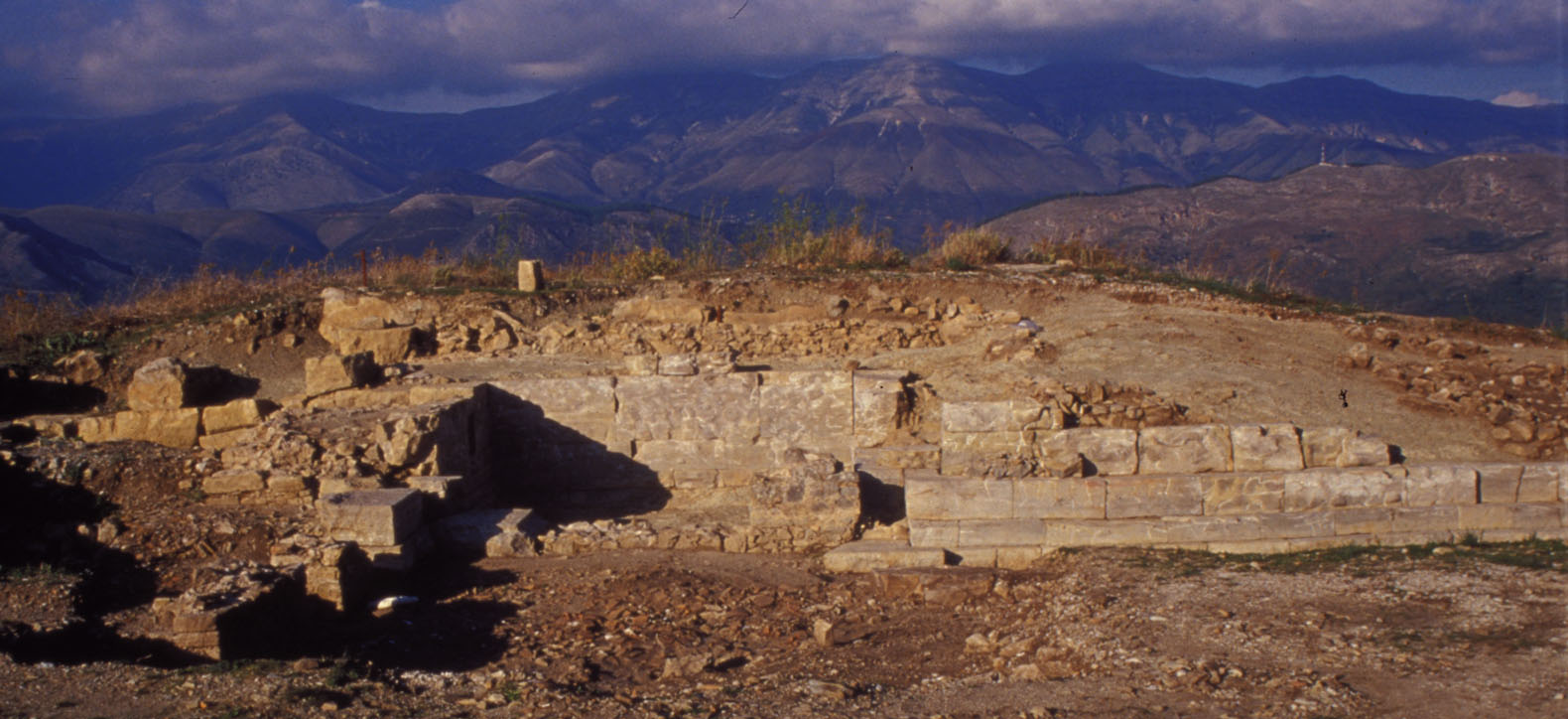
Ruins of ancient Phoenice, the chief city of the Chaones.

The Chaonians were settled Kata Komas (Ancient Greek: Κατά Κώμας) meaning in a collection of villages and not in an organized polis (despite the fact that they called their community a polis) and were a tribal state in the 5th century BC. As reported by the most common ancient account Epirus was first ruled by the Chaonians, while the rule of the Molossians started only later. According to Thucydides, their leaders were chosen on an annual basis; he names two such leaders, Photius and Nikanor "from the ruling lineage". In the 4th century BC, the Chaonians adopted the term prostates (Greek: προστάτης, "ruler") to describe their leaders, like most Greek tribal states at the time. Other terms for office were grammateus (Greek: Γραμματεύς, "secretary"), demiourgoi (Greek: δημιουργοί, "creators"), hieromnemones (Greek: ἱερομνήμονες, "of the sacred memory") and synarchontes (Greek: συνάρχοντες, "co-rulers").

They were loosely associated with the rest of the Epirote tribes (Ancient Greek: φυλαί, romanized: phylae), including the Thesprotians and Molossians. They joined the Epirote League, founded in 325/320 BC, uniting their territories with those of the rest of the Epirotes in a loosely federated state that became a major power in the region until it was conquered by Rome in 170 BC.

== Economy ==
Chaonia was an area where pastoral life was prominent, as is also evidenced by the local numismatic iconography. The pastoral character of the area was particularly renowned during Roman times. In Virgil's Georgics, a poem that described and idealized rural life, the author praised the goods of agriculture, contrasting the pre-eminent pastoral model; that of Chaonia. In general, Roman poets praised Chaonia as a model of bucolic life; similar to that of Arcadia. Rich Roman businessmen settled in Chaonia, where they established large villas with agricultural and livestock units. The most prominent example is that of Titus Pomponius Atticus, who built Amaltheion or Amaltheia near Bouthrotos, and bred horses and 120 herds of oxen. However, it is clear that the contrast between the agricultural and pastoral communities was very subtle, and in part, largely plasmatic. The local society was generally rural, and its inhabitants tried to achieve self-sufficiency through a number of means that complemented each other. The character of the economy was a consequence of the mountainous environment. Chaonian winter pastures stretched from modern-day Konispol in the south to the Gulf of Aulon in the north. Additionally, with regard to pastoralism and nomadism, no source or archaeological document describes the Chaonians and the other peoples of the area as nomads.

The descriptions of ancient authors indicate that the region was densely populated during the 4th century BC. This made the adoption of a new way of life imperative, because the nomadic or semi-nomadic economy could not sustain the ever-increasing population, while constant raids and military operations would make extensive living in unfortified villages problematic; especially with the transhumant seasonal movement of men. This required a shift to a more permanent and organized settlement, which ensured better defense and the parallel exercise of various economic activities, such as agriculture, hunting, fishing and animal husbandry; the latter, however, on a more limited scale than that of nomadic or semi-nomadic. Henceforth, there was import and export of cereals in the region, while it also served as a supply base for troops. The reorganization of the economy also created new sources of wealth, through artisanship, which improved transactions and prompted Chaonians to create their first coins in the 4th century BC. The excavation of Phoenice – the capital of the Chaonians – unearthed 800 coins, of which 20 were issued by the Chaonians; evidence of their economic prosperity, extroversion, and independent development.

Women had rights over family property (including the slaves), and they could manage it, sell it, or even give it up, without the mediation of a male guardian. Also, it was common for slaves, after their liberation acts, to remain at the side of their former masters, for as long as the latter lived. This reveals the strong bond between the slaves and their owners; possibly due to the late adoption of slavery in the region, and the preservation of tribal ties, the core of which was the house, and therefore all the members attached to it were largely integral.

== Language ==
Distribution of Greek dialects in the classical period, with Epirus and Chaonia in the far northwest, shown speaking Northwest Greek.

There is today an overall consensus that the Chaonians were among the Greek-speaking population of Epirus, which spoke the North-West Doric dialect of Ancient Greek, akin to that of Aetolia, Phocis, and certain other regions, this is also attested by the available epigraphic evidence in Epirus.

Due to the fact that Greek toponyms preserving archaic features are very densely found in the wider area, it appears, according to Vladimir I. Georgiev, that speakers of the Proto-Greek language inhabited a region which included Chaonia before the Late Bronze Age migrations (ca. 2500 BC). Eugene Borza argues that the Molossians originated from a pool of Proto-Greek tribes inhabiting northwestern Greece. Hammond argues the Chaonians and other Epirote tribes spoke Greek at least from the Dark Ages (1100–800 BC). Hammond further argues that Pseudo-Scylax's description of the situation about 380-360 BC indicates that they did not speak Illyrian and that their acceptance in 330 BC into the Epirote League is a strong indication that they spoke Greek; Chaonian inscriptions, all in Greek, began around 329 BC.

In the northern part of the region of Epirus, contact with Illyrian-speakers may have further increased sub-dialectal variation within North-West Doric, although concrete evidence outside of onomastics is lacking. On the other hand, penetration of Greek speech, including Epirote, was much more evident among the adjacent Illyrian tribes. Filos asserts that Epirus was a largely Greek-speaking region, as indicated in epigraphic material, although a uniform picture in the sense of dialect use is far from certain, at least regarding the northern parts bordering Southern Illyria, namely Chaonia, where interaction with Southern Illyria and a certain degree of bilingualism in the northern parts must have been a reality, especially in later times. David R. Hernandez (2018) states that an older theory by Pierre Cabanes (1979) that Chaonians spoke Illyrian, while Molossians and Thesprotians Greek is unlikely since the notion of any ethnic and lingual division inside Epirus appears unfounded. Also concluding that Chaonians spoke a West Greek dialect as spoken elsewhere in Epirus as well in Acarnania.

== Religion ==
The sanctuary of Dodona was a religious site frequented by all the Epirote peoples, including the Chaonians. Chaonians constructed their own treasury, likely as a way to highlight their participation and to enhance their identity. The region of Chaonia appears as a place visited by the theoroi, in an Epidaurian list of theorodokoi. Theoroi were sent by the major Panhellenic sanctuaries throughout the Greek world, and theorodokoi's duty was to host and assist the former in preparation of the Panhellenic games and festivals. The list was compiled in 360 or 356 BC. The worship of many Greek gods is attested in Chaonia; these include Athena, Artemis, Asclepius, Zeus, Pan and Poseidon. In particular, at Bouthrotos, the worship of Athena, Asclepius and Zeus Soter is attested; the combined worship of the three, is associated with coastal areas and may have been part of a common cult that is also attested in other parts of the Greek world.

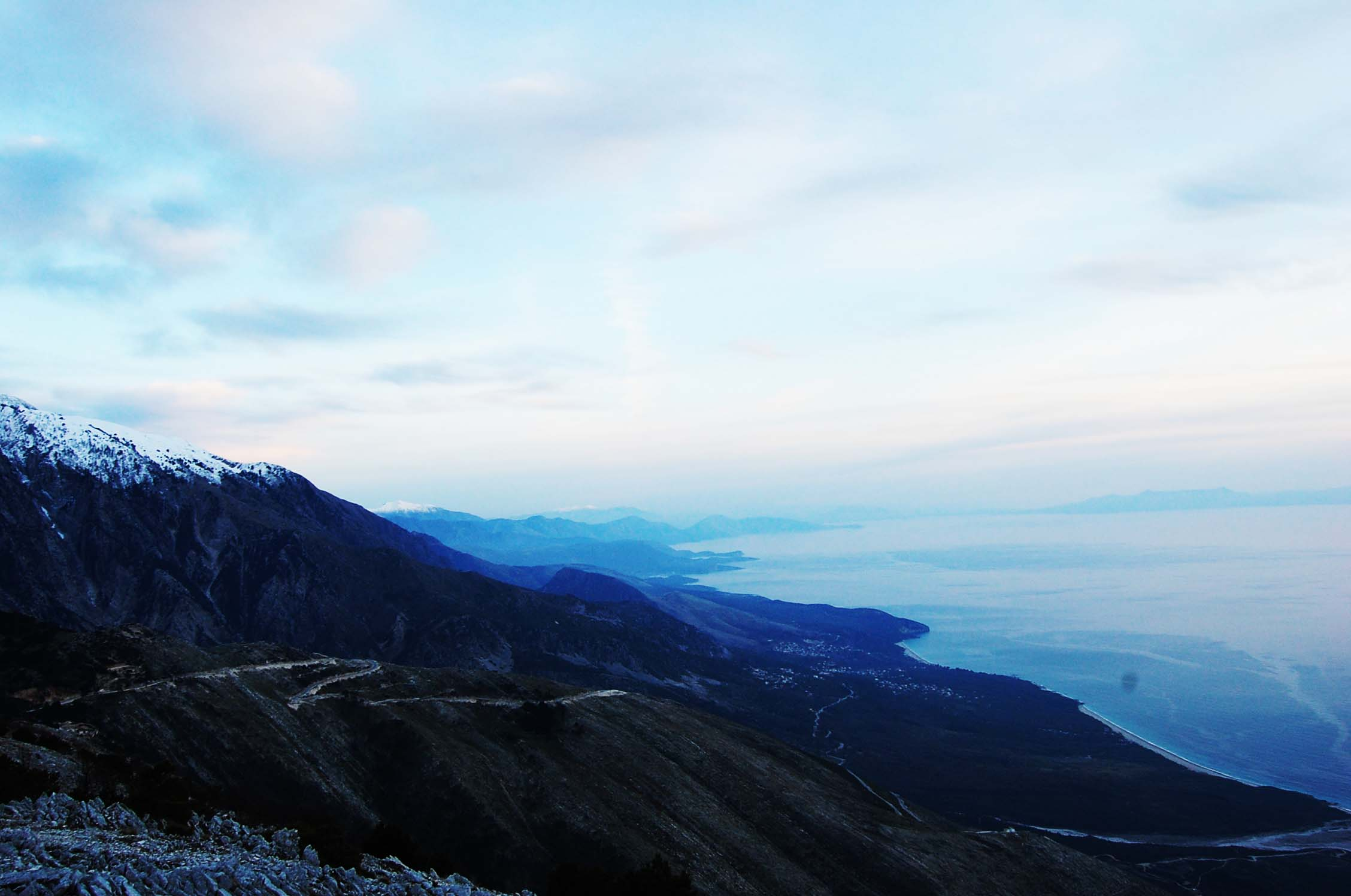
The Ceraunian mountains were associated with Zeus the Chaonian

Zeus, the central figure of the Greek Pantheon, was a popular deity among the Chaonians, as well as the rest of northern Greece. Zeus Chaonius was also associated with the Acroceraunian mountains. In Bouthrotos, he was one of the main deities with the epithet "Soter" (Zeus Soter 'Zeus the Saviour'); the epithet "Soter" is associated with the protection of sailors. In the same city, Zeus was also invoked with the epithet "Kassios". Heracles – who was a son of Zeus – was another deity that was worshipped in Bouthrotos.

The worship of Poseidon was popular in the region and Taurian Poseidon (Greek: Ταύρειος Πωσειδών) is associated with chthonic features, being protector of the shepherds and the flocks. This kind of worship was quite archaic in the region and was preserved from prehistoric Mycenaean Greece (1600-1100 B.C).

A temple dedicated to Athena Polias was erected in Chaonian territory, which is attested from an oracular lamella from Dodona dated to ca. 330–320 BC. The inscription on the lamella states: "Good fortune. The polis of the Chaonians asks Zeus Naos and Dione if it is desirable, better, and more advantageous to move and rebuild the Temple of Athena Polias." According to Evangelidis and Gjongecaj, the aforementioned polis pertains to the capital of the Chaonians, Phoenice. There is evidence that this temple was initially located at Bouthrotos; such as a number of Corinthian ostraca from the citadel, that bore the inscription "ΑΘΑ" (ATHA), which has been rendered as "ΑΘΑΝΑΣ" (ATHANAS) and indicates that the archaic temple of Bouthrotos was probably dedicated to Athena. Regardless of whether the temple of Athena Polias – mentioned on the lamella from Dodona – was located in Phoenice, Bouthrotos, or elsewhere, the importance and prominent position of the goddess in Chaonia is also confirmed by the coins of the ethnos, where she is depicted with a Corinthian helmet The cult of Athena was introduced to Epirus for the first time by the Corinthian colonists.

Between the end of the 4th century and the beginning of the 3rd century BC, a temenos was assigned to the god of medicine and healing, Asclepius. The establishment of his worship probably took place under the reign of Pyrrhus; however, Pyrrhus might only be responsible for the monumental construction of the asclepeion, while the worship itself may have been inherent due to the geophysical wealth of the site. During the excavations, hydrocarbon deposits and sulfur gas were found; the latter is one of the main components of thermal springs, whose main deity was Asclepius. Liberation acts of the 2nd - 1st c. BC were found at the city's theater (western parodos and diazoma), most of which were dedicated to Asclepius. Among the recorded officials, the priest of the god is also included. The priests of Asclepius came from the local ruling class, since the inscriptions show that some people had served both as generals and priests of the god; this indicates that the cult of Asclepius was intertwined with the public affairs of the city. The publication of the liberation acts at the temene is not only characteristic of Bouthrotos, but also of the other asclepieia; such as those of Nafpaktos, Orchomenos, Chaeronia, Epidaurus, etc. With the development of Bouthrotos' urban center, Asclepius seems to have become the patron god of the city, replacing Athena, who is not mentioned in any inscription thereafter.

On the Chaonian coast numerous euploia sanctuaries have been found where sailors have left their epigraphic trace on the rock of cliffs or natural cavities. Among those the bay of Grammata is only reachable from the sea at the northern border of Chaonia in the Acroceraunians.

== In ancient sources and inscriptions ==
Modern scholarship hardly denies the belonging of the Chaonians to Greek culture and ethnicity, though classical era literature preferred a more 'peripheral' connotation and described them as "barbaroi". However, there is no convincing evidence that other than Greek populations were inhabiting Epirus despite some ancient authors preferred that description. Older theories (Crossland (1982), Nillson (1909)) posited a possible (partial) Hellenization of pre-classical Epirus, however such views relied on subjective ancient testimonies and are not supported by the epigraph evidence especially the earliest texts. However, the inclusion of the Chaonians among the "barbarians" was not in the sense that their culture, customs or behavior were in diametrical opposition to Greek norms, but rather because of their seemingly more primitive way of life marked them as "deficient Greeks".

The Periplus of Pseudo-Scylax makes a clear distinction between the Chaonians and their northern neighbours, the Illyrian tribes that occupied the coastal and hinterland regions further north. The Greek historian Thucydides describes them as barbaroi while their "ruling family" (τὸ άρχικὸν γένος) apparently had Greek names. It can be also asserted that from references in Thucydides' work it is clear that the ancient historian was able to distinguish between various groups of Greeks, semi-Greeks, bilinguals, and non-Greeks, yet he distinguished very explicitly, even within the same coalitions, Epirote barbarians from Greeks, reporting the Epirotes as barbarians. However, Thucydides had similar views of the neighboring Aetolians and Acarnians, even though the evidence leaves no doubt that they were Greek. The term "barbarian" denoted not only clearly non-Greek populations, but also Greek populations on the fringe of the Greek world with peculiar dialects and preserving an archaic way of life that would have been incomprehensible to the inhabitants of the more developed Greek city-states to the south. Although described as such by Thucydides, ancient Greek authors didn't often hesitate to consider them amongst the most ancient Hellenic people together with the Molossians and Thesprotians and their homeland as the birthplace of ancient Greece. Such as Aristotle who had famously said that in the region around Dodona, Epirus, was the place where the Hellenes originated.

Pseudo-Scymnus considered the Chaonians barbarians, while Polybius considered the Epirotes, and the Chaonians specifically, to be Greek. According to Plutarch, the Molossian king Tharrhypas was the first to introduce Greek letters and customs in Epirus, and to administer the cities with humane laws, when he was sent to Athens to be educated in the 5th century BC. There were also some local peculiarities among the Greek-speaking tribes of Epirus.

A much more reliable source about the actual views of contemporary Greeks concerning Epirus is the epigraphic material which contains the list of theorodokoi (Ancient Greek: θεωρόδοκοι or θεαροδόκοι; sacred envoy-receivers whose duty was to host and assist the theoroi (θεωροί 'viewers') before the Panhellenic games and festivals), listing Greek cities and tribes, to which the major Panhellenic sanctuaries sent theoroi in Epidaurus, which includes the Epirotes. The list which was compiled in 360 or 356 BC includes the sacred envoys (members of the ruling family of each tribe or subtribe) of the Molossians, Kassopeans, Chaonians and Thesprotians. The weight of this evidence is decisive because only Greeks (Hellenes) were permitted to participate in the Panhellenic games and festivals.

== Mythological origins ==
Chaonians sought their mythical progenitor in the Homeric epics, similar to other tribes in Greece. They chose the Trojan prince Helenus. Though this tradition is commonly considered to have been created during the time of Alcetas, or even Pyrrhus (along with later additions that date to the Roman times), according to Dakaris, Hammond, and Chanteli it is very likely that the core of the mythological genealogy of the Chaonians was already established by the 6th century BC, and its roots can be traced at the end of the 8th century BC, through the lost epic poem of Nostoi, which would have reached the region from around the time of its main composition, with wandering aoidoi who traveled and recited epic poems throughout the Greek-speaking world. According to Malkin, their founding myth may have arisen as a response to the self-definitions of the Molossians and Thesprotians. According to Hernandez, among the Epirote tribes, the Molossians viewed their descent as a mixture of Greek and Trojan, from Neoptolemus and Helenus respectively, whereas the Chaonians viewed their descent as strictly Trojan, from Helenus and Andromache; perhaps in opposition to the Greek ethnicity of the colonizers and/or the mixed origins of the southern Epirote tribes.

In Virgil's Aeneid, Chaon is described as a Trojan hero and the eponymous ancestor of the Chaonians. The story is unclear as to whether he was the friend or the brother of Helenus, but in either case, he accompanied him to the court of Neoptolemus. The story concerning Chaon's death is as unclear as that of his relationship to Helenus. Chaon was either killed in a hunting accident or offered himself as a sacrifice to the gods during an epidemic, thus saving the lives of his countrymen. In either case, when Helenus became the ruler of the country, he named a part of the kingdom after Chaon. According to Chanteli, even though the Aeniad was written between 29 and 19 BC, this myth originated after the Macedonian Wars, and has its roots at least in the 2nd century BC. She explains it as an attempt of the Romans to better associate themselves with the Chaonians through a common Trojan origin (like the former had through Aeneas), and second, to disassociate them ideologically from the Molossians (and consequently the pro-Macedonian faction), since Helenus – being the Chaonian mythical progenitor – is presented as a mere slave of Neoptolemus (progenitor of the Molossians) who only came to power after his death.

== List of Chaonians ==
- Photius and Nicanor, leaders of the Chaonians in the Peloponnesian War (circa 431–421 BC).
- Doropsos Δόροψος, theorodokos in Epidauros (circa 365 BC).
- Antanor (son of Euthymides), proxenos in Delphi (325–275 BC).
- -petos, the Chaonian (Chaona) Peukestian (Peukestos), proxenos in Thyrrheion, Acarnania (3rd century BC) -πητοῦ Χάονα Πευκεστόν, Σωτι-.
- Myrtilos, officer who gave proxeny decree to Boeotian Kallimelos (late 3rd century BC).
- Boiskos (son of Messaneos), prostates (late 3rd century BC).
- Lykidas (son of Hellinos), prostates (circa 232–168 BC).
- -tos (son of Lysias), winner in Pale (wrestling) Panathenaics (194/193 BC).
- Charops, father of Machatas, father of Charops the Younger - philoroman politicians (2nd century BC).

== See also ==
- Tribes of Epirus
- Dexari
- Omphales
- Parauaea
