= Chameria Battalion =

The Chameria battalion (Albanian: Batalioni Çamëria) was a battalion of the National Anti-Fascist Liberation Army of Albania during the Second World War. It was formed from the organized resistance groups of Cham Albanians on 15 June 1943 and was renamed as the IV Chameria Group (Albanian: Grupi IV Çamëria) in October 1943, which ceased to exist after the Liberation of Albania. It included at the time of its creation more than 500 armed troops, the vast majority of whom were Albanians from the Greek part of Chameria region and the rest from the Albanian part, and about 40 members of the Greek minority in Albania.

== Background ==
On April 7, 1939, Italian troops invaded Albania. The operation was led by General Alfredo Guzzoni. Despite some stubborn resistance by some patriots, especially at Durrës, the Italians made short work of the Albanians. Durrës was captured on April 7, Tirana the following day, Shkodër and Gjirokastër on April 9, and almost the entire country by April 10. Unwilling to become an Italian puppet, King Zog, his wife, Queen Geraldine Apponyi, and their infant son Leka fled to Greece and eventually to London. On April 12, the Albanian parliament voted to depose Zog and unite the nation with Italy "in personal union" by offering the Albanian crown to Victor Emmanuel III.

== Formation and renaming ==
On 15 June 1943, members of unorganized resistance groups in Southern Albania and Northwestern Greece decided to create the Chameria battalion, during the meeting of the Regional Committee of the National Anti-fascist Liberation Army in Konispol. The decision was adopted on June 30, 1943, when three resistance groups were united. These groups included the Tahsini group based in Konispol, the Father Stathi Melani group based in Filiates, and the Alush Taka group based in Paramithia. Each group numbered about 170-180 members, from which only 75 were not Cham Albanians, of whom 35 were Albanians from Delvinë and 40 were members of the Greek minority in Albania.

This battalion was the first large partisan organization in the Gjirokastër County (which at that time included Gjirokastër, Sarandë and Delvinë districts) and head as leader Haki Rushit Shehu from Konispol and as group leaders, Taho Mehmet Sejko from Filiates, Lefter Miço Talo from Hajdëraga (today Lefter Talo), Ali Demi from Filiates and as political commissar, Qazim Kondi from Kuçi.

On October 10, 1943, the battalion was renamed as IV Chameria Group , which had more than 2 thousand troops, about half of them were Cham Albanians, and the rest Albanians and Greeks from southern Albania. In 1944, the XIX Assault Brigade was created on the basis of the IV Partisan Group, encompassing most of its units.

== Contribution to the war ==
Chameria battalion was one of the main contributors in resistance to Italian and German forces in southern Albania. Four major battles are recorded to this battalion. At the end of 1943, a group of Cham Albanians, led by Ali Demi, attacked a German garrison, in Vlora, Albania, killing 39 German troops and losing 12 members of the battalion, including Ali Demi himself.

The second major operation was after September 8, 1943, when Italy capitulated, Chameria battalion entered Delvinë and disarmed the local regiment of the Italian Army, on September 12, 1943.

The Italian source (G. Bonomi - Sacrificio italiano in terra albanese - La Prora; T. Scanagatta - Gli ultimi trenta giorni della divisione "Perugia" - Hoepli; and others) reports that on September 12, 1943 in Delvine there was only the 2nd battalion of 129 Infantry Regiment "Perugia". Not the whole regiment. And the battalion left Delvine, full armed, to "Argirocastro" called back from the Commander of the Division Gen. Chiminello. The same for the 3rd battalion in Giorgiokat.

The third operation was in the region between Konispol and Sagiada, on the next day, when they tried to disarm the local regiment of the Italian army in Saranda. They were forced to back in Sagiada by the Italian army, but in a counter-offensive managed to seize the regiment, disarm them and take all army equipments of the regiment in Saranda.

The same Italian source reports that In Saranda on September 13, 1943 there was no Regiment but 3.500 Italian soldier from many different corps. All of them left to Corfù 09/13/1943. There was no fight with the Chameria Battalion.

The fourth and final major operation occurred in the end October 1, 1943, when Chameria battalion managed to trap a squadre of German troops in the road between Filiates and Konispol and killed 12 Germans, taking their equipments. After being transformed into the IV Chameria Group, its members took part in operations of the VI, VII, VIII and XII brigades of the Albanian National Liberation Army not only in Albania, but also in Kosovo, Montenegro and current North Macedonia.

== Aftermath ==
=== IV "Ali Demi" battalion ===
In 1944, Greek People's Liberation Army asked Cham Albanians living in Greece to create a battalion and to enlist in its ranks. Having a good relation with the Albanian Army, ELAS's and NAFLA's officers managed to persuade Chams to create armed forces under the ELAS army.

In May 1944, a group of local Cham Albanians, under the lead of Chameria battalion soldiers created the battalion named after Ali Demi, in the village Milea (Albanian: Kastanjë), which was included in the 15th regiment of Greek People's Liberation Army. At the time of its creation, it comprised 460 partisans, consisting of both Cham Albanians and Greeks. "Ali Demi" battalion was the second largest of ELAS in the area of Epirus.

Being formed at the end of the war, the battalion had no considerable contribution in the liberation of Greece. More than 60 Chams were killed during a battle with German forces in Igoumenitsa. Other Cham Albanians were enlisted in VI, VII, IX and XI brigade of Greek People's Liberation Army, and fought in different mixed battalions of ELAS.

=== After the war ===
In an attempt to establish an ethnically pure border region, the Chams were evicted from northern Greece by guerrilla forces under the command of General Napoleon Zervas acting under the instructions of allied officers. Muslim Cham Albanians that fled in Albania, were organised as refugees by the communist-led Albanian government. They formed a congress in 1946, adopted a memorandum, accused Greece for their persecution, and asked the international community to react in order to return to their homeland and to acquire reparations. After their expulsion, these vets of ELAS, and the Cham Albanians from Greece, who took part in Chameria battalion formed in Albania the National Anti-Fascist Cham Committee, which was disbanded in 1947, when Cham Albanians lost their refugee status.

== See also ==
- Expulsion of Cham Albanians
- Cham issue
- Military history of Albania during World War II
- IV "Ali Demi" battalion
