= Keramitsa =

Keramitsa Κεραμίτσα
- Community
- Location within Greece
- Coordinates: 39°40′N 20°26′E
- Country: Greece
- Administrative region: Epirus
- Regional unit: Thesprotia
- Municipality: Filiates
- Municipal unit: Filiates

Population (2021)
  - Community: 107
- Time zone: UTC+2 (EET)
  - Summer (DST): UTC+3 (EEST)

Keramitsa (Greek: Κεραμίτσα) is a village and a community in the regional unit of Thesprotia, Epirus, Greece. Since the 1997 Kapodistrias reform, it is part of the municipality of Filiates. It is perched at 620m, halfway up Mount Velouna, in the rugged mountains of Eastern Mourgána (1806m), on the foothills of which many a bloody battle of the Greek Civil War (1943 to 1949) were fought.

It is located between the villages of Kokkinolithári, Ravení, and Maloúni, situated 22 km northeast of Filiates, 55 km west of Ioánnina, and 35 km northeast of the busy port of the regional capital, Igoumenítsa, on the Ionian Sea.

Nowadays, it's a relatively small village with approximately 100 permanent residents, including those of its hamlets - Préspa, Zovóri, and Hoúria. Not so long ago however, it was the largest regional hub, equipped with a playground, basketball court, recreation hall, primary school, high school, police station, postoffice, telecommunications office, mini market, a butcher store, and 3 taverns. It had a staggering 500 permanent residents, 100 of which resided in the aforementioned hamlets. Nevertheless, during summer this number could reach 1500 when expatriates and their descendants would visit from other parts of Greece (mostly Athens), as well as other countries: Germany, The United States, Australia, South Africa, among others.

During the 1800s, the Skala of Keramitsa, a cobbled path once part of the old Egnatia Odos was one of the biggest intersecting stations, (hánia - Inn's), on the historical trails where countless caravans supported the flow of commerce, information, and people, across a network of trade routes through the mountains covering all northern Greece. Connecting the coasts of Thesprotía with Ioánnina, Yugoslavia, Bulgaria, Romania - all the way to Moldavlachia. - Travel to Epirus, to Constantinople, to Albania and to several other parts of the Ottoman Empire — François Pouqueville (1770-1838)
