= Chaonia =

Historical region

Coordinates: 39.8778°N 20.0000°E

Chaonia (Χαονία)
- Region of Ancient Greece
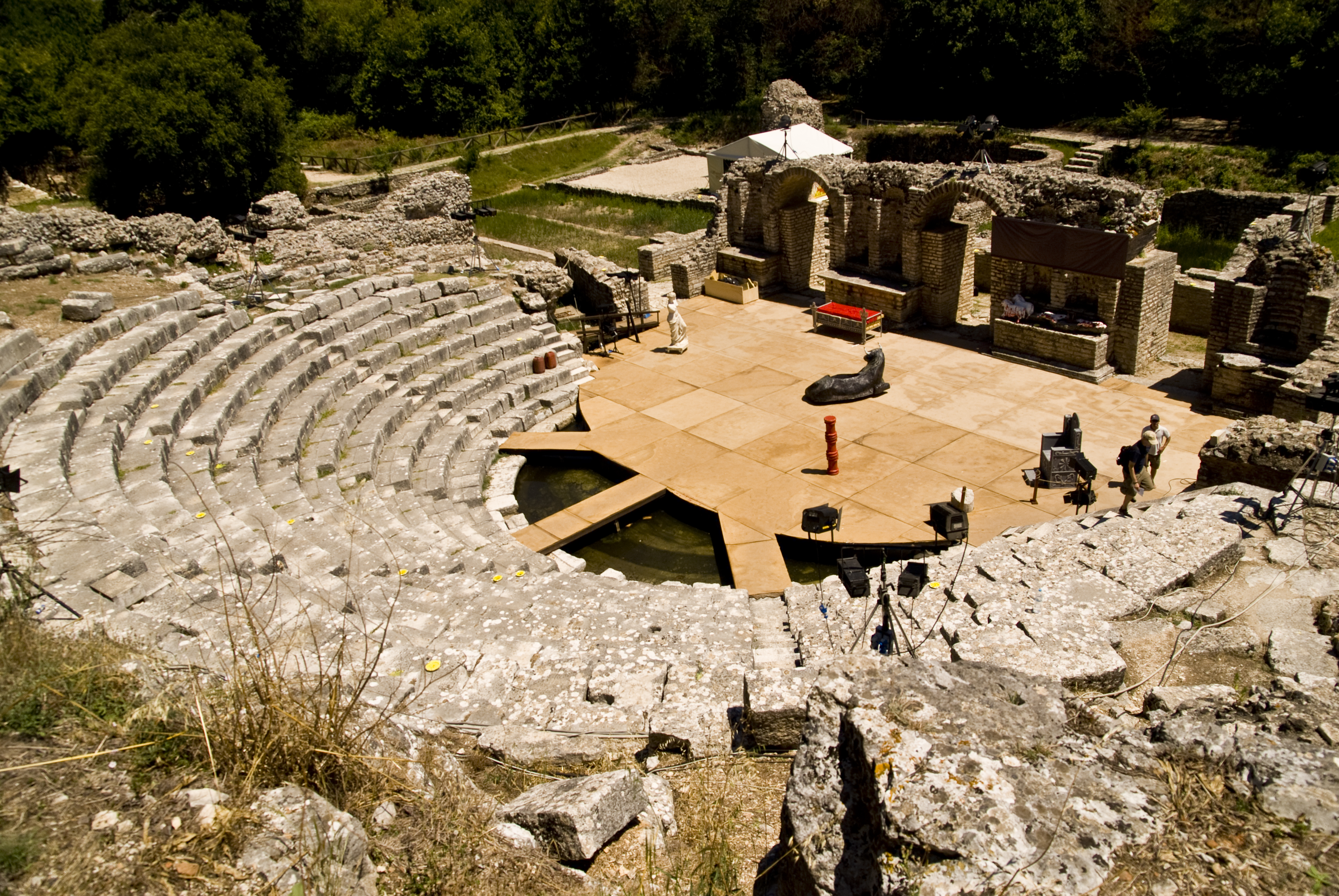
- Theatre of Buthrotum
- Location: Northern/Northwestern Epirus
- Tribal state (later subdivision of Epirus): 8th–2nd centuries BC
- Language: Northwestern Greek
- Capital: Phoenice

Chaonia or Chaon (Ancient Greek: Χαονία or Χάων) was the name of the northwestern part of Epirus, the homeland of the Epirote Greek tribe of the Chaonians. It was one of the three main areas of ethnic division of Epirus, the other being Molossia and Thesprotia.

Chaonia traditionally stretched between the Thyamis river in the south and the Akrokeraunian range in the north, between present-day Greece and Albania. Its main town was called Phoenice. In Virgil's Aeneid, Chaon was the eponymous ancestor of the Chaonians.

== Name ==
According to mythology, the eponymous ancestor of the Chaonians was Chaon. Etymologically, both the region of Χαονία 'Chaonia', and the name of its inhabitants Χάονες 'Chaones, Chaonians', derive from Χάων 'Chaon', which in turn derives from the Greek *χαϝ-ών 'place with abysses'; cf. Χάον ὄρος 'Chaon mountain' in Argolis, χάος 'chaos, space, abyss', χάσκω 'to yawn', χάσμα 'chasm, gorge'.

== Geography ==
Strabo in his Geography, places Chaonia between the Ceraunian mountains in the north and the River Thyamis in the south. The Roman historian, Appian, mentions Chaonia as the southern border in his description and geography of Illyria.

Important cities in Chaonia included Cestrine (modern Filiates), Chimaera (modern Himarë), Buthrotum, Phoenice, Cassiope (Modern Kassiopi) Panormos, Ilium (modern Despotiko) Onchesmus (modern Sarandë), Antigonia and Palaeste.

== Mythology ==
In Vigil's Aeneid, Aeneas visits Chaonia and meets Andromache and Helenus. He is told he must continue on to Italy, and instructed to meet the Sibyl concerning a more specific prophecy as to Aeneas's destiny. In another story, Cichyrus, the son of the Chaonian king, accidentally kills a girl named Anthipe while hunting a leopard, and then accidentally dies after falling off his horse down a ravine from the shock.

== See also ==
- Thesprotians
