= 4th "Ali Demi" Battalion =

The 4th "Ali Demi" Battalion (Albanian: Batallioni IV "Ali Demi", Greek: Δ' Τάγμα "Αλή Ντέμη") was a battalion under the 15th Regiment of Greek People's Liberation Army, founded during the Second World War. It comprised both from Cham Albanians and Greeks, of the region of Epirus and was established in May 1944.

== Background ==
Following the Italian invasion of Albania, the Albanian Kingdom became a protectorate of the Kingdom of Italy. The Italians used the Albanian minority in Greece, as an excuse to start the war. The final alibi was the alleged murder by Greek agents of a Cham Albanian leader. Although fascist Italy was defeated in the Greco-Italian War, a rapid German Blitzkrieg campaign followed in April 1941, and by the middle of May, Greece was under joint occupation by three Axis powers: Germany, Italy and Bulgaria. At this time Italy introduced a local administration called Këshilla in Thesprotia, which was supported by several hundred Cham Albanians. Some hundreds of Chams participated in the formation of the Ali Demi Battalion in May 1944, and the Chameria battalion According to some historians, during the World War II occupation the majority of the elites of the Cham community had become corrupted by the occupying forces and the atmosphere against the local Greeks who had suffered under Germans, Italians and Chams, led to an explosive polarization which would have constrained any motivation for joint Greek-Cham resistance.

One of the major resistance groups in Greece was the communist-led National Liberation Front (EAM), with its armed branch, the Greek People's Liberation Army (ELAS), founded on 27 September 1941. EAM evolved into the largest resistance group and the largest mass movement seen until then in Greece. ELAS initiated actions against the German and Italian forces of occupation in Greece on 7 June 1942 and it would become the resistance group in which Cham Albanians would found their battalion. Cham Albanians had been fighting the occupiers in unorganized small groups, under the lead of the National Anti-Fascist Liberation Army of Albania (NAFLA), which was created in September 1942, as the armed wing of the National Liberation Movement (NLM), inspired by the Communist Party of Albania. Later these Chams would create the "Chameria" battalion, under the Albanian Army.

== Formation ==
At the end of 1943, a group of Cham Albanians, led by Ali Demi, attacked a German garrison, in Vlora, Albania, killing 39 German troops and losing 12 members of the battalion, including Ali Demi himself. At this time, Greek People's Liberation Army, asked Cham Albanians living in Greece to create a battalion and to enlist in its ranks. Having a good relation with the Albanian Army, ELAS's and NAFLA's officers managed to persuade Chams to create armed forces under the ELAS army.

In May 1944, a group of local Cham Albanians, created the battalion named after Ali Demi, in the village Milea (Albanian: Kastanjë), which was included in the 15th regiment of Greek People's Liberation Army. The battalion consisted of 460 partisans and included Cham Albanians, Orthodox Albanians and Greeks from the Greek minority of Albania.

== Participation in the war ==
Being formed at the end of the war, the battalion had no significant contribution in fighting the occupation forces. Other Cham Albanians were enlisted in VI, VII, IX and XI brigade of Greek People's Liberation Army, and fought in different mixed battalions of ELAS. After ELAS managed to enter Epirus, the battles of the battalion were against EDES, led by Napoleon Zervas. The majority of battles occurred until 27 June 1944, when EDES forces started the ethnic cleansing of the region.

== Aftermath ==
In an attempt to establish an ethnically pure border region, the Chams were evicted from northern Greece by guerrilla forces under the command of General Napoleon Zervas acting under the instructions of allied officers. Two attacks took place in July and August with the participation of EDES Tenth Division and the local Greek peasants, eager to gain revenge for the burning of their own homes. According to Cham testimonies, which are unconfirmed by Western reports, a major massacre of Albanian Muslims by Greek irregulars occurred on 27 June 1944 in the district of Paramythia, when this forces entered the town and killed approximately 600 Muslim Chams, men, women and children. When ELAS briefly gained control of the Thesprotia region in late 1944, about four to five thousand Albanians returned to their homes. But after the Varkiza Agreement, EDES forces again expelled them, killing about 300 Muslim Cham Albanians in the process, while Orthodox Chams were allowed to stay in Greece. This region, as others in Northern Greece, became the heart of the Greek Civil War between the communist ELAS and the anti-communist forces of EDES and the Greek government, backed by the British allies.
