= Raveni =

Raveni Ραβενή
- Community
- Location within Greece
- Coordinates: 39°39′N 20°29′E
- Country: Greece
- Administrative region: Epirus
- Regional unit: Thesprotia
- Municipality: Filiates
- Municipal unit: Filiates

Population (2021)
  - Community: 73
- Time zone: UTC+2 (EET)
  - Summer (DST): UTC+3 (EEST)

Raveni (Greek: Ραβενή) is a village in Thesprotia, Greece. The village is situated on the right bank of the river Thyamis, which flows into the Ionian Sea near Sagiada. It was the ancient city of Phanote, part of the kingdom of Thesprotia. It lies in the foothills of the mountain of Mourgana, where many battles of the Greek Civil War took place after the Second World War. Raveni is part of the municipality of Filiates. Raveni is 16 km northeast of Filiates town, 26 km northeast of Igoumenitsa and 32 km west of Ioannina.

== Population ==
Historical population
Year	Pop.	±%
1981	162	—
1991	179	+10.5%
2001	100	−44.1%
2011	123	+23.0%
2021	73	−40.7%

== See also ==
- List of settlements in Thesprotia
