= Phanote =

Ancient Greek city in Epirus

Coordinates: 39°38′56″N 20°29′10″E

Epirus in antiquity

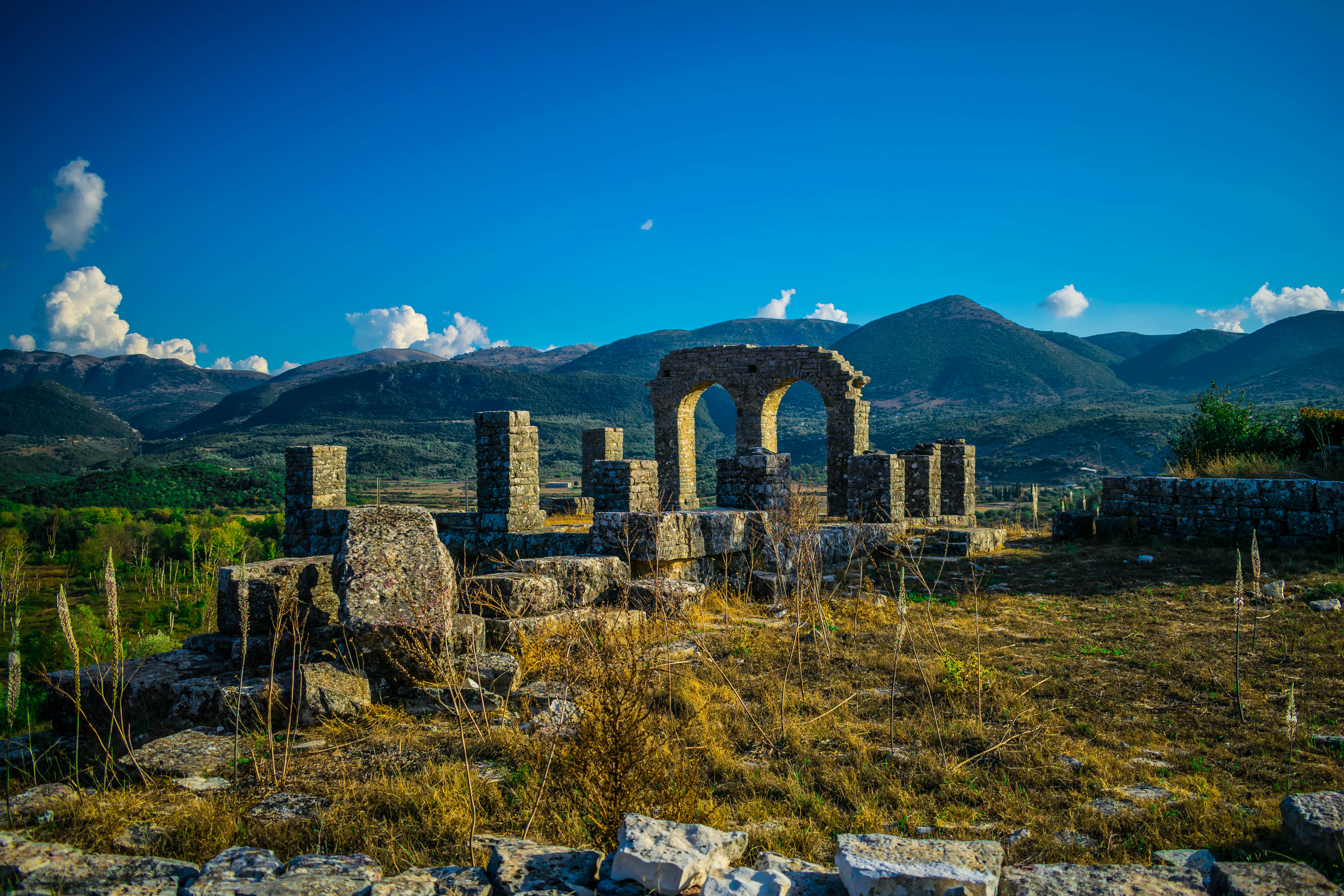
Ruins at the modern Doliani, belonging to the ancient Phanote/Phanoteia

Phanote or Phanota (Ancient Greek: Φανότη), or Phanoteia (Φανωτεία), was a strongly fortified ancient Greek town of Chaonia located in the region of Epirus. The town's location was of military/strategic importance as it stood in the midst of a valley surrounded by an amphitheatre of mountains, through which there are only two narrow passes. It lies about halfway between the sea and the Antigonean passes, and was therefore of importance to the Romans when they were advancing from Illyria in 169 BCE. Its site is tentatively located near the modern Raveni.

== See also ==
- List of cities in ancient Epirus
