= Palaiokklisi =

Palaiokklisi (Greek: Παλαιοκκλήσι) may refer to several places in Greece:

- Palaiokklisi, Karditsa, a village in the municipality of Karditsa, Karditsa regional unit
- Palaiokklisi, Thesprotia, a village in the municipality of Filiates, Thesprotia
