= Michalis Ganas =

Greek poet (1944–2024)

- Born: 17 January 1944; Tsamantas, German-occupied Greece
- Died: 12 November 2024 (aged 80); Athens, Greece
- Occupation: Poet
- Spouse: Popi Ghana
- Children: 2

Michalis Ganas or Michalis Gkanas (Greek: Μιχάλης Γκανάς; 17 January 1944 – 12 November 2024) was a Greek poet.

== Life ==
Ganas was born on 17 January 1944 in Tsamantas, a mountain village in Epirus near the Greek-Albanian border. He moved to Athens in 1962 where he studied at the law school of the University of Athens.

His poems have been set to music by renowned Greek composers including Mikis Theodorakis, Nikos Xydakis and Dimitris Papadimitriou. Singers who have sung his texts include Vassilis Lekkas, George Dalaras, Eleftheria Arvanitaki, Glykeria and Natasa Theodoridou. His poetry collections have been translated into Albanian, French, German and Italian. His poems have also been included in anthologies in several languages. In 1994 he received the Second State Poetry Prize for his work ‘Paralogi’ and in 2011 the Academy of Athens honoured him with the Poetry Prize for his entire oeuvre.
