= Cestria (Epirus) =

Town in ancient Epirus

Coordinates: 39°40′49″N 20°07′04″E

Cestria or Kestria (Ancient Greek: Κεστρία), also known as Ilium or Ilion (Ἴλιον), or Troja (Τροΐα), was a town in ancient Epirus. Its district was called Cestrine or Kestrine (Κεστρίνη) and Kestrinia (Κεστρινία), and was located in Chaonia, separated from Thesprotia by the river Thyamis. It is said to have received its name from Cestrinus, son of Helenus and Andromache, having been previously called Cammania or Kammania (Καμμανία). The principal town of the district was Cestria, but its more usual name appears to have been Ilium or Troja, in memory of the Trojan colony of Helenus. In the neighbourhood are those fertile pastures, which were celebrated in ancient times for the Cestrinic oxen. The inhabitants of the district were called Κεστρηνοί by the poet Rhianus.

The city is located near the modern Filiates, Greece.
