= Niazi Demi =

Albanian politician (1917–1977)

Niazi Rustem Demi (1919–1977) was an Albanian politician.

== Biography ==
Niazi Demi was born in 1919 in Filiates, a town of northwestern Greece located in the region of Chameria. He studied in Vlorë and then in Tirana's high school, graduating in late 1930s.

In 1942 he joined the ranks of the Albanian National Liberation Front and in 1943 became political commissar of the Berat District brigades. He was also part of the VIIth Attacking Brigade (Albanian: Brigada VII Sulmuese).

After World War II he became initially counsellor of the Albanian ambassador in the USSR and later Minister of Trade of Albania.
