= Chaon =

Chaonians in antiquity.

Chaon (Ancient Greek: Χάων, gen.: Χάονος) was a Trojan hero and the eponymous ancestor of the Chaonians in Virgil's Aeneid. The story is unclear as to whether he was the friend or the brother of Helenus, but in either case, he accompanied him to the court of Neoptolemus. Chaon's death is as unclear as that of his relationship to Helenus. Chaon was either killed in a hunting accident or offered himself as a sacrifice to the gods during an epidemic, thus saving the lives of his countrymen. In either case, when Helenus became the ruler of the country, he named a part of the kingdom after Chaon; Chaonia.

The name Χάων 'Chaon' derives from the Greek *χαϝ-ών 'place with abysses'; cf. Χάον ὄρος 'Chaon mountain' in Argolis, χάος 'chaos, space, abyss', χάσκω 'to yawn', χάσμα 'chasm, gorge'. Chaon was also a common Ancient Greek name (Chaon son of Philoumenos - Χάων Φιλουμένου, and Chaon son of Eudoxos - Χάων Εὐδόξου).
