= Tsamantas =

Village in Epirus, Greece

Tsamantas Τσαμαντάς
- Community
- Location within Greece
- Coordinates: 39°47′N 20°21′E
- Country: Greece
- Administrative region: Epirus
- Regional unit: Thesprotia
- Municipality: Filiates
- Municipal unit: Filiates

Population (2021)
  - Community: 45
- Time zone: UTC+2 (EET)
  - Summer (DST): UTC+3 (EEST)

Tsamantas (Greek: Τσαμαντάς) is a village located in Epirus. Tsamantas lies near to the border with Albania in northern Greece, in the regional unit of Thesprotia. Indeed, the Albanian border is very clearly visible from the high lofts that are Tsamantas, the highest mountain in the region.

Due to 'chain migration', many descendants of the inhabitants of Tsamantas now live in Worcester, Massachusetts, or in Melbourne, Australia, with a few others in Athens, Thessaloniki and other locales.

== Nearest places ==
- Filiates
- Vavouri
- Leshnica e Poshtme
- Leshnica e Sipërme
