= Musa Demi =

Albanian writer and activist involved in the Albanian National Awakening

Musa Demi

Musa Demi (1878–1971) was an Albanian revolutionary and writer. He was one of the main proponents of the Albanian National Awakening in the region of Filiates, Paramythia and Igoumenitsa (Çamëria).

== Life ==
Musa Demi was born in Filiates, then a town of the Ottoman Empire in 1878. His father Hamit Demi was a local landowner of the region from the Demi family of Filiates. Musa Demi's grandfather had been Çafa Demi. He graduated from the local Ottoman rüşdiye (secular state school) and then continued his studies in Ioannina.

In the early 1900s he became one of the founders of the Vëllezëria association of Filiates and was the commander of one of the most important çetë (armed guerrilla groups fighting for independence of Albanians). On August 25, 1908 along with other rilindas he opened the first Albanian-language school of Filiates. Musa Demi, Rasih Dino along with other locals provided the funds for the construction of the school building.

During World War II, he is said to have had contact with the Albanian as well as the Greek Communist Party. However, it is contested that there was a 'socialist' movement around Musa Demi during this period His daughter Ballkëze Demi fought and died during the Albanian Resistance of World War II.

He was decorated in 1945 with the Patriot of National Awakening (Albanian: Patriot i Rilindjes Kombëtare) medal. Musa Demi died in 1971. In 1978, for the 100th anniversary of the formation of the League of Prizren, he was posthumously decorated with the civil medal For Patriotic Activities (Albanian: Për Veprimtari Patriotike).
