= Milea, Thesprotia =

Milea Μηλέα
- Community
- Location within Greece
- Coordinates: 39°43′44″N 20°25′09″E
- Country: Greece
- Administrative region: Epirus
- Regional unit: Thesprotia
- Municipality: Filiates
- Municipal unit: Filiates

Population (2021)
  - Community: 10
- Time zone: UTC+2 (EET)
  - Summer (DST): UTC+3 (EEST)

Milea (Greek: Μηλέα, also romanized as Milia, Albanian: Kastanjë) before 1959: Κωστάνα - Kostana) is a village in the municipality of Filiates, Thesprotia, Greece. The population is 10 (2021 census).
