= Thyamis =

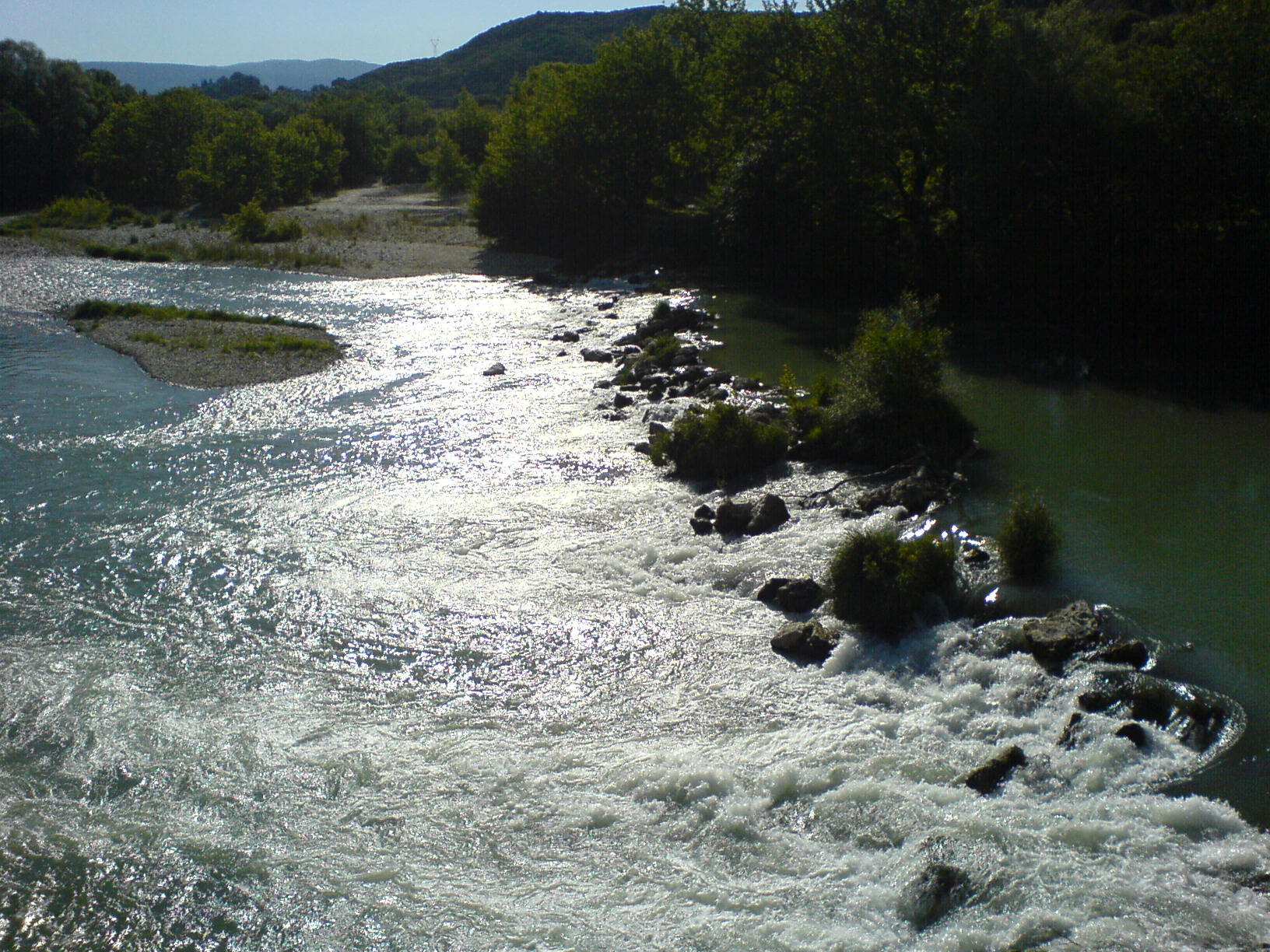

Location
- Country: Greece

Physical characteristics
- Mouth
  - location: Ionian Sea
  - coordinates: 39°35′12″N 20°8′32″E
- Length: 115 km (71 mi)
- Basin size: about 1,800 km^{2} (690 sq mi)

The Thyamis (Greek: Θύαμις), also known as Glykys (Γλυκύς) or Kalamas (Καλαμάς), is a river in the Epirus region of Greece. The 115 km (71 mi) long, river flows into the Ionian Sea while on its course it drains an area of about 1,800 km^{2} (690 sq mi), over 99% of which on Greek territory. Thyamis in ancient Greece was mentioned by Pausanias as forming the boundary between Thesprotis and Kestrine. In addition, Suda and Ptolemaeus mentioned it.

== Geography ==
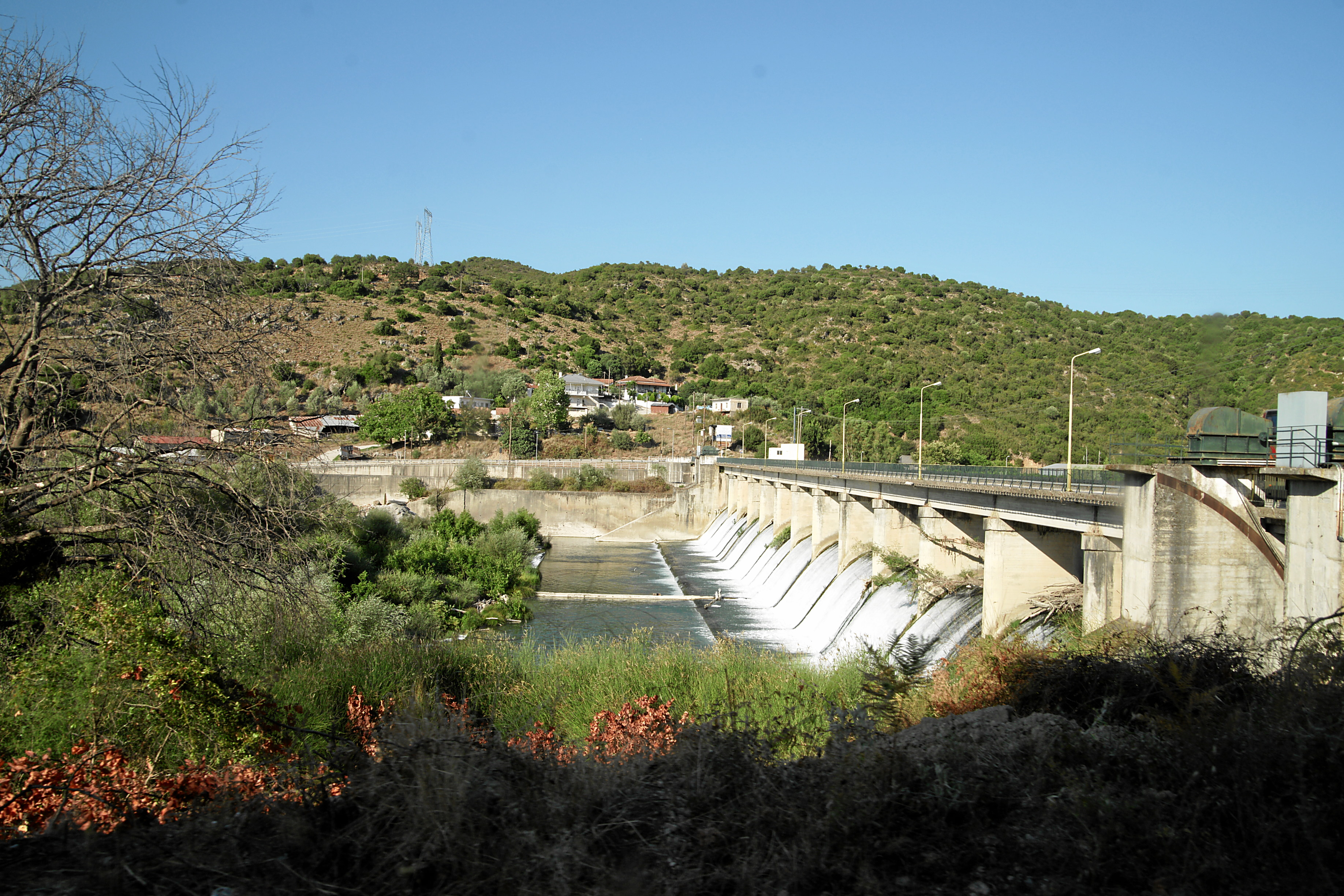
The hydroelectric dam of river Thyamis, in Thesprotia

The source of the river is near the village Kalpaki, in the northwestern part of the Ioannina regional unit. It flows south at first, and turns southwest near Soulopoulo. It receives its tributary Tyria near Vrosina, and turns west near Kyparisso in Thesprotia, where the hydroelectric dam is located. It empties into the Ionian Sea near the village Kestrini, between Igoumenitsa and Sagiada, close to the Albanian border.

Places along the river include, from source to mouth: Mazaraki, Soulopoulo, Vrosina, Raveni, Pente Ekklisies, Kyparisso, Parapotamos and Kestrini.

During the interwar period of the 20th century, Albanian speaking villages of the Thyamis delta and river basin were small and scattered compared to the upland larger Greek villages of the hilly area to the north.

== Environment ==
Thyamis forms a river delta where it empties in the Ionian Sea, north of Igoumenitsa. The delta is known for being rich in flora and migrating birds stop in its waters for food and rest.

The river, however, has suffered from environmental degradation for decades, due to uncontrolled human activities (farming activity, urban and industrial effluents and waste, lack of management plan and poor coordination of competent authorities for its protection).

== See also ==
- Battle of Elaia–Kalamas
- List of rivers of Europe
- List of rivers of Greece
