= Sagiada =

Sagiada Σαγιάδα
- Municipal unit
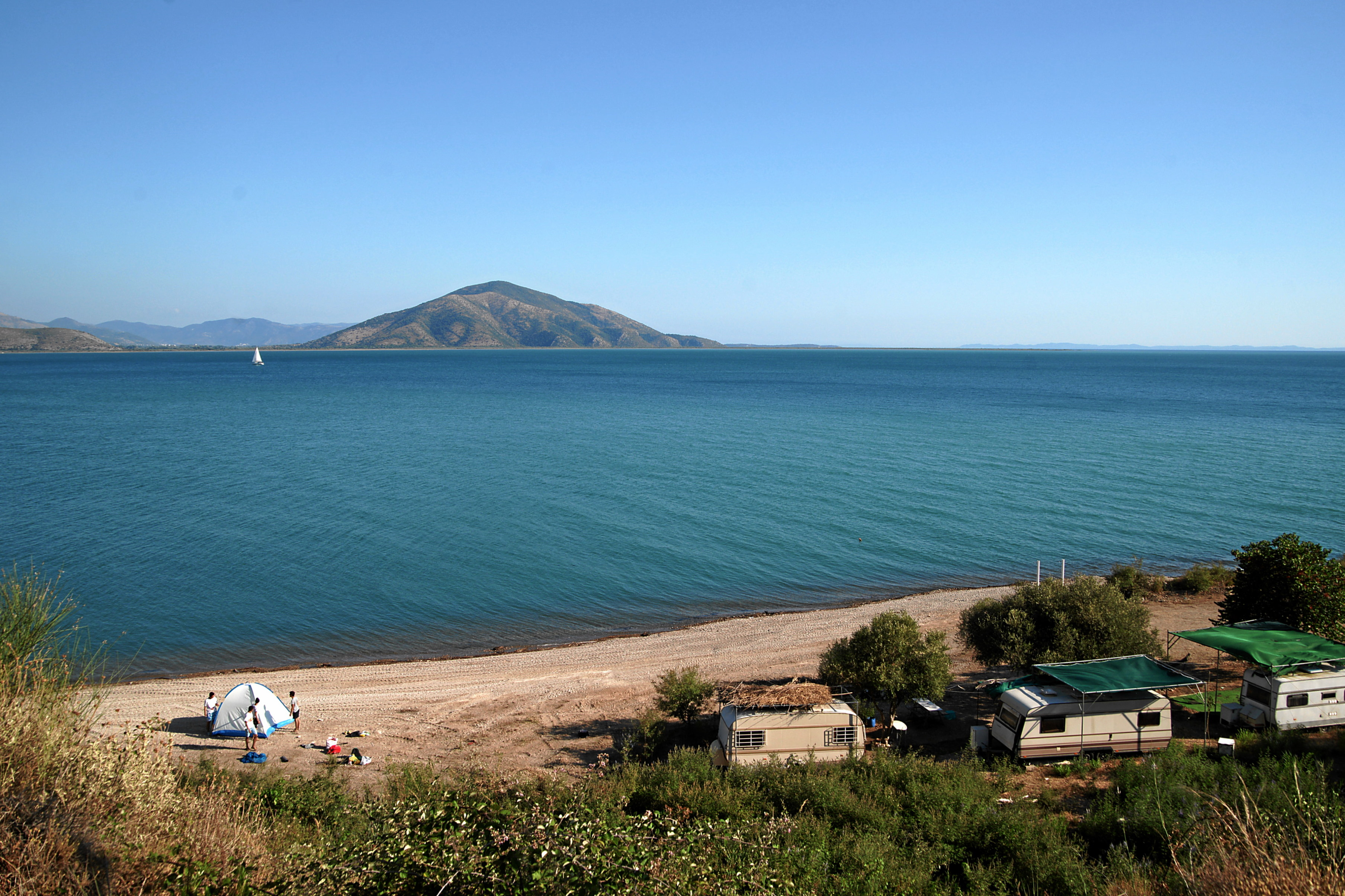
- Beach of Sagiada

- Location within the regional unit

- Location within Greece
- Coordinates: 39°38′N 20°11′E
- Country: Greece
- Administrative region: Epirus
- Regional unit: Thesprotia
- Municipality: Filiates

Area
  - Municipal unit: 87.8 km^{2} (33.9 sq mi)

Population (2021)
  - Municipal unit: 1,580
  - Municipal unit density: 18.0/km^{2} (46.6/sq mi)
  - Community: 515
- Time zone: UTC+2 (EET)
  - Summer (DST): UTC+3 (EEST)
- Vehicle registration: ΗΝ

Sagiada (Greek: Σαγιάδα) is a village and a former municipality in Thesprotia, Epirus, Greece. Since the 2011 local government reform it is part of the municipality Filiates, of which it is a municipal unit. The municipal unit has an area of 87.803 km^{2}. In 2021 its population was 515 for the village and 1,580 for the municipal unit. The seat of the municipality was in Asprokklisi.

== Location ==
Sagiada stretches between the Ionian Sea to the west and Albania to the north. It is the westernmost point of mainland Greece. The river Thyamis flows into sea 4 km south of the village Sagiada. There are plains in the southern part of the municipal unit, and mountains on the Albanian border. The village Sagiada is 10 km west of Filiates, 15 km northwest of the capital of Thesprotia, Igoumenitsa, and 4 km south of the Albanian town of Konispol.

== History ==
In the late medieval era (14th century) the fort of Sagiada and its lucrative salt mines was contested among various local lords and the Angevins from Corfu. In 1386 it was captured by Gjon Zenebishi, an Albanian lord from Gjirokaster. However, in 1387 it passed to Esau de' Buondelmonti of the Despotate of Epirus. Essau had refortified a ruined tower there and constructed some salt-pans nearby. The Venetian Republic saw this as a threat to its trade network and demanded its destruction with the excuse that the area once belonged to Venice. Zenevisi retook control in 1399 as he claimed in the final agreement with the Venetians that they belonged to his ancestors. After his death it came under the control of the Venetian Republic (1418).

Sagiada is recorded in the 1431 Ottoman Arvanid defter, as part of the nahiye/vilayet of Vagenetia in the Sanjak of Albania as one of the villages whose tax rights were given to timar holders. In 1473 the illustrious man (egregius vir) Johannes Volassi (or Vlassi) temporarily captured Sagiada and various surrounding Ottoman controlled regions after approval from Venice.

In the 16th century, the region was harassed by the Venetians and the inhabitants of Venetian Corfu in violation of the Ottoman-Venetian treaty of 1540 who were offering lower prices to merchants in order for them to use the ports of Corfu instead of Sagiada. In 1566, Sagiada is described as small village with 30 households inhabited by Albanians (habitato puro de albanesi). In the late 18th era, Sagiada (in Albanian, Sajadha) was a small port in the northern parts of the territories of the Cham Albanians. Athanasios Psalidas (1767–1829), counselor of Ali Pasha of Ioannina noted that the town was inhabited by an ethnic Greek community. Sagiada was the port of Filiates and as trade expanded from 1675 to 1706 consuls of England, Holland and Venice responsible for communication with the inland regions resided in Sagiada.

During the late Ottoman period (1820–1913), Sagiada was among the Greek speaking areas on the coastal part of Chameria. At 1875 a vice consulate of Greece was already established in Sagiada. At 1893 two ground level Greek schools were operating in the town.

During World War II the town of Sagiada was primarily inhabited by a Greek population. In August 1943 it was burnt to the ground units by a joint operation by Nazi German units of the 1st Mountain Division and Cham Albanian units of collaborators, like many other settlements in the region. The complete destruction of the town was perpetrated as part of reprisals against supposed guerrilla activity. After the war new settlement was built near the coast. After WWII and the expulsion of Cham Albanians, like many other settlements, it was partially repopulated by an Aromanian-speaking community.

The survivors of the 1943 destruction were forced to move to the adjacent coast, where the new settlement was built after the end of World War II. The old town has been declared a protected area.

== Subdivisions ==
The former municipal unit of Sagiada was subdivided into the following communities:

- Sagiada
- Asprokklisi
- Kestrini
- Ragi
- Smertos

== Sources ==
- Balta, Evangelia; Oğuz, Mustafa; Yaşar, Filiz (2011). "Εthnic and Religious Composition of Ottoman Thesprotia in the 15th to 17th centuries". In Forsén, Björn; Tikkala, Esko (eds.). Thesprotia Expedition II. Environment and Settlement Patterns. Foundation of the Finnish Institute at Athens. ISBN 978-952-67211-2-5.
- Isufi, Hajredin (2002). Musa Demi dhe qëndresa çame: 1800-1947. Botime Dudaj. ISBN 9992750103.
- Markou, Charalampos (2012). Βιοποικιλότητα και βιώσιμη ανάπτυξη σε ένα παράκτιο υγρότοπο: Η περίπτωση του δέλτα και του κάτω ρου του ποταμού Καλαμά (Ν. Θεσπρωτίας) (Thesis). University of Patras. hdl:10889/5334.
