= Filiates =

Filiates Φιλιάτες
- Municipality
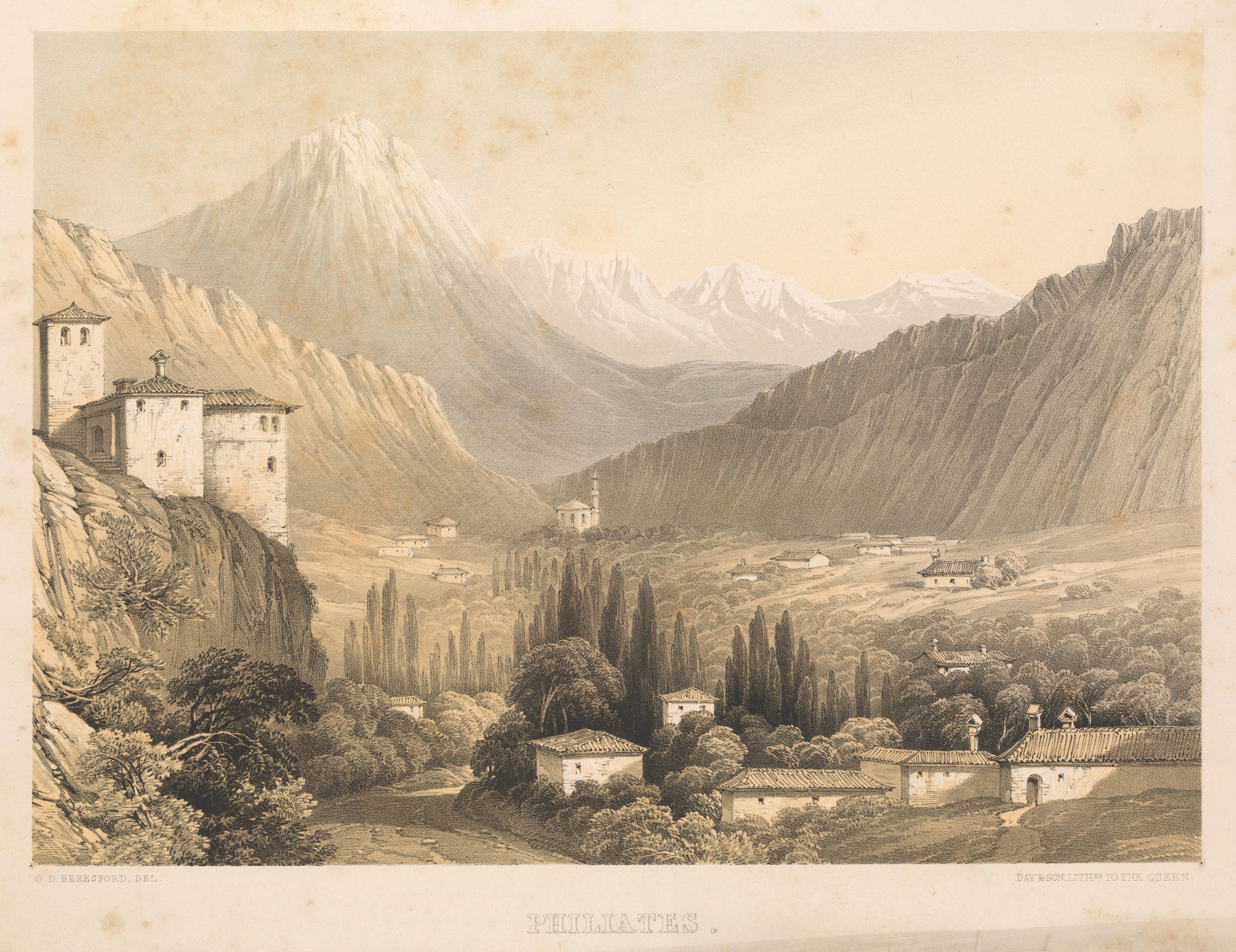

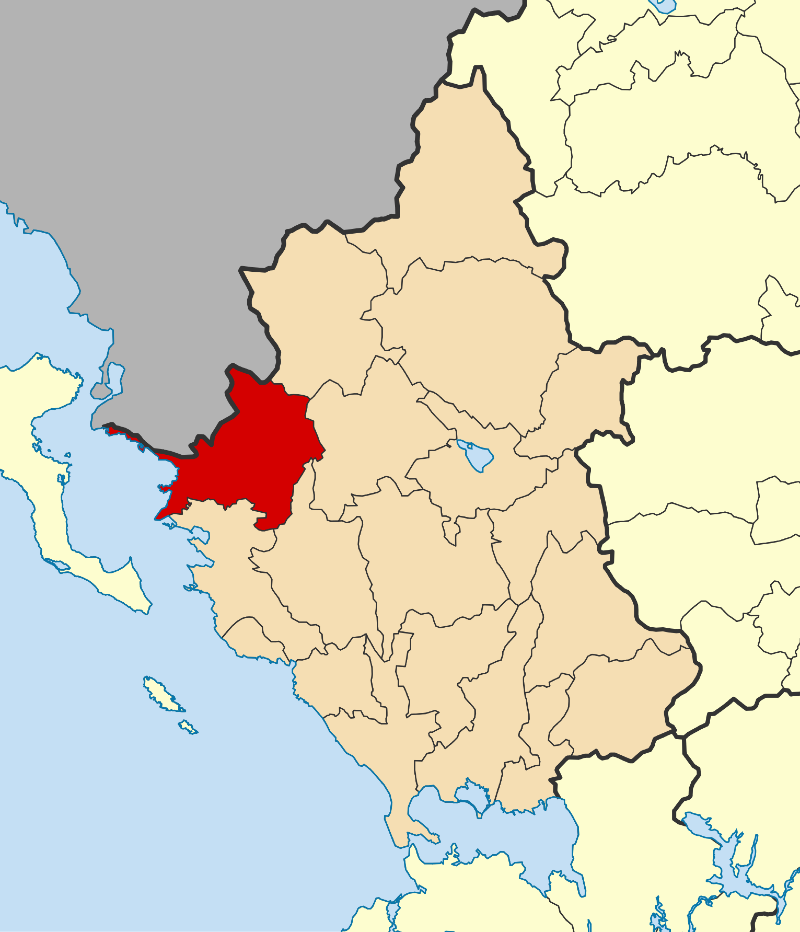

- Location within Greece
- Coordinates: 39°36′N 20°19′E
- Country: Greece
- Administrative region: Epirus
- Regional unit: Thesprotia

Area
  - Municipality: 583.5 km^{2} (225.3 sq mi)
  - Municipal unit: 495.7 km^{2} (191.4 sq mi)

Population (2021)
  - Municipality: 6,347
  - Density: 10.88/km^{2} (28.17/sq mi)
  - Municipal unit: 4,767
  - Municipal unit density: 9.617/km^{2} (24.91/sq mi)
  - Community: 2,244
- Time zone: UTC+2 (EET)
  - Summer (DST): UTC+3 (EEST)
- Vehicle registration: ΗΝ

Filiates (Greek: Φιλιάτες; Albanian: Filat/-i) is a town and a municipality in Thesprotia, Greece. It is located in the northernmost part of the regional unit, bordering western Ioannina regional unit and southern Albania.

== Name ==
The region of Filiates was known as Cestrine prior to the Ottoman period. The region is named for the ancient town of Cestria, in ancient Epirus, other ancient names for which were Cammania, Ilion, Epirus, and Troia; the site of ancient Cestria is probably over the Albanian frontier. The modern name Filiates is the result of the conversion of a surname. According to Johann Georg von Hahn, Eqrem Çabej, Idriz Ajeti and Ali Dhrimo, the toponym Filat contains the Albanian suffix -at, widely used to form toponyms from personal names and surnames. According to Konstantinos Giakoumis, it applies to a certain Filios (diminutive of Theofilos) with the addition of the Greek ending -άτες or -άταις. Local tradition from the 19th century documents a person named Filios; he was a farrier and allegedly the first inhabitant of Filiates. Athanasios Petrides and Dimitrios Kampouroglou opined that the name descends from the Latin word filius.

Filiates is known as Filat in Albanian and Ottoman Turkish.

== Geography ==
Filiates is located in a largely mountainous area. The Mourgana mountains lie to the north, on the border with Albania. Filiates is located southwest of Konitsa, west of Ioannina, northeast of Igoumenitsa and southeast of Sarandë, Albania. The Greek National Road 6 (Larissa - Ioannina - Igoumenitsa) and the A2 motorway (Alexandroupoli - Thessaloniki - Ioannina - Igoumenitsa) pass south of the municipal unit.

The municipal unit Filiates has a land area of 495.727 km^{2} and a population of 4,676 (2021 census). The population of the community Filiates, one of the biggest towns in the area, was 2,244. The largest other villages in the municipal unit are Keramítsa (pop. 107), Palaiochóri (153), Vrysélla (253), Leptokaryá (171), Trikóryfon (174), Aetos (134), Keramitsa (107) and Kyparisso (118). The municipal unit has a total of 42 communities.

Because of its high altitude (~850m) location on a west-facing slope, Filiates has one of the wettest climates in Greece.

=== Municipality ===
The present municipality Filiates was formed at the 2011 local government reform by the merger of the following 2 former municipalities, that became municipal units (constituent communities in brackets):

- Filiates (Achladea, Aetos, Agios Nikolaos, Agioi Pantes, Ampelonas, Anavryto, Charavgi, Faneromeni, Filiates, Foiniki, Gardiki, Giromeri, Gola, Kallithea, Kato Xechoro, Kefalochori, Keramitsa, Kerasochori, Kokkinia, Kokkinolithari, Kouremadi, Kryoneri, Kyparisso, Leptokarya, Lia, Lista, Malouni, Milea, Palaiochori, Palaiokklisi, Palampas, Pigadoulia, Plaisio, Platanos, Raveni, Rizo, Sideri, Trikoryfo, Tsamantas, Vavouri, Vrysella, Xechoro)
- Sagiada (Asprokklisi, Kestrini, Ragi, Sagiada, Smertos)

The municipality has an area of 583.530 km^{2}, the municipal unit 495.727 km^{2}.

The province of Filiates (Greek: Επαρχία Φιλιατών) was one of the provinces of Thesprotia. It had the same territory as the present municipality. It was abolished in 2006.

== History ==
=== Ancient history ===
In antiquity, the area of Filiates was inhabited by the Epirot Greek tribe of the Chaonians. In antiquity the area round the city was known as Cestrine (or Kestrine) (Greek: Κεστρίνη), separated from Thesprotia by the River Thyamis. The region was named from the ancient town of Cestria, which was also known as Cammania, Cestria, Filiates, Ilion, Epirus, Troy, Epirus and Troia, Epirus. According to Pausanias (Description of Greece), Cestrine took its name from Cestrinus, the son of Helenus, having previously borne the appellation of Cammania. The site of the ancient town of Cestria probably lies over the Albanian border.

=== Medieval and modern history ===
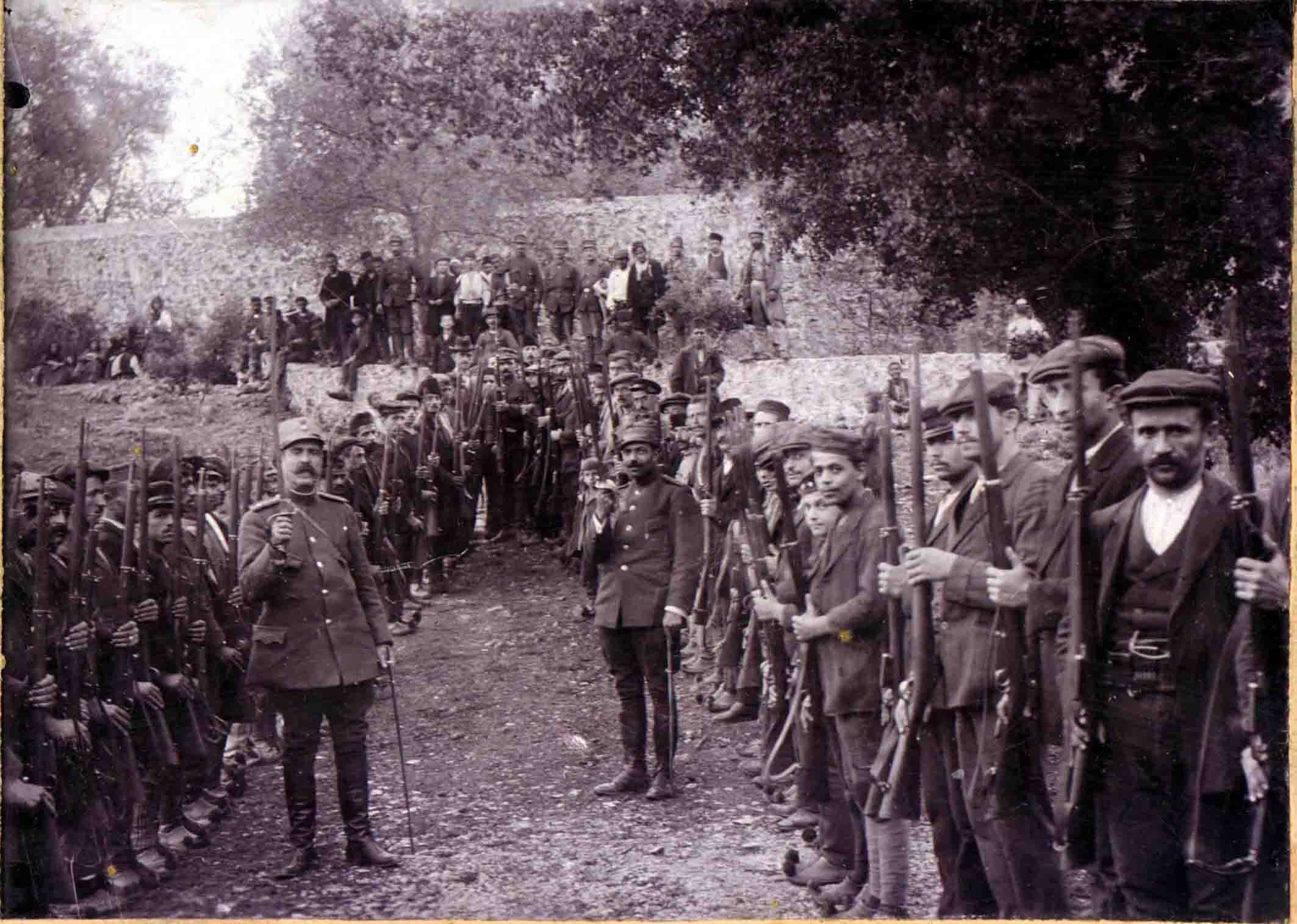
Officers of the Greek Army with local volunteers, during the Balkan Wars

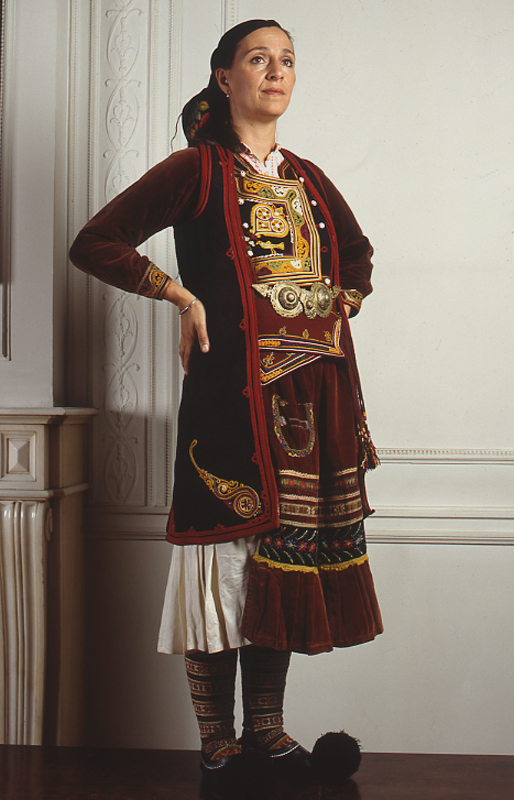
Traditional dress from Agioi Pantes, Filiates municipality (PFF's collection).

In 15th century Filiates came under Ottoman rule and became part of Sanjak of Ioannina. During 17th and 18th century Ottoman rule a significant part of the town's population converted to Islam. According to Panagiotis Aravantinos (1856), who visited the region, there were 200 Muslim and 30 Christian families in Filiates. Vassilis Zotos (1878), reported that there were about 500 Muslim families and 100 Christian families in Filiates with a total population of 4,000 people (3,000 Muslims and 1,000 Christians).

During the suppression of the Greek revolt of 1854 in Epirus by the Ottoman authorities armed groups of Cham Albanians inflicted extensive damage to the town.

In 1907, Qamil Çami also starting working as a teacher and teaching written Albanian secretly. On August 25, 1908, along with other rilindas opened the first Albanian-language school of Filiates and became its headmaster. The funds were provided by the people of Filiates, such as Musa Demi, rilindas of the area and by other notable Cham Albanians like Rasih Dino, son of Abedin Dino.

In 1911 during the period of the dissolution of the Ottoman Empire, Albanians of Filiates formed çetes, armed guerilla groups fighting for autonomy from the Ottoman Empire. On the other hand, the local Greek population displayed tolerance towards actions by the Albanians that didn't reveal chauvinist inclinations.

Population movements to the town that occurred from the middle of the 19th century weakened the Muslim elite and led to the gradual Hellenization of former Albanian-majority towns in the area such as Filiates in the 1920s. During the interwar period, Filiates was mainly an Albanian-speaking small town that after 1939 increasingly became Greek-speaking. In 1930, a Cham Albanian committee from Filiates requested to the Greek government for the use of Albanian in public schools, for its use to be allowed among students and for the right to open private schools in Filiates. The inhabitants of Filiates then went on and submitted their petition to the League of Nations without success.

In 1928, representatives from the Cham Albanian communities in Paramythia, Karvounari and Filiates, requested the opening of two Muslim schools which they would fund themselves. The Greek authorities officially rejected the request, fearing that these Muslim schools would serve Albanian state propaganda by promoting an anti-Greek sentiment among the Chams of Greece. Regardless, the Greek government allowed their operation unofficially because it could close them as illegal at any time, and could also claim that their function fulfilled demands for Albanian schools in Chameria.

During the Greek-Italian War the town of Filiates was burned by collaborationist Cham Albanian bands (October 28-November 14, 1940). Filiates region was until 1944, home to a Cham Albanian community. Almost the entire population of them fled during the liberation of Greece, because a large part of the community collaborated with Nazi forces. In September 1944, during the Axis withdrawal, the EDES resistance managed to quickly overcome the remaining Cham collaborator units stationed in the town. After the initial chaos and destruction that lasted for five days, the town's Cham community fled to Albania. The Cham leaders had managed to retreat together with the German troops. Almost all Cham Albanian monuments of Filiates were destroyed during World War II.

== Population ==
Year	Village	Community	Municipal unit	Municipality
1981	2,439	-	-	-
1991	2,591	-	-	-
2001	2,246	2,344	8,288	-
2011	2,512	2,639	5,970	7,710
2021	-	2,244	4,767	6,347

== Notable people ==
- Anthimus VII of Constantinople (1835–1913), Ecumenical Patriarch.
- Osman Taka, Albanian dancer and rebel
- Qamil Çami, teacher and poet of era of the Albanian National Awakening.
- Ali Demi, Albanian resistance fighter (World War II).
- Musa Demi, revolutionary and important figure of the Albanian National Awakening.
- Niazi Demi, minister of trade of Albania.
- Rexhep Demi, leading member of the Albanian independence movement and signatory of the Albanian Declaration of Independence.
- Tahir Demi, high-ranking member of the Party of Labour of Albania and representative of Albania at Comecon.
- Nicholas Gage, Greek American author and investigative journalist.
- Vassiliki Kontaxi, Greek wife of Ali Pasha and member of the patriotic organization Filiki Eteria
- Fanis Moulios, Greek poet and writer.
- Alekos Papadopoulos, Greek lawyer and politician.
- Ioannis Papakostas, Greek revolutionary and participant of Second Boer War, Balkan Wars and the autonomist struggle of Northern Epirus.

== See also ==
- List of cities in ancient Epirus

== Sources ==
- Baltsiotis, Lambros (2009). The Muslim Chams from their entry into the Greek state until the start of the Greco-Italian war (1913-1940): the story of a community from millet to nation [Οι μουσουλμάνοι Τσάμηδες από την είσοδό τους στο ελληνικό κράτος μέχρι την έναρξη του ελληνοϊταλικού πολέμου (1913-1940): η ιστορία μιας κοινότητας από το millet στο έθνος] (Thesis). University of Panteion.
