= Thesprotia =

Thesprotia Περιφερειακή ενότητα Θεσπρωτίας
- Regional unit
- Municipalities of Thesprotia

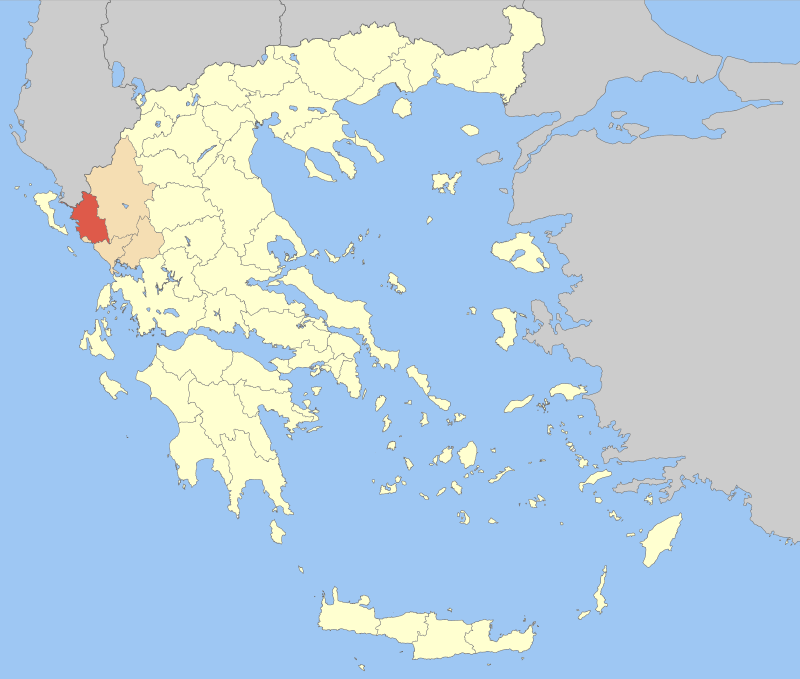
- Thesprotia within Greece

- Location within Greece
- Coordinates: 39°35′N 20°20′E
- Country: Greece
- Administrative region: Epirus
- Seat: Igoumenitsa

Area
  - Total: 1,515 km^{2} (585 sq mi)

Population (2021)
  - Total: 40,804
  - Density: 26.93/km^{2} (69.76/sq mi)
- Time zone: UTC+2 (EET)
  - Summer (DST): UTC+3 (EEST)
- Postal code: 46x xx
- Area code: 266x0
- Vehicle registration: ΗΝ
- Website: www.thesprotia.gr

Thesprotia (/θɛsˈproʊʃə/; Greek: Θεσπρωτία, pronounced [θesproˈtia]) is one of the regional units of Greece. It is part of the Epirus region. Its capital and largest town is Igoumenitsa. Thesprotia is named after the Thesprotians, an ancient Greek tribe that inhabited the region in antiquity.

== History ==
Thesprotia was part of the proto-Greek region in the late Bronze Age in which Greek archaic toponyms are densely found.

In antiquity, the territory of modern Thesprotia was inhabited by the ancient Greek tribe of Thesprotians and was bordered by the neighboring regions of Molossia to the north and Chaonia to the east. Thesprotia is mentioned at the Epic Cycle as a place where Odysseus sailed and married the local queen Callidice of Thesprotia. Thesprotia became part of the Epirote League before it was annexed by Rome where it became part of the Roman province of Epirus. After the fragmentation of the Roman Empire into East and West, it was part of the Eastern Roman (Byzantine) Empire until the late Middle Ages, except for a period of Bulgarian rule in the 9th-11th centuries. In c. 1430 it fell to the Ottomans.

From the 8th-9th until the 15th century, the region was called Vagenetia, a name deriving from the Slavic tribe of the Baiounitai, who appear in the early 7th century during the Slavic invasions of the Balkans. In the late Ottoman period, the area was known as Chameria, and at 1910 most of the territory of the modern prefecture of Thesprotia was known as Sancak of Resadiye or Çamlık Sancak or Igoumenitsa Sancak.

Thesprotia remained under Ottoman rule until 1913, when it was ceded to Greece after the Ottoman defeat in the First Balkan War. As part of Greece the province of Margariti became part of Preveza prefecture and the provinces of Paramythia and Filiates were part of Ioannina prefecture. The area above river Acheron continued to be referred to as Tsamouria in official Greek government communication until 1937, when the separate prefecture of Thesprotia was established. In 1923, the population of Thesprotia was 60,705, In 1920, there were 20,319 Muslim Albanians in Thesprotia. After their expulsion on the orders of Napoleon Zervas at the end of World War II, Muslim Albanians numbered to only 77 individuals in the 1951 census.

== Geography and climate ==
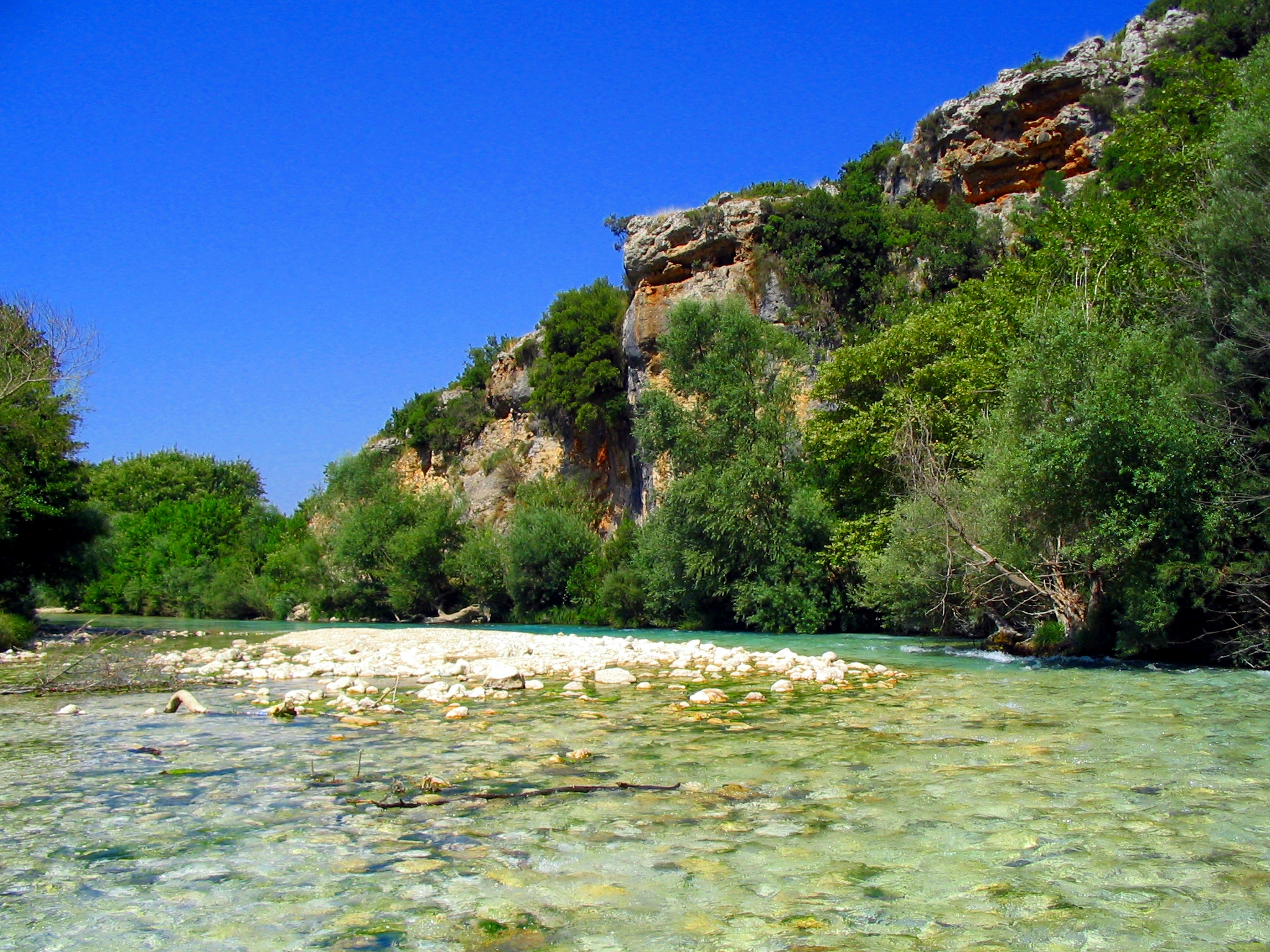
Acheron river

Thesprotia borders Albania to the north, the regional unit of Ioannina to the east and Preveza to the south. The Ionian Sea lies to the west. Much of the regional unit is mountainous. Most farmland is located in the valleys of the central, southern and western part. Two of Thesprotia's rivers are legendary: the Thyamis and the Acheron of Greek mythology, lined with reedbeds and plane trees.

Thesprotia's coastal climate is Mediterranean. Cold winters of a semi-alpine climate dominate the eastern part and higher elevations.

== Administration ==
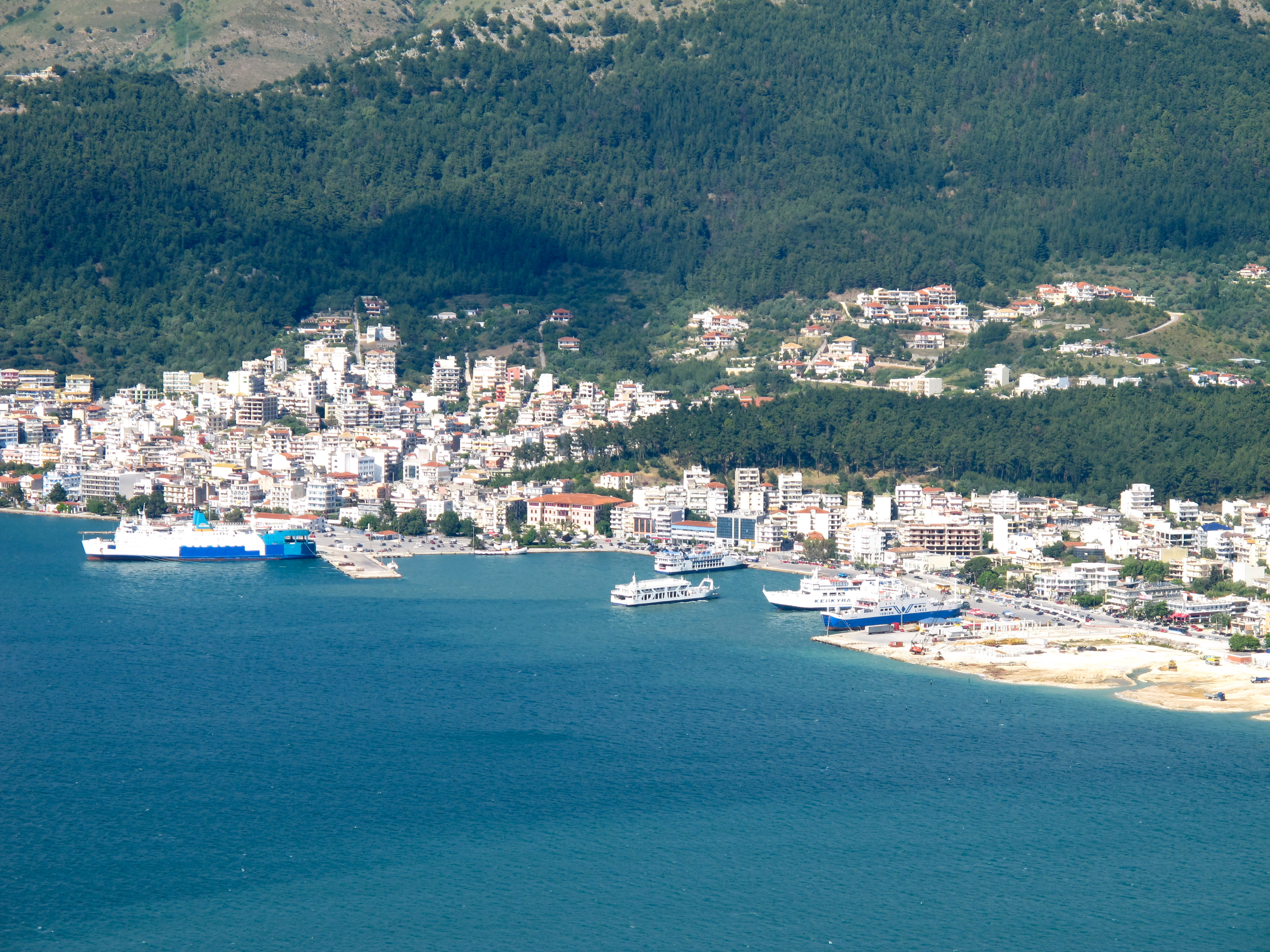
Igoumenitsa

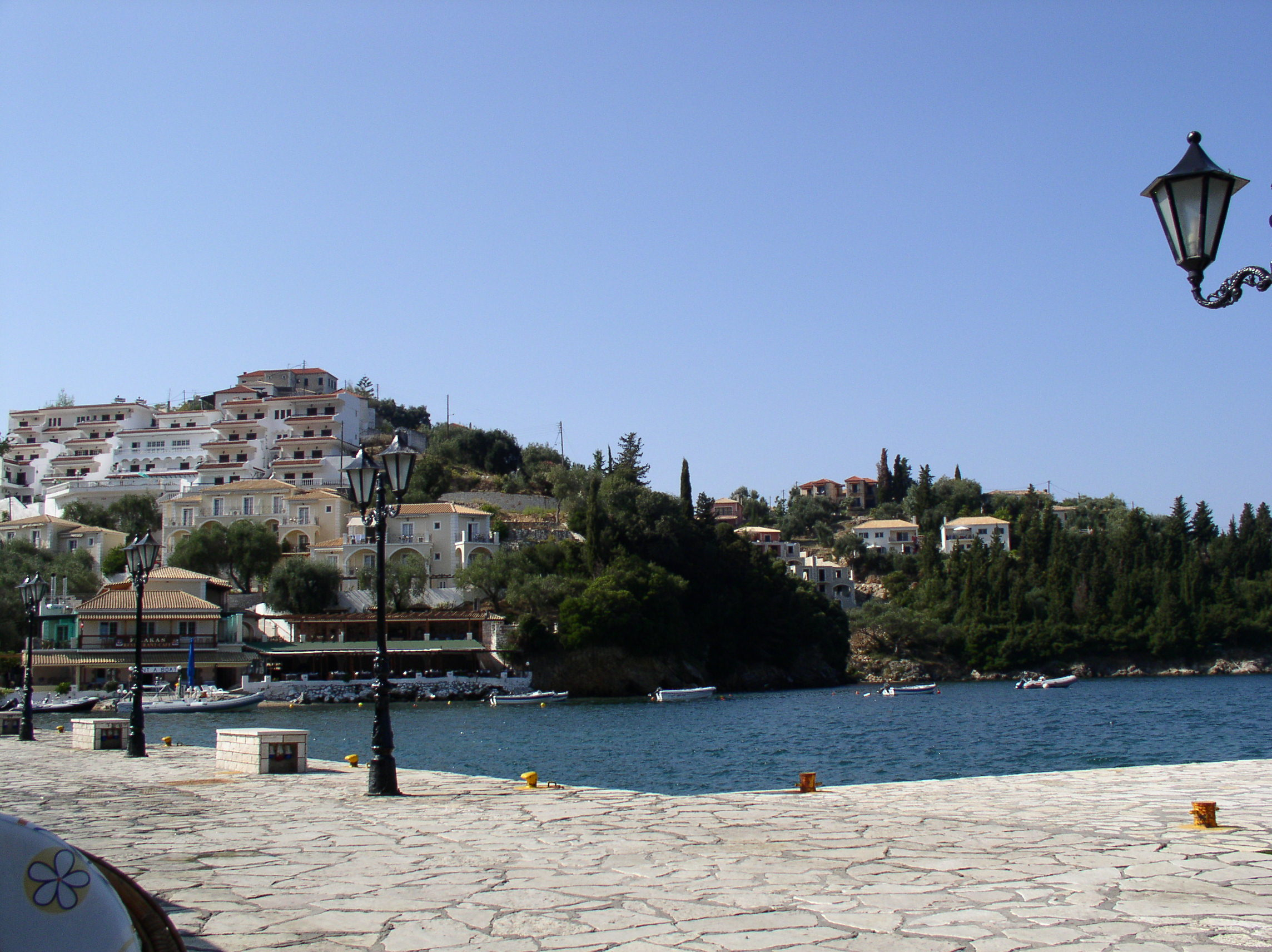
Syvota

The regional unit Thesprotia is subdivided into three municipalities (numbered as in the map in the infobox):

- Filiates (3)
- Igoumenitsa (1)
- Souli (2)

=== Prefecture ===
Thesprotia was established as a prefecture in 1937 (Greek: Νομός Θεσπρωτίας). As a part of the 2011 Kallikratis government reform, the regional unit Thesprotia was created out of the former prefecture Thesprotia. The prefecture had the same territory as the present regional unit. At the same time, the municipalities were reorganised, according to the table below.

New municipality	Old municipalities	Seat
Filiates	Filiates	Filiates
Filiates	Sagiada	Filiates
Igoumenitsa	Igoumenitsa	Igoumenitsa
Igoumenitsa	Margariti	Igoumenitsa
Igoumenitsa	Parapotamos	Igoumenitsa
Igoumenitsa	Perdika	Igoumenitsa
Igoumenitsa	Syvota	Igoumenitsa
Souli	Souli	Paramythia
Souli	Acherontas	Paramythia
Souli	Paramythia	Paramythia

=== Provinces ===
- Province of Thyamida – Igoumenitsa
- Province of Filiates – Filiates
- Province of Margariti – Margariti
- Province of Souli – Paramythia

Note: Provinces no longer hold any legal status in Greece.

== Economy ==
Thesprotia is traditionally one of the poorest and most remote regional units of Greece. The main economic activities are agriculture and tourism, with agriculture as historically the main economic activity.

The main tourist attractions of the region are its numerous beaches, particularly the resort of Syvota. Other tourist attractions are the remains of ancient cities.

=== Infrastructure ===
In 1996, construction began on the A2 motorway, officially called Egnatia Odos. The road, which links the Ionian coast at Igoumenitsa to Thessaloniki and further to Alexandroupoli and the Greek–Turkish borders, was opened to traffic in 2009. Other main roads in Thesprotia include: the EO6, from Igoumenitsa to Ioannina; the EO19, from Preveza to the border with Albania near Konispol; and the Igoumenitsa–Actium National Road, which runs along the Ionian Sea coast. There are also 12 numbered provincial roads, introduced in 1956 while Thesprotia was a prefecture.

In 2009, construction began for a new highway that will connect Igoumenitsa and Saranda, passing by Sagiada and Konispol.

The port of Igoumenitsa serves ferry routes to the islands of Corfu and Paxoi (includes Antipaxoi), as well as Italy.

== See also ==
- List of settlements in Thesprotia
- Ancient Thesprotia
- Thesprotians

== Sources ==
- Komatina, Predrag (2016). "ОБЛАСТ ВAГЕНИТИЈА И ЕПИСКОПИЈА СВ. КЛИМЕНТА" [The Region of Vagenitia and the Bishopric of St. Clement] (PDF). Zbornik radova Vizantološkog instituta (in Serbian). LIII (53): 83–100. doi:10.2298/ZRVI1653083K.
- Soustal, Peter; Koder, Johannes (1981). Tabula Imperii Byzantini, Band 3: Nikopolis und Kephallēnia (in German). Vienna: Verlag der Österreichischen Akademie der Wissenschaften. ISBN 978-3-7001-0399-8.
