= Cham Albanians =

Subgroup of Albanians

Total population
- c. 170,000–690,000

Regions with significant populations
- Albania: 120,000–250,000
- Greece: 44 Muslim Chams (1986), c. 40,000 Orthodox Chams
- Turkey: 80,000–100,000
- United States: 50,000–70,000

Languages
- Albanian (Cham Albanian dialect)

Religion
- Islam (majority); Orthodox Christianity (minority)

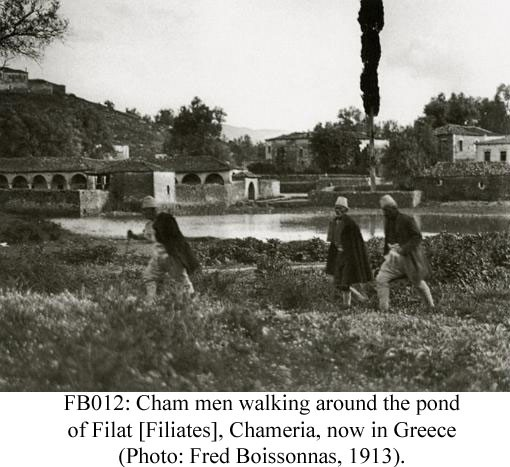
Cham men walking around the pond in Filati, 1913

Cham Albanians or Chams (also spelled Çam Albanians or Çams; Albanian: Çamët; Greek: Τσάμηδες, romanized: Tsámides) are a subgroup of Albanians who originate from Chameria, a region along the Ionian coast of northwestern Greece and southernmost Albania. The Chams have their own particular cultural identity within Albanian subgroups. A number of Chams contributed to the Albanian national identity and played an important role in starting the renaissance of the Albanian culture in the 19th century.

Chams speak their own dialect of the Albanian language—the Cham Albanian dialect—which is a Southern Tosk dialect and one of the two most conservative ones (the other being Arvanitika).

During the late 1930s, Chams suffered from intimidation and persecution under the dictatorship of General Metaxas. Following the Italian occupation of Albania in 1939, Chams became a prominent propaganda tool for the Italians and irredentist Albanians. As a result, on the eve of the Greco-Italian War, Greek authorities deported adult male Chams to internment camps. After the occupation of Greece, parts of the Muslim Cham population collaborated with Italian and German forces. This fueled resentment among the local Greek population and, in the aftermath of World War II, the entire Muslim Cham population was forcefully expelled to Albania.

Most Chams settled in Albania, while others formed émigré communities in Turkey and the United States, and today their descendants continue to live in these countries. Since the fall of Communism in Albania, Albanian Chams have campaigned for right of return to Greece, as well as for their right to restoration of confiscated properties. According to Laurie Hart, the remaining Orthodox Cham communities in Epirus are presently assimilated and entirely identify with the Greek nation. On the other hand, Janusz Bugajski includes the Orthodox among Cham Albanians. In Albania, the Cham dialect and other traditions have been preserved, while in Greece linguistic rights and Orthodox Cham heritage have been suppressed in public space and been subject to assimilation policies. As such, the use of Albanian has been relegated to private space within the household.

== Name ==
=== Etymology and definition ===
The word Cham, like that of the region Chameria, is generally traced to the Greek hydronym Thyamis (Greek: Θύαμις; Albanian: Kalamas), which is also the name of the river that runs through the ancient region of Epirus. According to this view, the term Cham entered Albanian through a now-extinct Slavic dialect spoken in Epirus during the Middle Ages. That dialect's form of the name is not attested in writing but has since been reconstructed as *čamь or *čama, from the older Slavic term, *tjama. The linguist Eqrem Çabej, however, argues that Cham descends directly from Thyamis, without any Slavic intermediary. A folk etymology attributes the term to the Turkish word cami (Greek: tzami) which literally means 'mosque-goer, mosque attendee' and presumably was the name used by Orthodox Christians for the descendants of Muslim converts. However, this is unlikely since the word's broader ethnographic and dialectal sense encompasses the entire Albanian-speaking population of the Thesprotia and Preveza regional units of Greek Epirus, both the Muslim and Christian populations.

Chams account for the greatest part of the erstwhile substantial Albanian minority in the wider area of the Epirus region; outside Chameria proper, there are only two Albanian-speaking villages further northeast (near Konitsa in Ioannina regional unit), whose inhabitants belong to a different Albanian subgroup, that of the Labs. Today, in the Greek context the use of the term has become largely associated with the former Muslim minority.

=== Ethnic appellations ===
Cham Albanians are known primarily by the Albanian form of the name Chams (Çam or Çamë) and the Greek name Tsamides (Τσάμηδες). It can be found in English sources also as a hybrid form of both names, Tsams. Prior to 1944, Greek sources often referred to Chams as Albanophones (Greek: Αλβανόφωνοι) or simply Albanians of Epirus.

In Greece, Muslim Chams were referred to by a number of names by different authors. They were called Albanochams (Αλβανοτσάμηδες, Alvanotsamides), and Turkalbanians (Τουρκαλβανοί, Tourkalvanoi) or Turkochams (Τουρκοτσάμηδες, Tourkotsamides). From the middle of the nineteenth century however, the term Turk and from the late nineteenth century onwards, derivative terms such as Turkalvanoi have been used as a pejorative term, phrase and or expression for Muslim Albanian populations by non-Muslim Balkan Peoples. Amongst the wider Greek-speaking population until the interwar period, the term Arvanitis was used to describe an Albanian speaker regardless of their religious affiliations. In Epirus today, Arvanites is still used to describe Albanian speakers, regardless of their citizenship or religion.

In Thesprotia, the Albanian speaking population, who are very rarely characterized as Christian Chams, may be referred to by Greeks as Arvanites. The local Greek population also calls them Graeco-Chams (Greek: Ελληνοτσάμηδες), while Muslim Albanians sometimes designate them as Kaur, which means "infidel" and refers to their religion. This term was used by Muslim Albanians for the non-Muslims during the Ottoman Empire.

The term shqiptar ("he/she who speaks clearly")—the Albanian ethnic endonym which came to prevail after the 18th century—was used by Christian Albanian-speakers in the region as well; presently, it is used mostly as a means to differentiate Chams from other groups in the region (i.e., Greeks, Vlachs, etc.). Greek-speakers use the term "skipetaros" (shqiptar) to refer pejoratively to Orthodox Albanian-speakers in Thesprotia.

Some Aromanians living the region also use a regional self appellation Tsamuréńi for themselves derived from the words Chameria and Cham.

Chams in Turkey are known by the name Arnauts (Arnavutlar), which applies to all ethnic Albanians in Turkey.

== Distribution ==
Cham communities now mostly exist in Albania, the United States and Turkey, as a result of their expulsion from their homeland, Chameria in Greece after World War II. A minority still lives in this region.

=== Chameria ===
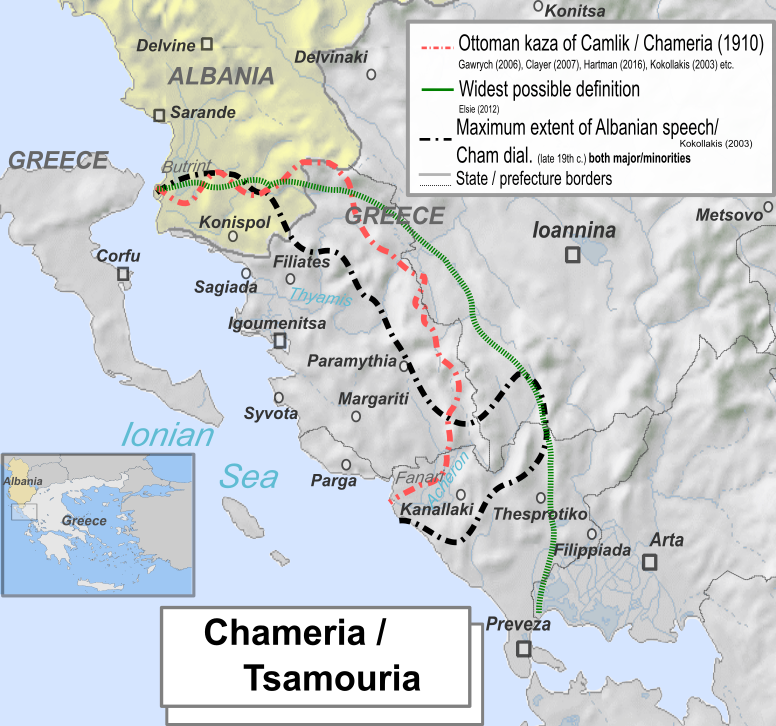
Chameria according to various views. Approximate geographical outline of Chameria according to R. Elsiein green.

Chameria is the name applied by the Albanians to the region formerly inhabited by the Chams, along the Ionian coast from Konispol to the north to the Acheron valley south. This area corresponds to a few villages in the southern part of the Saranda district in Albania (the municipalities of Konispol, Xarrë and Markat) and to the regional units of Thesprotia and Preveza in Greece. This area is part of the larger region of Epirus.

Much of the region is mountainous. Valley farmlands are located the central, southern and the western part of Thesprotia, while the terrain of the Preveza regional unit is mostly hilly. There are two rivers in the region: the Thyamis and Acheron.

The main settlements in which Chams originally resided were: Paramythia, Filiates, Igoumenitsa, Parapotamos, Syvota, Sagiada, Perdika, and Margariti. Preveza and Ioannina also had significant Cham Albanian communities. The Orthodox Chams originally resided in Fanari, Louros and Thesprotiko.

The Albanian speaking exclave of Chameria, in the beginning of the 20th century, was located along the Ionian coast, and apart from Konispol, its northernmost part, it included the western part of Thesprotia prefecture and the northern part of Preveza. In terms of modern Greek administration, the Albanian exclave included the provinces of Thyamis and Margariti and the westernmost villages of the provinces of Paramythia and Filiates. In Preveza prefecture, it included the northern regions such as the Fanari plain, the surroundings of Parga and villages of the upper Acheron valley, with two settlements of the latter region located in Ioannina prefecture.

=== Albania ===
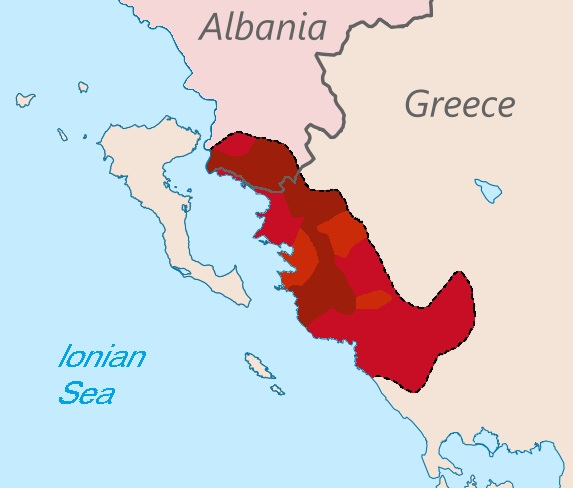
Maximum extent of Cham Albanian dialect: 19th century till 1912/1913 (Hatched line), according to Kokolakis.M. Population (irrespective of linguistic background) shown by religion: Muslim majority (Brown), Orthodox majority (Pink), Mixed (Light Brown). Colored areas do not imply that Albanian-speakers formed the majority of the population.

After the expulsion of the Muslim Chams from Greece, they were spread throughout Albania. The majority of Muslim Chams settled in the outskirts of Vlorë, Durrës and Tirana. Several hundred Chams moved into properties along the Himara coast and to existing villages along the coast such as Borshi, or established entirely new villages, such as Vrina, near the Greek border.

=== Diaspora ===
Some Chams live in Turkey and the United States. The number of Chams in diaspora was estimated by Miranda Vickers in 2007 at 400,000. The first wave of this diaspora left for Turkey during the Greco-Turkish population exchange of 1923. They have populated the areas of Erenköy and Kartal in Istanbul, as well as a number of towns in the area of Bursa, especially Mudanya. After the Second World War, others settled in İzmir, Gemlik and Aydın. After 1944, another part migrated to the United States of America, where they were mainly concentrated in Chicago, as well as Boston and New York City.

== History ==
Timeline of Cham history
Chronology	Events
1210	Albanians mentioned in Western sources, opposite Corfu.
1358	The Despotate of Arta is established by Peter Losha, an Albanian chieftain.
1380	John Zenevisi, forms the Principality of Gjirokastër, which incorporates the northern part of the Chameria region.
1414	The region falls under Ottoman and Venetian control.
16th century	The process of Islamization begins among the Albanians, but initially makes little headway.
1622	A group of Albanian origin, the Souliotes, form a confederation in the mountains of Souli, resisting Ottoman troops.
18th and 19th centuries	Widespread Islamization of the population occurs, and the majority of Albanians become Muslims by the late 19th century.
1792–1803	Ali Pasha, who had incorporated all of Epirus into his pashalik, declares war on the Souliotes. The Souliotes are able to resist for nine years, but are eventually defeated and evicted from Souli. The survivors of the population are evacuated to the Ionian islands.
1821–1829	The Greek War of Independence. Revolutionary General of the Greek Army, Markos Botsaris, was ordered by the provisional Greek government to convince the Muslim Chams to join the Greek cause but without success.
1827	The former bishop of Paramythia, Grigorios, translates the New Testament into Albanian, as his flock could not understand the 1st century Greek of the New Testament well.
1878	The Albanian National Awakening begins. A separatist Albanian movement, the League of Prizren, is established, and names Abedin Dino as leader of the local branch in Chameria.
1879	Father Stathi Melani opens the first Albanian-language school of the region in Sagiada.
1912–1913	The Balkan Wars. Epirus is annexed by Greece. Albania declares its independence from the Ottoman Empire, asking for sovereignty over the whole region of Epirus. Six Cham delegates from Chameria and Ioannina sign the declaration. The Treaty of London gives the majority of Chameria to the Kingdom of Greece, with only a few villages going to Albania.
1922	During the Greek-Turkish population exchange, a few thousands of Cham Albanians leave Chameria. 16,000 Greek refugees are settled in the region until 1926, when later they were moved on to other parts of Greece.
1926	Albanians are officially recognized as a minority, and are promised compensation for their land and Albanian-language schools.
1927	The new Greek government passes a law that deprives minorities, including Chams, from citizenship if they would leave Greece for some time, rescinding the earlier concessions.
1928	More than 100 village names are changed to Greek in the prefectures of Thesprotia, Preveza and Ioannina.
1935	Albania and Greece sign an agreement that would allow the creation of Albanian-language schools for the Chams. This agreement too was nullified as a dictatorial regime took power in Greece.
1936	The Greek state creates a new prefecture called Thesprotia, from parts of Ioannina and Preveza prefectures, as to exercise better control over the Cham Muslim minority.
1939	Following the Italian annexation of Albania in March, Albanian conscripts in the Greek Army are disarmed and put to construction work, while others are sent to internal exile in the Aegean Islands.
1940	Italy invades Greece, but is repelled. In April 1941, the German Army conquers Greece.
1941–1944	The Axis Occupation of Greece. The majority of the Muslim Cham elites actively collaborated with the occupation forces. A minor part joined the Resistance in both Albania and in Greece (from May 1944) at the end of the war without significant contribution.
1944–1945	Following the withdrawal of German forces, the majority of the Muslim Chams fled or were expelled into Albania by the forces of the right-wing National Republican Greek League.
1946	The Chams are organized as refugees in Albania, and petition unsuccessfully for return to their homeland.
1952	Greece confiscates Cham properties and nullifies their citizenship. The Communist government in Albania gives them compulsory Albanian citizenship.
1991	The National Political Association "Çamëria", a pressure group advocating the return of the Chams to Greece, is established.
1994	Albania passes a law declaring 27 June The Day of Greek Chauvinist Genocide Against the Albanians of Chameria.
1999	Albania and Greece agree to create a bilateral commission, focusing only about the property issue as a technical problem. It has not yet functioned.
2004	Chams create the Party for Justice and Integration to represent their interests in Albanian politics.
2011	Chams create the PDIU, as two Cham political parties were merged.

=== Medieval era (up to 1434) ===
The first undisputed mention of Albanians as an ethnic group in historical records dates from the second half of the 11th century, where they are named as the inhabitants of Arbanon in central Albania. During this time, the earliest mention of Albanians within the region of Epirus is recorded in a Venetian document of 1210 as inhabiting the area opposite the island of Corfu. Nevertheless, significant movements of Albanian populations in the region are not mentioned prior to 1337. Groups of Albanians moved into Thessaly and the Peloponnese as early as 1268 as mercenaries of Michael Doukas.

In the early 14th century, some Albanian clans were reported in Epirus and Thessaly, mainly hired as mercenaries from the Byzantines. A major migration occurred in the 1340s and 1350s when Albanian tribesmen supported the successful Serbian campaign against Byzantine possessions the region. During this migration period, two Albanian entities were formed in Epirus: the Despotate of Arta (1358–1416) and the Principality of Gjirokastër (1386–1411). While the area of Vagenetia (medieval name of Chameria/Thesprotia) was mainly under the control of Italian rulers: either Venetians or the Despotes of Epirus based in Ioannina. That time, representatives of Vagenetia, together with a delegation from Ioannina, asked the Serb ruler Simeon to protect them from the Albanian threat. Both Albanian entities were annexed and in 1419, many Albanians fled from Epirus and moved to Morea. Those tribes that settled in southern Greece would become the ancestors of the Arvanites.

=== Ottoman rule (1434–1913) ===
The region of Epirus was conquered by the Ottoman Empire in the early 15th century. Cham Albanians weren't the only Albanian-speaking population in the region even though they constituted a significant component of the Albanian-speaking population in the part of Epirus, which was incorporated in Greece after 1912. Besides Cham Albanians which lived in Thesprotia, Albanian-speaking communities lived in the northern part of Prefeza prefecture (the Fanari plan (Albanian: Frar and the hinterland of Parga) and the Parasouliotic villages Zermi, Krania, Papadates, Rousatsa as well as Derviziana and Mousiotitsa, which are part of Ioannina prefecture. There were also other Albanian groups which in the 19th century had become Greek-speaking as attested by primary accounts about them older than the 19th century and toponyms of Albanian origin in specific regions. These areas included the settlements along the Tyria river valley, the region to the northeast of Ioannina Lake, the region south of the Fanari plain in Preveza and partly the area extending to the south Tzoumerka mountain range.

From the establishment of Ottoman rule until 1864, the region of Chameria was included in the Eyalet of Rumelia. It was divided between the sanjaks of Delvina and Ioannina, which were second order administrative divisions. After 1864, this territory was organized under the Vilayet of Yanya (Ioannina), which was further divided into the sanjaks of Ioannina, Preveza and Gjirokastra. Between 1787 and 1822, Ali Pasha controlled the region, which was incorporated into his Pashalik of Yanina, a de facto independent state under only nominal Ottoman authority.

Under Ottoman rule, Islamization was widespread amongst Albanians. Until the end of the 16th century, Chams were still predominantly Christian, but by the end of the 17th century the urban centers had largely adopted Islam. The growth of an Albanian Muslim elite of Ottoman officials, like pashas and beys, such as the Köprülü family, who played an increasingly important role in Ottoman political and economic life, further strengthened this trend. In northern Chameria the vast majority became Muslims, while south of Acheron and down to Preveza, Albanians remained Orthodox. Muslim Chams were mostly followers of the Bektashi order, especially after the 18th century, when the Bektashis made considerable gains in influence in the rugged areas of southern Albania and neighbouring Greek Macedonia in northern Greece. The Chams have their own peculiar cultural identity, which is a mixture of Albanian and Greek influences as well as many specifically Cham elements. Although the Chams were primarily of Albanian origin, the Greek-speaking Muslims of Epirus also shared the same route of identity construction. Albanian Chams did not face any dilemma over their ethnic identity or relations with other Albanian socio-cultural and dialectal subdivisions. In general religion, and not ethnicity, defined each community in Ottoman society. Under this context the Muslim communities in Ottoman Epirus were classified as "Turks", while the Orthodox as "Greeks" regardless of their ethnic origin, though some exceptions existed.

The process of Islamization of the Chams started in the 16th century, but it reached major proportions only in the 18th and 19th centuries. According to the population census (defter) of 1538, the population of the region was almost entirely Orthodox, with only a minority, estimated less than five per cent, having converted to Islam. The main instigator for the beginning of mass conversions in the region were the draconian measures adopted by the Ottomans after the two failed revolts of the Greek monk Dionysius the Philosopher as well as a number of Muslim local farmers, against the Ottomans. In their wake, the Ottoman pashas tripled the taxes owed by the non-Muslim population, as they regarded the Orthodox element a continuous threat of future revolts. Another reason for conversion was the absence of liturgical ceremonies in Chameria, especially in the northern part of the region. According to the French historian Fernand Braudel, in the wider region of which today is Southern Albania and Northwestern Greece, "it lacked the church discipline; in the churches was not performed any religious ceremony, which meant that Christianity did not have deep roots there". This combination resulted in the first wave of conversions in the beginning of the 18th century, by a number of poor farmers. At this time Muslims became the majority in a few villages like Kotsika, near Sagiada. The wars of the eighteenth and early nineteenth centuries between Russia and the Ottoman Empire negatively impacted upon the region. Increased conversions followed, often forced, such as those of 25 villages in 1739 which are located in current day Thesprotia prefecture. During the entire 18th century, Muslims were still a minority among the Albanian population of the region, and became the majority only in the second half of the 19th century. Estimates based on the defter of 1875 show that Muslim Chams had surpassed Orthodox Chams in numbers.

In a number of cases however, only one person, usually the oldest male member of the family, converted into Islam, in order not to pay taxes, while all other members remained Christians. As a result, historians argue that the Cham Albanians were either Christian or Crypto-Christian as late as the first half of the 19th century. During the second half though the majority of Chams became fully islamized and Crypto-Christianity ceased to exist. As a result of the social structure of the Ottoman Empire, the Muslims of the region, the vast majority of whom were Albanians, being favored by the Ottoman authorities, were feuding with their Orthodox neighbors.

==== Albanian National Awakening (1870s–1912) ====
As Ottoman society was founded on the religion-based millet system and not on ethnic groups, schools in Chameria, as elsewhere where Albanians lived, were conducted only in Turkish and Greek. Christian Albanians could attend Greek schools, and Muslim Albanians Turkish schools, but Albanian language schools were highly discouraged. Nationalist sentiments during the late Ottoman era was weak in the region with Muslim Albanian Chams referring to themselves as Myslyman(Muslims) or Turks while local Orthodox Albanian speaking Christians referred to themselves as Kaur (i.e infidels) and did not find the term offensive. During the Albanian National Awakening a number of local Albanians would establish private, unrecognized Albanian-language schools. In 1870, the despot of Paramythia, Grygorios, translated the New Testament into Albanian, as his followers could not understand well the Greek language. While, in 1879, the first Albanian school of the region was created in Sagiada by father Stathi Melani. At that time, the region was under the short-lived rule of the League of Prizren.

Some Chams also played an important role in the National Renaissance of Albania (Rilindja Kombëtare). Several Chams were heads of cultural clubs and patriotic organizations, which aimed at the establishment of an independent Albanian state. Amongst them, the most distinguished personalities during the last years before independence were Abedin Dino, Osman Taka and Thoma Çami.

Abedin Dino was one of the founders of the League of Prizren (1878) and one of the main contributors in the Albanian independence. He was appointed as the chief representative of the League of Prizren for Chameria, and established a local League branch in Ioannina. When the League was disbanded in 1881, he continued fighting against Ottoman forces in Albania. He was killed by the Ottoman army while on his way to participate in the formation of the League of Peja.

Another leader of the Prizren League active at the same time was Osman Taka. When the League of Prizren was formed he was named as the head of the local branch in Preveza. When the Ottoman forces managed to seize the Preveza League in 1886, Osman Taka too was arrested, accused of treason, and sentenced to death. He was executed in Konispol in 1897.

Thoma Çami was one of the main contributors to the revival of Albanian culture during this period. He was a founder and the first chairman of the organization "Bashkimi", the best-known cultural club of the National Renaissance. He also wrote the first scholarly history book for Albanian schools, but died before the declaration of independence.

Albanian intervention occurred when after the Congress of Berlin in 1878, parts of Chameria, were to be ceded by the Ottoman Empire to the Kingdom of Greece. Even before negotiations started, the Ottoman side used a number of Albanian national figures for delaying purposes and appointed Abedin bey Dino, as Ottoman foreign minister. Moreover, Abedin Dino managed to gather various Albanian personalities in Preveza, from all over Albania and Epirus, who believed that the Ottomans will provide full support to the Albanian movement and were against annexation of Epirus to Greece. They also organized a meeting there in January 1879 and on 28 February 1879, signed a petition with a threat to take arms to prevent an annexation of Preveza to Greece. As a result of the unrest created, led by Abdyl Frashëri, another Albanian national figure, the local Ottoman governor was recalled. Abedin Dino was also recalled from Preveza, while the recently arrived Albanians left the city and returned to their homelands.

In January 1907 a secret agreement was signed between Ismail Kemal, a prominent leader of the then Albanian national movement, and the Greek government which concerned the possibility of an alliance against the Ottoman Empire. According to this, the two sides agreed that the future Greek-Albanian boundary should be located on the Acroceraunian mountains, thus leaving Chameria to Greece. As part of the agreement, Kemal in exchange asked the Greek authorities to support the Albanian movement and the Greek side agreed, provided that no armed Albanian activity will emerge south of the Acroceraunians. Kemal's reasons for closer ties with Greece during this time was to thwart Bulgarian ambitions in the wider Balkans region and gain support for Albanian independence.

When the Ottoman defeat was imminent and before the arrival of the Greek army in the region, Muslim Cham and Lab armed units burned a number of Greek villages: 3 in the vicinity of Preveza (Tsouka, Glyky, Potamia), 4 in Thesprotia (Alpohori, Manoliasa, Keramitsa, Fortopia) as well as a number of villages in the regions of Ioannina, Sarande and Delvina. From these actions, many villagers managed to escape to the nearby island of Corfu. The local Orthodox Albanian speaking population did not share the national ideas of their Muslim Albanian speaking neighbours, whereas instead they remained Greek-oriented and identified themselves as Greeks.

Throughout this period the Albanian speaking zones in Thesprotia and adjacent areas that later became part of Albania was considered a nuisance for both the Greek state and Christians of Epirus who self identified as Greeks. The non-Greek linguistic factor posed a hindrance to Greek territorial ambitions. Tackling this issue was undertaken through two policies. The first was that Greek historians and politicians attempted through concerted efforts to conceal the existence of the Albanian language within the region. The second was to present the argument that the language spoken by the local population had no relation upon their national affiliations. According to the prevalent ideology in Greece at the time, every Orthodox Christian was considered Greek, whereas after 1913, especially the area of Southern Albania deemed "Northern Epirus" by Greece, Muslims were considered Albanians. With the incorporation of the area within Greece, these discursive policies alongside the practical were continued. This was due to the sizable Albanian Muslim population being considered a real problem for the Greek state and hence any pro-Albanian movement eventuating had to be eliminated by all means.

Chams had their own delegates in the Vlora Congress of 1912, when Albanian Independence was proclaimed. Four representatives from Chameria and two representatives of Ioannina took part in the congress, and the six of them were in favor of Independence. They were Jakup Veseli from Margariti, Kristo Meksi and Aristidh Ruci from Ioannina, Rexhep Demi from Filiates, Veli Gërra from Igoumenitsa, and Azis Tahir Ajdonati from Paramythia. The Muslim Cham communities in the regions of Paramythia, Margariti and Preveza, according to information gathered by the Greek foreign ministry during 1908 to 1911, were supporters of the Ottoman administration and shared an Ottoman national identity, while still being sympathizers of the Albanian national movement to a certain degree. Especially in the Sanjak of Preveza, Muslim Albanians embraced ideas regarding the Albanian national movement of the time. Amongst them large landowners and state employees who came from other places were hostile to the local Greek population and persecuted them. Also though unknown in numbers, the proportion of Muslim Albanians over a prolonged period increased within this area, due to official Ottoman resettlement policy regarding geo-strategic interests and concerns.

=== Modern history ===
==== Balkan Wars, World War I and first years of Greek rule (1913–1923) ====
With the onset of the Balkan Wars (1912–1913), Muslim Chams were uneager to fight as part of the Ottoman army. Nonetheless, most of the Lab and Cham beys formed irregular armed groups that fought against the Greek units, burning a number of villages in the regions of Paramythia, Fanari and Filiates. On the other hand some beys in Margariti were not willing to fight and were ready to accept Greek rule due to the general anarchy in the Ottoman Empire. Local Christians were enlisted as part of the Greek forces. Within a few days after the Greek army secured control of the region, a Greek Cretan paramilitary under commanders Deligiannakis and Spiros Fotis, killed 75 Cham notables of Paramythia who were gathered to pledge allegiance to the Greek state. Occurrences of atrocities perpetrated by Greek forces within the region were recorded mainly by the Albanian side, whereas those events were noted only indirectly, though clearly by Greek government officials. A few months later, more Cham notables were murdered by Greek authorities. In their internal correspondence, Italian diplomats in the region noted that this was a tactic employed to end Cham Albanian influence in the region by eliminating the elite class which had the role of dissemination of Albanian national ideology in the broader population.

Following the defeat of Ottoman forces in the Balkan Wars of 1912–1913, an international boundary commission awarded the northern part of the region of Epirus to the Principality of Albania, and the southern part to the Kingdom of Greece, leaving Greek and Albanian minority areas on both sides of the border. Most of the areas inhabited by Chams, except for a few villages, were assigned to Greece. After the end of the Balkan Wars, Greek authorities suspected that a local anti-Greek movement was possible, supported by the Provisional Government of Albania and Italy, and decided to disarm the population. Moreover, Albanian representatives accused Greece of assassinations and persecution of Cham representatives. These accusations were rejected by the Greek government. In the December 1915 legislative elections, due to the general boycott declared by the party of Eleftherios Venizelos, two of the three deputies of Preveza electoral periphery were Muslim Chams: Ali Dino and Musli Emin Ramiz. Persecution of Chams continued during World War I at a smaller scale than in the Balkan Wars. Many villages mainly in the former kazas of Filiates and Paramythia were burnt down.

After the final incorporation of southern Epirus into Greece, Chams had the right to choose between Greek and Turkish nationality, under the 4th provision of the Athens peace treaty. It can be inferred that during the Interwar period the Muslim Cham community did not appear to have a clear-cut understanding of their national affiliation beyond their local religious affiliations. Chams were in fact divided amongst themselves as to where their loyalties lay. In the event, the Chams chose the Greek nationality instead of the Turkish. This convention gave special rights to religious minorities, but not to ethnic minorities, under the third provision. In accordance with the Greek policy on minorities at the time, Orthodox Cham Albanians were counted together with Greeks, while the Muslim Chams were counted in the census as a religious minority. Although the Albanian government complained that Chams were discriminated against by the Greek authorities, there is little evidence of direct state persecution at this time.

During this period, the Muslim Cham beys lost the political power they enjoyed during Ottoman rule, but manage to briefly retain their economic influence. The Muslim portion of the population was under a sui generis rule of the Greek authorities and the local muftis, who were recognized in these areas. In the region of Epirus there were the muftis of Ioannina, Paramythia, Filiates, Margariti, Igoumenitsa, Parga, Preveza, Sagiada and Thesprotiko. Soon with the outbreak of WWI, Greek authorities imposed significant restrictions on land rights of Cham Albanian property owners. Additionally, a new tax system which targeted large estates of Muslim landowners was employed and massive grain expropriation was used again Cham properties to support Greek war effort. This led to starvation and dozen of deaths in the region. A military report of the Italian general commissioner to the Italian Ministry of Defence notes that from July 1917 onward the rule of the Greek authorities in Epirus had forced more than 3,000 Chams to seek refuge towards Istanbul and Anatolia.

==== Population exchange and appropriation of property (1923–1926) ====
Chams in Filiates in 1915, by Fred Boissonas

At the conclusion of the Greco-Turkish War (1919–1922), Greece and Turkey signed the Treaty of Lausanne, according to which the Muslims of Greece would be exchanged with the Orthodox Christians of Turkey, making a unique exception for the Muslims of western Thrace and the Orthodox Christian population of Istanbul. The treaty used religion as the indicator of national affiliation, thus including Muslim Cham Albanians in the population exchange.

Greek officials had two options. The first was to exchange Muslim Chams with Greeks from Turkey, under the population exchange. The second option was to exchange them with a community of the Greek minority in Albania. They approached the Albanian government in 1923, but Albanian officials refused to consider the second scheme. In January 1923, the Greek representative of the population exchange committee regarding the Muslim Chams declared officially that Greece "has no intention to proceed to an exchange of Muslims of Albanian origin".

Muslim Chams nevertheless were to become part of the Greek-Turkish population exchange, yet the Albanian state asked for an exemption. The majority of the Muslim Cham community had no idea of their ethnic origin or preferences beyond that of their local religious affiliations and considered themselves simply Muslims. Though by the time of the population exchange, the Muslim Cham population had been nationalized and constituted a "de facto Albanian national minority". As such, Greek officials viewed the Muslim Chams as a population that were hostile to Greece’s national interest of security and territory. In doing so, the Greek state insisted on the Muslim Chams migration to Turkey by both handing down ultimatums and utilizing harassment tactics that were undertaken by local paramilitary groups to pursue that aim.

In May 1924 however, a delegation of the League of Nations visited the area to investigate the issue of exchangeability. The delegation met groups of Albanian Cham Muslims from various villages in the area that had been chosen by Greek authorities and local muftis. The local muftis were supportive of the Greek administration. Later, the delegation concluded that the vast majority of the Cham community declared that they were of Turkish origin and wished to be included in the exchange. One year later, a second commission in general confirmed the conclusions of the first one.

After pressure by Italian and Albanian delegates which made a case that the Chams primarily self-identified as Albanian nationals, Greece accepted in 1925, two years after the exchange had officially begun, that Muslim Chams were not subject to the exchange. The Greek minister in London, Kaklamanos, promised that "the compulsory exchange shall not be applicable to the Moslem [sic] subjects of Albanian origin". But Muslim Chams had to prove their ethnic origin in order to remain in Greece. According to the Greek decision, which was presented by Eleftherios Venizelos to the local administration in Epirus, only those who were born in Albania or whose fathers were born in Albania could stay in Greece, thus excluding the genuine Chams of the Chameria region. On the other hand the Albanian state insisted that the Chams were forced to leave Greece because the Greek authorities were making life "unbearable" for them.

In the meantime, the Greek authorities did send a number of Cham Albanians to Turkey. According to the contemporary Greek political historian Athanasios Pallis, only 1,700 were exempted and the League of Nations estimated that 2,993 Muslim Chams were forced to leave for Turkey, even after their compulsory exchange was prohibited, by declaring themselves as Turks rather than Albanians. In Turkey, Cham Albanians were accommodated in Istanbul and Bursa. The majority of them were from Ioannina and outlying areas and Preveza. About 16,000 Greek refugees from Asia Minor were settled in Epirus, mainly in the same areas.

The members of the Muslim Cham community owned vast tracts of land without the accompanying title-deeds. Under the Treaty of Lausanne some of this land was appropriated, on financial terms agreed to with the owners, to meet the needs of the landless refugees from Anatolia and Thrace who were settled in Epirus. This measure was applied across the board and there were no exceptions: as well as the Chams, Greek landowners and monasteries were also required to give up some of their property. The Chams, however, sought compensation not as Greek citizens, but under the terms providing compensation for certain West European nationals whose property had been appropriated. Both Greece and the League of Nations rejected the demand.

Four different laws were passed between 1923 and 1937 that expropriated the properties of Muslim Chams, while leaving those of local Orthodox Albanian speakers and Greeks intact. Official Greek policy was that properties belonging to either Muslim citizens in Greece, who were exempt from the exchange of populations, or to foreign citizens, be preferentially expropriated. Albanian reports to the League of Nations and the reply by the Greek government reveal that part of the dispute concerned changes to the status of local Albanian landlords. During the Ottoman era, revenues were received by Albanian landlords from nearby villages. After these lands became part of the Greek state, local peasants expropriated from Albanian landlords what they considered was their property and refused to pay such taxes. While the majority of the Muslim Cham population consisted of middle sized land owners with land that varied in fertility, production and size. There were other Muslim Chams though who were more limited financially and in land.

The first law was passed on 15 February 1923, expropriating the lands and second homes of Muslim Chams, in order to give it to Greek refugees and to landless Greek farmers. Compensation was set at below 1914 market price, and not 1923 values. On the other hand, the compensation for the homes would be given by 1923 value. Nevertheless, some Chams were never compensated. As a result of this policy, a number of petitions were addressed to the Ministry of Agriculture or to the officials of the Refugee Settlement Commission from Muslims of Albanian origin in Paramythia, Dragoumi, Filiates, and other parts of the region, but no answer was given. This law was reported even to the League of Nations, but in June 1928 the Albanian petition against Greece was turned down. The Albanian government responded to these events with accusations of discrimination during 1925–1928. While the Greek side stated that the same expropriation policy was implemented nationwide for all Greek citizens.

However, during the period of 1922–1926, the Greek government used the settling of Greek refugees as a tool for applying pressure on Muslim Chams to leave Greece. These refugees in accordance with Greek law of the time took advantage of land expropriations and settled in the houses of Cham Muslims, which made some sell their land and become landless. There were also government restrictions on the right to lease, sell or cultivate land due to Muslim Chams being classified as "exchangeable" which led to the gradual financial devastation of the Muslim Cham population. Due to the fluidity of the situation, there were some Muslim Chams who sold their properties to the incoming refugees with a view of proceeding with a migration to Turkey, due to the exchange, while the League of Nations sought to be informed of those developments. As such, in 1925 the Greek government by means of a special operation was still trying to persuade Muslim Chams to leave the country. It was only by 1926, when the Muslim Chams were decided by the Greek government not to be exchanged that most of these refugees were resettled to other parts of Greece. Thereafter, only a limited number of Asia Minor Greek refugees remained in the region and were resettled throughout settlements within the provinces of Filiates, Margariti and Paramythia. After 1926, with the relocation of the refugees to other parts of Greece, the Greek government took careful discretion in Greek Epirus to implement its land reform and expropriations toward the Muslim Cham population so as to prevent discrimination occurring against them regarding the matter. In 1928, the Albanians took their concerns regarding property ownership, expropriations and restitution, issues over minimal socio-political representation and military recruitment. The League of Nations in its findings relegated the matter of property restitution or (re)-compensation of expropriated lands to bilateral negotiations. The League of Nations also stipulated that it would not deal with other raised Albanian concerns, as they had been subject to past reports and discussions. In sum, the League of Nations decision regarding the Greek position relating to the Muslim Chams was considered a clear vindication.

Reginald Leeper, the British ambassador at Athens in 1945, in a letter to the British Foreign Secretary Anthony Eden in April 1945 mention that the Greeks can blame Cham Albanians for the murder of the Italian General Enrico Tellini which was the pretext for the Italian bombardment and occupation of Corfu at 1923.

==== Pangalos regime (1926) ====
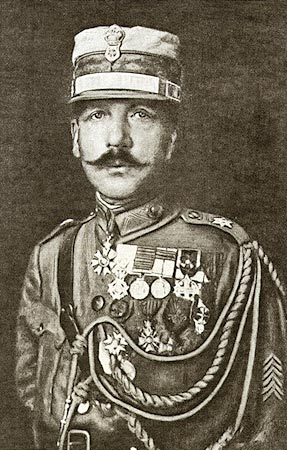
Theodoros Pangalos

An unexpected turn in Chams' fate occurred when an Arvanite general, known for his pro-Albanian feelings, became prime minister of Greece. On 24 June 1925, a group of officers, fearing that the political instability was putting the country at risk, overthrew the government in a coup and their leader, Theodoros Pangalos became the head of the dictatorial government. His main priorities in foreign relations were to establish good relations with Albania and to protect the rights of both minorities, Chams in Greece, and Greeks in Albania. For this reason he officially decided that the Albanians of Chameria would not be sent to Turkey after 1926, putting an end to the population exchange. He also decided that refugees from Asia Minor would not settle in Chameria, but rather in Western Thrace, as was originally decided.

Pangalos was an Albanian-speaker, and declared himself proud of his half-Albanian identity. His priority in establishing good relations with Albania was soon materialized by four agreements between the two governments, among others addressing the confiscation of Cham properties before 1926, when Greek refugees from Asia Minor were settled in the region. This agreement stated that Chams would be compensated at least as much as foreign citizens or ethnic Greeks. In a public statement he also recognized that Chams were an ethnic minority and promised that Albanian schools would be opened in the region. But after a few months he was overthrown, and his pro-Cham policies were immediately abolished.

==== Discrimination and normalization (1927–1936) ====
In August 1926, Theodoros Pangalos was deposed by a counter-coup, and Pavlos Kountouriotis was restored as President of Greece. Pangalos' actions had encouraged Albania to be more persistent in pursuing Cham claims. Pangalos' overthrow also meant a backtracking of Greece's official stance on the issue of Cham rights; as a result, discrimination against Chams persisted.

On the first elections in 1926, Cham Albanians created their own political party, called the Party of the Chameria founded by an eminent figure of that time, the famous Prevezan cartoonist Ali Dino. It managed to gain 1,539 votes from the Preveza and Ioannina prefectures. In the subsequent elections, the party did not gain the support of the local Albanian population and Ali Dino ran under Farmer-Labor ticket, gaining only 67 votes in 1932.

In 1927, the Greek government abolished four of the nine Vakoufs, the muftis of Parga, Preveza, Sagiada and Thesprotiko. Furthermore, beginning in 1927 with the publication of the relevant Presidential Decree, the Greek government implemented a policy depriving Muslim Chams and other minorities of their Greek citizenship if they would leave Greece. According to the 1927 decree, Greek citizens of non-ethnic Greek origin ("allogeneis") could lose their citizenship if they left the country. Such a practice is seen by scholars as a legal exclusion of Chams and other minorities from Greek society, since it made a distinction based on national affiliation, which was effectively set as a criterion above citizenship in Greek legal order.

In 1929, the League of Nations asked Greece to open Albanian-language schools, since they had been officially recognized as an Albanian minority. The official position however of the then Greek prime minister, Eleftherios Venizelos, was that since the region had never had Albanian schools, even under the Ottoman Empire, this issue could not be compared with the rights demanded by the Greek minority in Albania.

Nevertheless, following pressure from the League of Nations and as a result of the agreements signed during Pangalos' regime, Greece officially announced the establishment of four bilingual primary schools in Filiates, Igoumenitsa, Paramythia and Sagiada. All these schools would be Greek, but Albanian would also be taught in the three first classes. An Albanian delegation led by the Albanian ambassador, Mid'hat Bey Frashëri, asked the Greek government for 15 schools, with full teaching in Albanian, in the main towns and villages of Chameria, a request that was immediately rejected by Greek officials. After negotiations, the Albanian government accepted the Greek proposal and an agreement was signed in 1935 that would allow the Greeks of Albania to open new private schools in Himara and Korca, in exchange for the four bilingual schools in Chameria. But once again, the change of the Greek government with the coup d'état of Ioannis Metaxas made this agreement void.

At this time, the Greek government tried to resolve another core issue pertaining to the Cham Albanians, the property dispute. In 1928, the Venizelos government had withdrawn from the Greco-Albanian agreement, signed by Pangalos that would compensate Chams equally with other Greek citizens. Muslim Chams tried to regain their properties under the Law of 1926, which gave them the opportunity to dispute the confiscation of their properties before the courts. Following these actions, Greece passed two laws, in 1930 and 1931, which gave bigger compensations to the Muslim community, but not as much as to other Greek citizens. The first law doubled the promised compensation, and forced the state authorities to give 3/4 of the promised compensation, even if they appealed the decisions in the courts. The second law returned some of the lands that were not settled by Greeks to Cham Albanians. Both laws were implemented on a limited scale, because of the change of the Greek government and the establishment of the dictatorial Metaxas Regime. At that time, members of the Cham community suffered from discrimination due to severe expropriations of their lands.

During this period, a number of villages were renamed in the region. More than 100 village names were changed in Thesprotia, Preveza and Ioannina. Many other names had already been changed in 1913 when the region came under Greek sovereignty. Villages like Shëndiela in Preveza were translated into Greek Agia Kyriaki (Saint Kyriake), while other toponyms such as Ajdonati or Margëlliç had been immediately renamed with new Greek names (Paramythia and Margariti). The majority of villages and towns of the region got new names, mainly Greek ones, in 1928 and 1929. Another period of Hellenization of toponyms occurred in the 1950s, when the remaining Albanian or Turkish names were finally renamed into Greek, with very few exceptions. Today, only a small number of Albanian toponyms, like Semeriza (from Albanian Shemërizë, meaning Saint Mary), survive from Ottoman times.

In September 1930, the proposal for exchange of the Cham minority with the Greek minority of Albania was renewed, this time by the Albanian government. King Zog of Albania attempted to reach an agreement with the Greek government on the resolution of all differences between the two countries. The Albanian government believed that a voluntary population exchange of the two minorities would resolve a number of internal problems for both sides and improve Greek-Albanian relations. However, this proposal was rejected by the Greek side, who feared that Albania would forcibly evict its Greek minority from the country, making the exchange involuntary.

The Venizelos government (1928–1932), despite the former Greek-Albanian crisis, took measures to intensify the improvement of the Cham communities both on economic and social basis. In 1931 a law was passed that allowed direct payment of reimbursement through the granting of analogous bonds and the direct return of improperly expropriated urban properties. A number of Cham families responded to these favorable regulations. Moreover, the Albanian government accepted the Greek proposal for the payment of indemnifications in bonds, allowing that way the promulgation of the relevant legislation and thus enabling the process of paying indemnification to the Albanian citizens. Thus, in 1935, according to Greek diplomatic reports, most of the Albanian demands that concerned the Cham communities appeared to be settled. In April 1930, the League of Nations heard claims by small property Muslim Cham landowners that illegal expropriations occurred within the region, while Greek authorities stated that the region had been exempted from those land reform laws. In June 1930, the Greek government passed a special law that properties within Thesprotia were exempt from the Agrarian land laws which satisfied the League of Nations regarding the matter. During this time though, there were ongoing efforts by Greek authorities to prompt the dislocation of the Muslim Cham population by means of hard-line policies and migration to Turkey, while discouraging or even forbidding it to Albania. The Muslim Chams by the 1930s were viewed in Greece as a hostile population and unable to be integrated within the socio-political structures of the state.

==== Repression under the Metaxas regime (1936–1940) ====
The harshest period of discrimination against Cham Albanians occurred during the dictatorial regime of Ioannis Metaxas, Prime Minister of Greece from 1936 to 1941. The nationalistic character of his regime was imposed on all minorities in Greece. As with Slavic-speakers, Aromanians and Roma, Albanian-speaking minorities were prohibited from using their own language outside home. Those who used Albanian words in school or in the army, were punished physically or humiliated. The Greek language was imposed in the schools and elders who had no knowledge of the language were forced to attend night-schools, in order to learn to read, write and even speak the Greek language. Meanwhile, either due to the absence of Greek or for reasons of demographic importance, Greek education was expanded with the establishment of kindergartens in some Orthodox Albanian speaking villages.

In 1936, the Greek state created a new prefecture called Thesprotia, from parts of Ioannina and Preveza prefectures, as to exercise better control over the Cham Muslim minority. The colonization of the area with Greeks and the confiscation of Cham property increased and Albanian place names were replaced with Greek ones. In villages where both Muslim Chams and Christians lived, Muslim heads of the local administration were replaced with Christian ones. During the same period harassment by the local police towards Chams became more and more frequent.

=== Second World War and expulsion ===
==== Greek-Italian War (1940–1941) ====
At the same time, a negative influence about the position of Cham Albanians came from Albania. Following the Italian invasion of Albania, the Albanian Kingdom had become a protectorate of the Kingdom of Italy. The Italians, especially governor Francesco Jacomoni, used the Cham issue as a means to rally Albanian support. Although in the event, Albanian enthusiasm for the "liberation of Chameria" was muted, Jacomoni sent repeated over-optimistic reports to Rome on Albanian support.

In June 1940 a Muslim Cham by the name of Daut Hoxha was found headless in the village of Vrina in Southern Albania. Daut Hoxha was a notorious bandit killed in a fight over some sheep with two sheperds. Hoxha's death was used as the final excuse from fascist Italy in order to attack Greece. Italian propaganda officially described him as "an Albanian from Chameria animated by great patriotic spirit" murdered by Greek spies inside Albania, declaring the imminent liberation of Chameria. As the possibility of an Italian attack on Greece drew nearer, Jacomoni began arming Albanian irregular bands to use against Greece.

At the beginning of World War II, when Greece announced its full mobilisation prior to the Italian invasion, Cham Albanians requested to be included in said mobilisation; in response, Greece included them in the mobilisation but had them work in construction rather than give them arms, which alienated the Albanians. Cham Albanian community leaders were arrested and forced into exile by Greek authorities on the same day that Italy invaded Greece, giving the community indubitable proof that the Greek state held a negative perception towards the Chams and leaving their community without leadership, which probably influenced their behaviour towards the Greeks in the following months. When the Greek army reoccupied the area during the early stages of the Italian invasion, they exiled nearly the entire male population - specifically all males older than 14 - to camps on the islands of Lesbos, Chios and Corinth, which left the Cham Albanian women, children and elderly defenseless and unguarded, resulting in murders, rapes and robberies. The Greek forces turned a blind eye to the atrocities committed by local Greeks against Chams.

On the eve of the Greco-Italian War, Greek authorities disarmed 1800 Cham conscripts and put them to work on local roads. The Greco-Italian War started with the Italian military forces launching an invasion of Greece from Albanian territory. As Chams were used as a propaganda theme by Italians, the invasion force of Italy in Epirus was called "Ciamuria [sic] Army Corps". Part of the Chams supported the Italy's attack on Greece. The invasion force included native Albanians, estimated at 2,000–3,500 strong, (among them Chams and Kosovars), in three volunteer battalions attached to the Italian army. Their performance however was distinctly lackluster, as most Albanians, poorly motivated, either deserted or defected. Indeed, the Italian commanders, including Mussolini, would later use the Albanians as scapegoats for the Italian failure. During 28 October – 14 November while the Italian army made a short advance and briefly took brief control of part of Thesprotia, bands of Cham Albanians raided several villages and burned a number of towns, including Paramythia and Filiates.

In November, as the Greek counter-offensive managed to regain Thesprotia, the Greek authorities seized all Muslim Cham males not called up or with the Italians, and deported them to island exile for security reasons. Until the invasion of Greece by the German army, the Muslim Cham population of the region of Chameria was composed of women, children and the elderly. The adult male Muslim Chams would be restored to their land only after fascist Italy gained control of the region. In 1941, Greece was occupied by German, Italian and Bulgarian armies, who divided the country in three distinct occupation zones.

==== Occupied Greece and collaboration with the Axis (1941–1944) ====
===== Italian occupation =====
Prior to the outbreak of World War II, 28 villages in the region were inhabited exclusively by Muslim Chams, and an additional 20 villages had mixed Greek-Cham populations. Germany was against the annexation of the region to Albania that time. Nevertheless, Fascist Italian as well as Nazi German propaganda promised that the region would be part of Great Albania after the end of the war. After the defeat of Greece, the establishment of the Italian occupation authorities in Epirus was completed up until middle May 1941 and the following month the first armed units consisting of Cham Albanians were active in the region. As a result of this pro-Albanian approach, large parts of the Muslim Cham population actively supported the Axis operations and committed a number of atrocities against the local population in Greece and Albania. Apart from the formation of an Axis collaborationist local administration and armed battalions, a paramilitary organization named Këshilla and a paramilitary group called Balli Kombëtar Çam were operating in the region, manned by local Muslim Chams. The results were devastating: many Greek, but even some Muslim Albanian and Orthodox Albanian speakers (Arvanites) lost their lives and a great number of villages were burned and destroyed. Assassinations of Greek officials, Albanian community leaders and other notables from both communities followed that perpetuated a cycle of revenge and retribution that worsened communal relations.

==== German occupation ====
From 29 July-31 August 1943, a combined German and Cham force launched an anti-partisan sweep operation codenamed Augustus. During the subsequent operations, 600 Greek and 50 Albanian citizens were killed and 70 villages were destroyed. On 27 September, combined Nazi-Cham forces launched large scale operation in burning and destroying villages north of Paramythia: Eleftherochori, Seliani, Semelika, Aghios Nikolaos, killing 50 Greek villagers in the process. In this operation the Cham contingent numbered 150 men, and, according to German Major Stöckert, "performed very well". In another incident, on 27 September, Cham militias arrested 53 Greek citizens in Paramythia and executed 49 of them two days later. This action was orchestrated by the brothers Nuri and Mazar Dino (an officer of the Cham militia) in order to get rid of the town's Greek representatives and intellectuals. According to German reports, Cham militias were also part of the firing squad. On 30 September, the Swiss representative of the International Red Cross, Hans-Jakob Bickel, while visiting the area, concluded that Cham bands are completely out of control, terryfing and committing atrocities against the unarmed Greek population.

After the capitulation of Fascist Italy, in September 1943, the local British mission proposed an alliance to the Chams and to fight together the Germans, but this proposal was rejected. Collaborationist Cham bands were also active in southern Albania. German General and local commander Hubert Lanz decided to initiate armed operations with the code name Horridoh in the region of Konispol, in Albania. Albanian nationalist groups participated in these operations, among them a Cham battalion of c. 1,000 men under the leadership of Nuri Dino. The death toll from these operations, which began on 1 January 1944 in the region of Konispol, was 500 people within Albania. Whereas, it appears that, most of the local beys, the majority of whom were part of the nationalist resistance group Balli Kombëtar (not to be confused with the collaborationist Balli Kombëtar Çam) and the mufti did not support such actions.

==== First expulsion ====
During the summer of 1944, the head of the local resistance organization, Napoleon Zervas, asked the Cham Albanians to join EDES in its fight against the left-wing ELAS, but their response was negative. After that and in accordance to orders given specifically to EDES by the Allied forces to push them out of the area, fierce fighting occurred between the two sides. According to British reports, the Cham collaborationist bands managed to flee to Albania with all of their equipment, together with half million stolen cattle as well as 3,000 horses, leaving only the elderly members of the community behind. On 18 June 1944, EDES forces with Allied support launched an attack on Paramythia. After short-term conflict against a combined Cham-German garrison, the town was finally under Allied command. Soon after, violent reprisals were carried out against the town's Muslim community, which was considered responsible for the massacre of September 1943.

Moreover, two attacks took place in July and August with the participation of EDES Tenth Division and the local Greek peasants, eager to gain revenge for the burning of their own homes. According to Cham claims, which are not confirmed by British reports, the most infamous massacre of Albanian Muslims by Greek irregulars occurred on 27 June 1944 in the district of Paramithia, when this forces captured the town, killing approximately 600 Muslim Chams, men women and children, many having been raped and tortured before death. British officers described it as "a most disgraceful affair involving an orgy of revenge with the local guerrillas looting and wantonly destroying everything". British Foreign Office reported that "The bishop of Paramythia joined in the searching of houses for booty and came out of one house to find his already heavily laden mule had been meanwhile stripped by some andartes".

On the other hand Chris Woodhouse, the head of the Allied Military Mission in Greece during the Axis occupation, who was present in the area at the time, officially accepted the full responsibility of the decision for the expulsion of the Chams although he criticized the vendetta way in which this was carried out; including in his "Note on the Chams" military report of 16 October 1945 a brief description of the situation that led to the Paramythia events: "Chams are racially part Turk, part Albanian, part Greek. In 1941-3 they collaborated with Italians, making the organization of guerilla resistance in that area difficult. I never heard of any of them taking part in any resistance against enemy. Zervas encouraged by the Allied Mission under myself, chased them out of their homes in 1944 in order to facilitate operations against the enemy. They mostly took refuge in Albania, where they were not popular either. Their eviction from Greece was bloodily carried out, owing to the usual vendetta spirit, which was fed by many brutalities committed by the Chams in league with the Italians. Zervas' work was completed by an inexcusable massacre of Chams in Philliates in March 1945, carried out by remnants of Zervas' dissolved forces under Zotos. The Chams deserved what they got, but Zervas' methods were pretty bad – or rather, his subordinate officers got out of hand. The result has been in effect a shift of populations, removing an unwanted minority from Greek soil. Perhaps it would be best to leave things at that."(PRO/FO,371/48094). During this time, small numbers of Muslim Roma from Filiates also fled to Albania alongside the Muslim Chams. They settled in village of Shkallë, near Sarandë, where due to immigration in recent years, some have resettled in Greece.

==== Resistance, Greek Civil War, repatriation by ELAS and final expulsion ====
As the end of World War II drew near, a small number of Muslim Chams became part of the Greek People's Liberation Army (ELAS), as well as the anti-fascist National Liberation Army of Albania. In the ELAS, a mixed Cham Albanian-Greek battalion named IV "Ali Demi" battalion was formed, named after a Cham Albanian who was killed in Vlora fighting against the Germans. At the time of its creation in 1944, it consisted of 460 men, some of whom were Chams. However, the majority of the elites of the Cham community had become corrupted by the occupying forces and the atmosphere against the local Greeks who had suffered under Germans, Italians and Chams, led to an explosive polarization which would have constrained any motivation for joint Greek-Cham resistance.

Although there is no evidence of contribution against the Axis, Cham units in the ELAS participated in the first phase of the Greek Civil War fighting against the EDES. Having limited support in Epirus due to the right-wing EDES dominance in the area and in preparation of taking up the country's control after the German withdrawal from Greece, turned to the Chams for conscription. Seeing the omens several hundred Muslim Chams enlisted in its ranks. Local ELAS forces with the participation of those Chams volunteers, aided with ELAS forces from the central Greece, attacked EDES in Epirus and succeeded to take the control in the Thesprotia region in late 1944. As a result of this short-term ELAS victory, in January–February 1945, about four to five thousand Chams returned to their homes from Albania, mainly in the border areas of Filiates and Sagiada. But after the final defeat of ELAS during the battle of Athens and its capitulation (see Varkiza Agreement), EDES veterans and local communities were eager to take revenge for the Cham's participation. Led by an EDES veteran, Col. Zotos, a loose paramilitary grouping of former EDES guerrillas and local men went on a rampage. In this second massacre, committed at the town of Filiates, on 13 March, some sixty to seventy Chams were killed. Many of the Cham villages were burned and the remaining inhabitants fled across the border into Albania.

The exact number of Cham Albanians that were expelled in Albania and Turkey, is unknown. Mark Mazower and Victor Roudometof, state that they were about 18,000. while Miranda Vickers says that they were 25,000 that fled into Albania. Chameria Association claims that Cham Albanians that left were 35,000, from whom, 28,000 left to Albania and the rest to Turkey. After the war, only 117 Muslim Cham Albanians were left in Greece. Violence by the EDES groups was much more limited compared to incidents perpetrated against German populations that time throughout Europe, in particular by the advancing Soviet Army. EDES managed to secure control of the region after the initial conflicts.

=== Postwar situation (1945–1990) ===
Muslim Chams who fled to Albania were given refugee status by the communist-led Albanian government and were organized under the aegis of the Anti-Fascist Committee of Cham Immigrants (CAFC). The Albanian state gave them homes in specific areas in the south of the country, so as to dilute the local Greek element in the region (known as Northern Epirus to Greeks).

In 1946, they formed a congress, where they adopted a memorandum accusing Greece for their persecution, and asked the international community to react in order to return to their homeland and to receive reparations. The CAFC claimed that 28,000 Chams were evicted, 2,771 killed and 5,800 houses were looted and burned.

The new post-war Communist government of Albania took the Cham issue to the Paris Peace Conference, demanding the repatriation of the Chams and the return of their property. The following month a delegation of the CAFC was sent to Athens to lodge a protest with the government of George Papandreou. These demands were never answered. The United Nations Assembly in New York did however acknowledge the humanitarian crisis facing the refugees, and gave US$ 1.2 million via the United Nations Relief and Rehabilitation Administration (UNRRA), specifically for refugees from northern Greece. Meanwhile, in 1945–1946, a Greek Special Court on Collaborators found 2,109 Chams guilty of treason in absentia and sentenced them to death, while their immovable property was confiscated by the Greek state. No war criminal of Cham origin has ever been brought to trial, however, as these had all managed to flee Greece in the aftermath World War II.

For those Albanian speaking communities in Thepsrotia who remained in Greece after 1945, their Albanian identity was discouraged as part of a policy of assimilation. The abandoned Cham villages were repopulated by adjacent Greek and Aromanian-speaking communities.

In 1953, the Albanian government gave all Chams the Albanian citizenship and forced them to integrate into Albanian society. Despite this, many older Chams still regard themselves as refugees deprived of their Greek citizenship and claim the right to return to their property in Greece.

==== Under the People's Republic of Albania ====
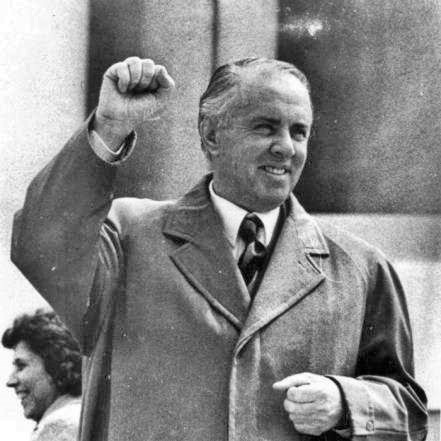
During Enver Hoxha's regime, the Cham Albanians were believed to be of questionable loyalty and could easily become agents of a foreign power.

During the People's Republic of Albania (1944–1985) the country was governed by Enver Halil Hoxha. The 40-year period of Hoxha's regime was characterized by the use of Stalinist methods to destroy associates who threatened his power. The regime was increasingly conspicuous towards the Cham community. It believed that they were of questionable loyalty and could easily become agents of a foreign power. This view was probably based because they were Greek citizens and their elites were traditionally rich landlords, while collaboration with the Axis and anti-communism were also significant factors that contributed to this. At the end of 1945, numerous Cham Albanians were imprisoned by the authorities of the People's Republic of Albania, while they were branded as "war criminals", "collaborators of the occupation forces" and "murderers of the Greeks". Although the representatives of the community protested against these developments, this resulted in further arrests and exiles of Cham Albanians. Thus, the communist regime in Albania took a very distrustful view of the Cham community. Many of them were transferred further north, away from the southern border region.

In 1949, during the Greek Civil War (1946–1949), the leadership of the People's Republic of Albania tried to mobilize the Cham community in order to fight with the communists. After their negative response they were labelled "reactionaries" and suffered a certain degree of persecution within Albania. Moreover, the Cham issue was neglected by the local regime. In 1947 the regime revealed a conspiracy in which 85 Chams were allegedly part in the creation of an armed nationalist group named "Balli Kombëtar". In 1960 another anti-communist conspiracy was uncovered under Teme Sejko, a Cham admiral of the Albanian navy from Konispol. The alleged perpetrators, among them also 29 Chams, were accused as agents of "American, Yugoslav and Greek separatists". As a result, Sejko was executed and several of his relatives persecuted, while other members of the Cham community were imprisoned.

== Current situation ==
=== Politics in post-communist Albania ===
Following the fall of the Communist regime, the Chameria Political Association was formed in Tirana in 1991. Since its creation, its goal is the collection and recording of personal testimonies and accounts from Chams who left Greece in 1944–45 and are now living in Albania – personal archives, documents and other data – in a bid to preserve the historical memories that the older generation carry with them.

Annual Cham Protest on 27 June 2008 in Konispol, Albania

In 1994, Albania passed a law that declared 27 June, the anniversary of the Paramythia massacre of 1944, as the Day of Greek Chauvinist Genocide Against the Albanians of Chameria and built a memorial at the town of Konispol. This decision has not received any international recognition. A number of Cham Albanian supporters pay tribute to the victims every 27 June in Saranda and Konispol. This event is called the "Cham march" (Marshimi çam). In 2006, the biggest Cham March, with around 10,000 people participating, occurred at the Albanian-Greek border. The participants designated themselves as Greek citizens of Albanian ethnicity and expressed the desire for "a peaceful return to their homeland and to the graves of their forefathers"

In March 2004, the Institute of Cham Studies (ICS) was established with a board of 7 members. According to Miranda Vickers, the Institute’s primary aim is to attempt to "fill the huge gap in knowledge about the entire Cham issue". In the same year, the Chams also created their own political party, the Party for Justice and Integration (PJI), in order to campaign in the forthcoming parliamentary elections.

In 2005, a diplomatic incident occurred when the President of Greece, Karolos Papoulias canceled his planned meeting with Albanian counterpart, Alfred Moisiu, in Saranda, because 200 Chams were demonstrating about the Cham issue. The Greek Ministry of Foreign Affairs stated that the Albanian authorities did not take adequate measures in order to protect the Greek President "by deterring known extremist elements, who are trying to hinder the smooth development of Greek-Albanian relations". The Albanian president's office stated that President Moisiu expressed "deep sorrow at this unexplainable decision, which was based upon misinformation, of the small, peaceful and well monitored demonstration".

Recently, a few Chams have managed to find their way back to their families' old homes, and have tried to rebuild them. At the same time, several hundred ethnic Greek minority families from Albania have settled in towns such as Filiates.

=== In Greece ===
==== Muslims ====
The Greek census of 1951 counted a total of 127 Muslim Albanian Chams in Epirus. In more recent years (1986) 44 members of this community are found in Thesprotia, located in the settlements of Sybota, Kodra and Polyneri (previously Koutsi). Moreover, until recently the Muslim community in Polyneri was the only one in Epirus to have an imam. The village mosque was the last within the area before being blown up by a local Christian in 1972. The number of Muslim Chams remaining in the area after World War II included also people who converted to Orthodoxy and were assimilated into the local population in order to preserve their properties and themselves.

==== Christian Orthodox ====
According to a study by the Euromosaic project of the European Union, Albanian speaking communities live along the border with Albania in Thesprotia prefecture, the northern part of the Preveza prefecture in the region called Thesprotiko, and a few villages in Ioannina regional unit. In northern Preveza prefecture, those communities also include the region of Fanari, in villages such as Ammoudia and Agia. In 1978, some of the older inhabitants in these communities were Albanian monolinguals.

According to Hart, today these Orthodox Albanian speaking communities refer to themselves as Arvanites in the Greek language and self-identify as Greeks, like the Arvanite communities in southern Greece. On the other hand, Bugajski includes the Orthodox among Cham Albanians. They refer to their language in Greek as Arvanitika and when conversing in Albanian as Shqip. In contrast with the Arvanites, some have retained a distinct linguistic and ethnic identity, but also an Albanian national identity. In the presence of foreigners there is a stronger reluctance amongst Orthodox Albanian speakers to speak Albanian, compared to the Arvanites in other parts of Greece. A reluctance has been also noticed for those who still see themselves as Chams to declare themselves as such. Tom Winnifrith on short stays in the area (early 1990s) found it difficult to find Albanian speakers in urban areas and concluded in later years that Albanian is not longer spoken at all in the region. Amongst some Orthodox Albanian-speakers of the area, like the residents of Kastri village near Igoumentisa, there has been a revival in folklore, in particular in the performance of "Arvanitic wedding".

=== In Turkey ===
Muslim Chams in Turkey form the second largest community of Chams, after Albania. This community was established after the two World Wars. After the First World War, Chams were forced to leave for Turkey during the population exchange, and another migration wave followed after the Second World War, when a minority of the Chams expelled from Greece chose Turkey over Albania because of their anti-communist sentiments. From 1913 to 1944, about 85,000 Albanians, most of whom were Chams, emigrated to Turkey.

The exact number of Muslim Chams in Turkey is unknown, but various estimates conclude that they number between 80,000 and 100,000, from a total population of 500,000 to 6 million of full or partial Albanian descent that live in Turkey. The Chameria Human Rights Association declares that most of them have been linguistically assimilated, although they maintain Albanian consciousness and regional Cham traditions. A considerable number of Chams in Turkey have changed their surnames to Cam or Cami, which in Turkish means pine, in order to preserve their origin. They are organized within the "Albanian-Turkish Brotherhood Association" (Albanian: Shoqëria e Vllazërisë Shqiptaro-Turke, Turkish: Türk-Arnavut Kardeşliği Derneği), which fights for the rights of Albanians.

=== In the United States ===
Chams in the United States are the fourth most numerous population of Chams, after Albania, Turkey and Greece. The majority of this community migrated to the United States shortly after their expulsion from Greece, because the Communist government in Albania discriminated and persecuted them. They managed to retain their traditions and language, and created the Cham League in 1973, Chameria Human Rights Association (see below), which later merged and became Albanian American Organization Chameria which aimed to protect their rights.

== Cham issue ==
=== Political positions ===
Albania demands the repatriation of the Muslim Chams who were expelled at the end of World War II, and the granting of minority rights. The Chams also demand the restoration of their properties, and reject a financial compensation. Greece on the other hand states that the expulsion of the Chams is a closed chapter in the relations between the two countries. However, Greece agreed to the creation of a bilateral commission, focused solely on the property issue as a technical problem. The commission was formally set up in 1999, but has not yet functioned.

During the 1990s, Albanian diplomacy used the Cham issue as counter-issue against the one related with the Greek minority in Albania. Chams complain that Albania has not raised the Cham issue as much as it should. It was raised officially only during a visit to Athens of former Albanian Prime Minister Ilir Meta at the end of 1999, during his meeting with his Greek counterpart, Kostas Simitis, but it received a negative response. After 2000, there was a growing feeling in Albania, since the Kosovo problem has been to an extent addressed, that the Albanian government should turn its attention to the Cham issue. On the other hand, that Greece is a member of the European Union and NATO, which Albania wishes to join, is one of the main factors why the Albanian government is reticent about the issue.

The Greek government on the other hand considers the Cham issue as a closed chapter. According to the Greek official position, the Chams would not be allowed to return to Greece because they have collaborated with the Italian-German invaders during the Second World War, and as such they are war criminals and are punished according to Greek laws. In an attempt to give a solution, in 1992 Prime Minister Konstantinos Mitsotakis proposed a trade-off in relation to their properties, only for the cases where their owners had certifiably not been convicted or participated in crimes against their fellow Greek citizens. Mitsotakis also proposed that the Albanian government likewise compensate ethnic Greeks who had lost properties due to alleged persecution during the communist regime in Albania. This proposal however was rejected by the Albanian side.

The Cham issue has been linked with the issue of the War Law, in the context of World War II and especially the war between Greece and Albania. Their exodus is connected with similar World War II events following the defeat of the Axis: such as the exodus of the German populations of Gdańsk, Pomerania, Silesia East Prussia and Sudetenland. The case of the properties who are under sequestration, taking into account that the stance of war against Albania was revoked by the Greek government in 1987, is seen by some Greek law experts and the Albanian government as in force and thus preventing restitution or expropriation as they are interpreted as "enemy property". Under the Greek law it is not certain if the case of the Cham properties can be classified as such. Nevertheless the restitution of these properties can be legally blocked due to activity against the state, which appears to be according to Greek law experts a significant factor in this case. The confiscated properties of those who collaborated with the Axis cannot raise any legal issue. The same appears to be the case of the abandoned properties which were expropriated in the 1950s.

The "Cham Issue" has not been a part of the agenda for international organizations. Since 1991, delegates of the Cham community have begun an attempt to internationalize the "Cham Issue", but the only official support for this issue has come from Turkey. Meanwhile, in 2006, Members of the Party of Justice and Integration met European MEPs, including the chairwoman of Southwest Europe Committee on the European Parliament, Doris Pack and introduced their concerns about the Cham Issue. Although this group of MEPs drafted a resolution about this issue, it was never put to a vote.

In September 2016 the Enlargement Commissioner of the European Union Johannes Hahn mentioned the Cham issue as an "existing one" between Albania and Greece, alongside other matters that the two countries needed to resolve.

=== Citizenship issue ===
Following their expulsion in 1944, initially only the 2,000 or so Chams who were sentenced to death as collaborators were deprived of their Greek citizenship. The remainder, who represented the vast majority, lost theirs under a special law of 1947. Orthodox Albanian speakers within the region remained in Greece and retained the Greek citizenship, but without any minority rights. In 1953 the Albanian government forcefully granted the Albanian citizenship to the Chams, while in Turkey and the United States, the Chams have acquired the respective citizenships.

The Chams demand the restoration of the Greek citizenship as a first step towards solving the Cham issue. The restoration of the citizenship, rather that the regaining of the confiscated properties, is reported to be considered as the primary issue. They argue that the removal of their citizenship was a collective punishment, when even the Greek courts have charged a minority of Chams for alleged crimes. They have demanded dual citizenship, a policy followed by Greece in the case of the Greek minority in Albania.

=== Property issue ===
After World War II, the properties of Cham Albanians were put under escrow by the Greek state. In 1953, the Greek parliament passed a law, that considered as "abandoned" the rural immovable properties, whose owner had left Greece without permission or passport. After three years the properties were nationalized. Homes were nationalized in 1959, when a law passed by the Greek parliament considered them abandoned and allowed their conquest by other inhabitants of the region. These two laws nationalized Chams properties, and allowed others to settle in their homes, but the owner was the Greek state. In the 1960s and 1970s an ad hoc commission for the property alienation in Thesprotia gave by draw the rural properties to farmers with and without land, while homes and urban properties in Igoumenitsa, Paramithia, Margariti, Filiates, Perdika and Sybota were given to homeless people.

=== Minority rights ===
The Chams are not a recognized minority by both global and peripheral international organizations, such as the United Nations and the OSCE. The decisions of the Cham representatives in general do not have any legal dimension or commitment in international politics.

Cham organizations ask for their repatriation and a recognition of their rights as a minority. They have also asked for minority rights for the Orthodox Albanian speakers residing in Greece. This position is supported even by politicians in Albania. In January 2000, the former Prime Minister of Albania, Sali Berisha, then head of the opposition, demanded more rights for the Cham minority in Greece, including the provision of Albanian-language schooling in Filiates.

=== Incidents ===
The Cham issue has become a dispute in both countries, and several diplomatic incidents have occurred. It had been also used by the Albanian organizations of liberation armies (Kosovo and National Liberation Army), in order to fuel the irredentist dreams of the descendants of the Chams. Moreover, there is a reported paramilitary formation in the northern Greek region of Epirus, called the Liberation Army of Chameria As of 2001, the Greek police reported that the group consisted of approximately 30–40 Albanians. It does not have the official support of the Albanian government.

== Organizations ==
Chams have created a number of organizations, such as political parties, non-governmental associations and the Chameria Institute.

=== Chameria Association in Albania ===
The National Political Association "Çamëria" (Albanian: Shoqëria Politike Atdhetare "Çamëria") is an advocacy group that calls for the right of return of the Chams to Greece, receipt of compensation for past wrongdoing, and the provision of greater freedoms for the Orthodox Albanian speakers in Greece. The group was founded on 10 January 1991. This associations holds a number of activities every year, with the help of the Party for Justice and Integration, as well as other organizations. Annually on 27 June, the Cham March is organized in Konispol. This march is held to remember the expulsion of the Chams. One particularly disingenuous endeavor by the organization leaders has been to create unhistorical links in the public mind by presenting the ancient Greek King Pyrrhus of Epirus (4th–3rd century BC) as an Albanian hero, thus revealing the extreme and irredentist aims of the association.

=== Chameria Human Rights Association ===
The Chameria Human Rights Association (Albanian: Shoqëria për të drejtat e Njeriut, Çamëria) is a non-governmental organization, based in Washington, DC, United States, which lobbies for the rights of Chams.

The group describes its mission as fourfold: to secure the right of return of the Chams "to their homes in Greece and live there in peace and prosperity with their Greek brothers"; to restore and protect Cham property rights; to ensure that the Chams are afforded "all other legal and minority rights deriving from the Greek Constitution and Laws, the Treaties and laws of the European Union, and other rights originating from international treaties and conventions to which Greece is a party"; and to conserve and promote Cham history, culture, and language.

=== Democratic Foundation of Chameria ===
The Democratic Foundation of Chameria (Albanian: Fondacioni Demokratik Çamëria) was founded in 2006 and aims to resolve the Cham issue, internationalizing the question in peaceful ways. It is based in The Hague, Netherlands. Every year it organizes protests outside the International Court of Justice, where it intends to bring the Cham issue, if the governments of both countries will not find a solution.

The organization aims to resolve the Cham issue in three directions: "lawfully and peacefully drawing attention to the legal position, the living and working conditions of the inhabitants and former inhabitants of Chameria; entering into negotiations with all types of organisations, both governmental and non-governmental; safeguarding the legal interest of inhabitants and former inhabitants of Chameria by means of legal proceedings, when necessary."

=== Party for Justice and Unity ===
The Party for Justice and Unity is a parliamentary party in Albania which aims to protect and uphold the rights of ethnic minorities inside and outside Albania, especially concerning with the Cham issue. The party was created after the 2009 parliamentary elections, in September from two deputies of the new Albanian parliament: the sole representative of Party for Justice and Integration, Dashamir Tahiri and Shpëtim Idrizi, a Cham MP of the Socialist Party. Currently it has 2 MPs in the Albanian parliament, which makes it the fourth biggest party in Albania.

=== Party for Justice and Integration ===
The Party for Justice and Integration (Partia për Drejtësi dhe Integrim), which represents the Chams in politics was formed in Albania in 2004. The party declares in its statute that it belongs to the center right, which is the political homeland for the vast majority of Chams marginalized by the Communist regime. Since the demise of the one-party state, the Chams have consistently put their faith in the center right parties to pursue their rights with Greece. However, the Chams are fully aware that Tirana’s politicians, whether Democrats or Socialists, only really focus on the Cham question during election time.

The party won the plurality of seats in the municipality of Saranda, Delvina, Konispol, Markat, Xarrë and was one of the main parties in big municipalities like Vlora, Fier, etc, on the last municipal elections in 2007.

=== Chameria Institute ===
In March 2004, the Institute of Cham Studies (Instituti i Studimeve Çame), also known as Chameria Institute or Institute of Studies on the Cham issue, was established with a board of 7 members. The Institute’s primary aim is to attempt to "fill the huge gap in knowledge about the entire Cham issue". One of the first actions taken by the board of the ICS was to hold the first ever Cham Conference in Tirana in May 2004.

Its declares as its mission, "to make researches [sic] in the history and culture fields of the cham community as an inherent and important part of the Albanian nation." Also it seeks "to evolve and stimulate public scientific debate and to accomplish studies", "to organize scientific activities and publishes their outputs." Institute of Cham Studies seeks "to create a wide contacts network with analog research centers in Albania and abroad (Balkan, Europe and Northern America) and participating in mutual activities."

=== Cultural Association "Bilal Xhaferri" ===
In 1993, a group of journalists and writers of Cham origin, founded in Tirana the Cultural Association "Bilal Xhaferri" (Shoqata Kulturore "Bilal Xhaferri"), nicknamed also as "the Cultural Community of Chameria" (Komuniteti Kulturor i Çamërisë). The association is a non-profit organization which aims to keep and promote the values of Cham Albanian culture and tradition. The association has established a publishing house, which publishes books especially about Chams and Chameria. It is named after the well-known dissident writer, Bilal Xhaferri and since its creation has published in Albania, Kosovo and the Republic of Macedonia, his hand-written memoirs and stories which were incomplete due to Xhaferri's premature death.

== Demographics ==
According to Miranda Vickers, the Chams number approximately 690,000. According to Cham organizations, the descendants of the "original Chams" number 170,000. Many of them live in Albania, while other communities live in Greece, Turkey and the USA. Their religions are Islam and Orthodox Christianity.

=== Historical demographics ===
The population of the region of Chameria was mainly Albanian and Greek, with smaller minorities. In the early 19th century, Greek scholar and secretary of the local Ottoman Albanian ruler Ali Pasha, Athanasios Psalidas, stated that Chameria was inhabited by both Greeks and Albanians. The later were divided between Christians and Muslims, while Greeks were the dominant element of Chameria. There was a dispute regarding the size of the Albanian population of the region, while in the 20th century some believe the term Cham applies only to Muslims. According to a contemporary Armenian American estimate from The New Armenia in 1912, there was a global total of 1,500,000 Tosk Albanians, of which 200,000 were Chams. According to 1913 Greek census, in Chameria region were living 25,000 Muslims whose mother tongue was Albanian, in a total population of about 60,000, while in 1923 there were 20,319 Muslim Chams. In Greek census of 1928, there were 17,008 Muslims who had as mother tongue the Albanian language. During the interwar period, the numbers of Albanian speakers in official Greek censuses varied and fluctuated, due to political motives and manipulation.

An estimation by Italian occupational forces during World War II (1941) included also Orthodox communities of Albanian ethnicity. According to this in the region lived 54,000 Albanians, of whom were 26,000 Orthodox and 28,000 Muslim and 20,000 Greeks. After the war, according to Greek censuses where ethno-linguistic groups were counted, Muslim Chams were 113 in 1947 and 127 in 1951. In the same Greek census of 1951, 7,357 Orthodox Albanian-speakers were counted within the whole of Epirus.

Chams in Greece (1913–1951)
Year	Muslim Chams	Orthodox Chams	Total population	Source
1913	25,000	–	Unknown	Greek census
1923	20,319	–	Unknown	Greek census
1925	25,000	22,000	47,000	Albanian government
1928	17,008	–	Unknown	Greek census
1938	17,311	–	Unknown	Greek government
1940	21,000–22,000	–	Unknown	Estimation on Greek census
1941	28,000	26,000	Unknown	Italian estimation (by Axis occupational forces during World War Two)
1947	113	–	Unknown	Greek census
1951	127	–	Unknown	Greek census. 7,357 Orthodox Albanian-speakers were also counted within the whole of Epirus.

=== Current demographics ===
In 1985, the Albanian population of Epirus, including Chameria and two villages in Konitsa was estimated 30,000. In 2002, according to author Miranda Vickers, in Chameria, the Orthodox Albanian population was estimated at 40,000. However, some scholars claim the term Cham in the 20th century applied only to Muslims, while both the Orthodox Albanian (Arvanitika) speaking and bilingual (Greek-Albanian) communities of the region identify with the Greek state and are part of the Greek nation. In the region today resides a small number post-1991 Albanian immigrants.

Albanian is still spoken by a minority of inhabitants in Igoumenitsa. According to Ethnologue, Albanian language is spoken by about 10,000 Albanians in Epirus and the village of Lechovo, in Florina.

The only exact number of Chams in Albania comes from 1991, when Chameria Association held a census, in which were registered about 205,000 Chams.

Chams in Albania by town (1991)
Place	Number
Shkodër County	1,150
Krujë District and Kurbin District	720
Tirana District	29,700
Lezhë District	35
Durrës District	35,000
Kavajë District	10,500
Vlorë District	42,300
Fier District	39,800
Sarandë District	12,100
Delvinë District	2,900

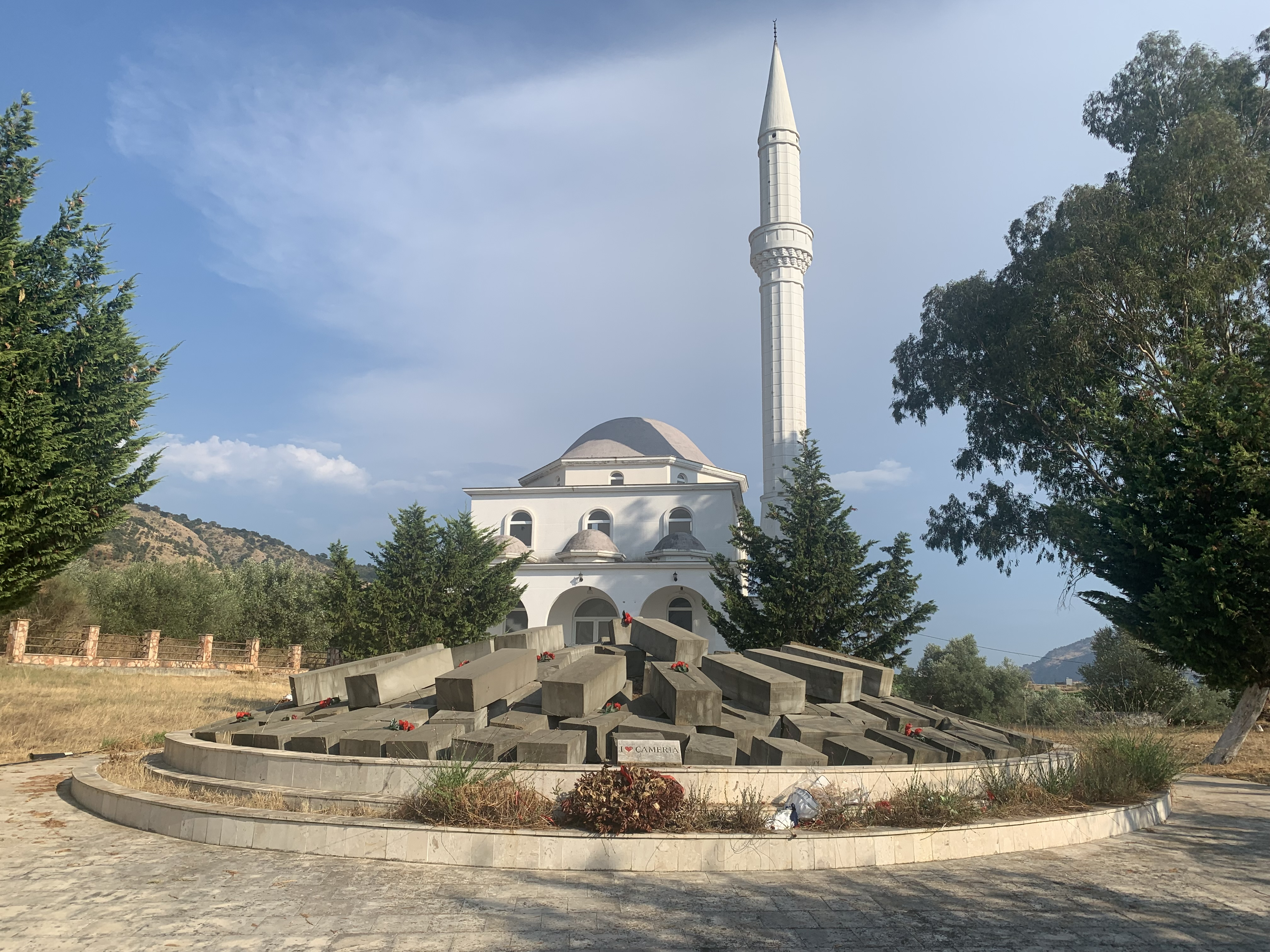
The "Trendafilat e Çamërise" Monumental Cemetery in Kllogjër, Konispol, dedicated to the expulsion of Cham Albanians during 1944–1945.

=== Religion ===
Chams living today in Albania are overwhelmingly Muslim, but it is difficult to estimate their current religious affiliation: the former Communist regime had proclaimed the country "the only atheistic state in the world", and even after its fall, the majority of the population self-declared agnostic, or irreligious. Current estimates conclude that this applies to a majority of Albanians, with 65–70 per cent of the population not adhering to any religion. Conversely, in Greece and Turkey almost all of Chams adhere to their country's respective prevailing religion.

== Language ==
Classification of Cham dialect

Cham Albanians speak the Cham dialect (Çamërisht), which is a sub-branch of the Tosk Albanian dialect. The Cham dialect is one of the southernmost dialects of the Albanian language, the other one in Greece being the Arvanitic dialect of southern Greece, which is also a form of Tosk Albanian. As such, Arvanitika and Cham dialect retain a number of common features.

Albanian linguists say that this dialect is of great interest for the dialectological study and the ethno-linguistic analysis of the Albanian language. Like Arvanitika and the Arbëresh varieties of Italy, the dialect retains some old features of the Albanian, such as the old consonant clusters /kl/, /ɡl/, which in standard Albanian are q and gj, and /l/ instead of /j/.

Cham Albanian	Standard (Tosk) Albanian	Arvanitika	English
Kljumësht	Qumësht	Kljumsht	Milk
Gluhë	Gjuhë	Gljuhë	Language
Gola	Goja	Gljoja	Mouth

Linguists say that these features give the Cham dialect a conservative character, which is due to the close proximity and its continuous contacts with the Greek language. They argue that this conservative character, which is reflected in a number of peculiar features of the dialect, is endangered, as are the Albanian toponyms of the region, which are no longer in use, and which have provided valuable material for research into the historical evolution of Albanian.

== Literature and media ==
=== Literature ===
Page from the dictionary of Markos Botsaris

The first Albanian-language book written in the region of Chameria was the Greek-Albanian dictionary by Markos Botsaris, a Souliote captain and prominent figure of the Greek War of Independence. This dictionary was the biggest Cham Albanian dictionary of its time, with 1,484 lexemes. According to albanologist Robert Elsie, it is not of any particular literary significance, but is important for our knowledge of the now extinct Suliot-Albanian dialect, a sub-branch of the Cham dialect. The dictionary is preserved at the Bibliothèque Nationale in Paris.

During the 19th century, Chams started creating bejtes, which were a new kind of poems, mainly in Southern Albania. The most well-known bejtexhi was Muhamet Kyçyku (Çami), born in Konispol. He is the only poet in Albania that has written in the Cham dialect and was apparently also the first Albanian author to have written longer poetry. The work for which he is best remembered is a romantic tale in verse form known as Erveheja (Ervehe), originally entitled Ravda ("Garden"), written about 1820. Kyçyku is the first poet of the Albanian National Renaissance.

In the modern period, the best-known Albanian writer is Bilal Xhaferri, who is considered as the most influential dissident under the Communist regime. He was born in Ninat, but was forced to migrate in the United States at an early age because of his anticommunism. He lived and died in Chicago, at 51 years of age, but he contributed to Albanian literature with more than 12 books of novels and poems. Canadian albanologist Robert Elsie considers him "the best Cham Albanian writer and poet."

=== Media ===
The Chams' culture and politics are represented by three local media in Albania and the United States. Due to the harsh Communist regime in Albania, Chams did not manage to publish any media in the 1945–1990 period. On the other hand, Cham emigrants in the United States established a newspaper and a magazine, both edited by Bilal Xhaferri, and headquartered in Chicago. The first Cham Albanian newspaper was published in 1966, named "Chameria – motherland". (Çamëria – Vatra amtare), and is still being published in Chicago, while the magazine "Eagle's wing" (Krahu i shqiponjës) started publishing in 1974.

The newspaper "Chameria - motherland" is mainly political, and tries to internationalize the Cham issue. In 1991 it became the official newspaper of the National Political Association "Çamëria", and since 2004 it is also the official newspaper of Party for Justice and Integration. The newspaper is published in Albania by a joint editorial board of the organization and the party, while in the United States it is published by Chameria Human Rights Association.

On the other hand, the magazine "Eagle's wind" is primarily a cultural magazine and is no longer published in the US since 1982. The Cultural Organization "Bilal Xhaferri" republished the magazine in Tirana, and since 1994 it is self-described as a monthly "cultural Cham magazine".

== Traditions ==
=== Music ===
Cham Albanians' music has its own features, which makes it differ from that of other Albanian music. Cham Albanian folk music can be divided into three main categories: the iso-polyphonic, the polyphonic and the folk ballads.

According to German scholar Doris Stockman, Cham music "may give an impact to further explain the inner Albanian relationships, among the vocal practices of the various folk groups in South Balkan, more than it had been done that far, as well as to offer new material to comparative studies concerning the complex of problems of the folk polyphony in Europe".

Iso-polyphony is a form of traditional Albanian polyphonic music. This specific type of Albanian folk music is proclaimed by UNESCO as a "Masterpiece of the Oral and Intangible Heritage of Humanity". Chams sing a different type, called the cham iso-polyphony. Although they border with Lab Albanians, their iso-polyphony is influenced more by the Tosk type. The song of Çelo Mezani, a polyphonic folk song narrating and lamenting the death of Cham Albanian revolutionary Çelo Mezani is considered to be the best-known Cham Albanian song.

=== Dances ===
Cham Albanian dances are well-known in Albania. The best-known is the Dance of Osman Taka. This Dance is linked with Osman Taka, a Cham Albanian leader who fought against Ottoman forces, and who managed to escape from death by amazing Ottoman forces with this dance. It is an old Cham dance, but under this name its known only since the 19th century.

The Dance of Zalongo (Albanian: Vallja e Zallongut) refers to an event in history involving a mass suicide of women from Souli and their children. The name also refers to a popular dance song commemorating the event. It is inspired by an historical event of December 1803, when a small group of Souliot women and their children were trapped by Ottoman troops in the mountains of Zalongo in Epirus. In order to avoid capture and enslavement, the women threw first their children and then themselves off a steep cliff, committing suicide. The song of the dance goes as follows in Albanian:

The song of the dance in Albanian and English:
Albanian
English

Lamtumirë, o Sul, i shkretë,
se po ndahemi per jetë.
Lamtumirë, o Sul i shkretë,
se na do t’ikim për jetë.

Ne po vdesim për liri,
se nuk duam skllavëri.
Lamtumirë, ju male e fusha,
na e punoi Pilo Gusha,
I pabesi faqezi,
s’pati turp, as perëndi.

Lamtumirë, o fusha e male,
ne vdesim pa frikë fare.
Jemi bila shqipëtare,
vdesim duke hedhur valle.
Lamtumirë, o Sul i shkretë,
lamtumir' për gjithë jetë.

Goodbye, oh desolate Souli,
for we part ways for life.
Goodbye, oh desolate Souli,
because we will leave forever.

But we will die for freedom,
because we do not want slavery.
Goodbye, oh mountains and valleys,
this was done by Pelios Gousis,
The wicked scoundrel,
had no shame, no god.

Goodbye, oh valleys and mountains,
We die without fear at all.
It’s because we are Albanians,
we die by dancing.
Goodbye, oh desolate Souli,
goodbye for all eternity.

=== Folklore ===
In 1889, the Danish ethnographer Holgert Pedersen collected Cham folk tales and published them in Copenhagen nine years later, in the book "On Albanian folklore" (Zur albanesischen Volkskunde). More than 30 Cham folk tales were collected, the majority of which about bravery and honor. The Chams of the southern Chameria region believe that they are descended from the legendary "jelims", giants from southern Albanian mythology, whose name derives from the Slavic transmission of the Greek word Έλλην (ellin) which means "Greek".

== Lifestyle ==
=== Dress ===
The folk outfits of the region are colorful. The most common men's outfit for Muslims and orthodox was the kilt known as fustanella, embroidered with silver thread, the doublet, short shirt with wide sleeves, the fez, the leather clogs with red topknots and white knee socks. Other parts of the outfit were the silver chest ornamental and the holster embroidered with silver thread used to carry a gun or a pistol.

This kind of dress was common for all Albanians, but there was difference in the length in the south where men, including the Chams, wore shorter ones, up to the knee. The kilt of high society men was made of many folds (about 250 – 300) and later was substituted by slacks and the former one was only used on special occasions.

Women's dress

The common outfit for the women became a kind of oriental silk or cotton baggy pants. They wear the cotton pants daily, whereas the silk ones only on special occasions. Other parts of this outfit were: the silk shirt weaved in their home looms and the vest embroidered with gold or silver thread, which sometimes was completed with a velvet waistcoat on it.

During 1880–1890 the town women mostly wore long skirts or dresses. They were dark red or violet and embroidered with gold thread. Other parts of this outfit were the sleeveless waistcoats, silk shirts with wide sleeves embroidered with such a rare finesse. On special occasions they also put on a half-length coat matching the color of the dress. It was embroidered with various flowery motives. Another beautiful part of the outfit is the silver belt, the silk head kerchief and a great number of jewelry such as earrings, rings, bracelets, necklaces etc.

=== Architecture ===
The main architectural monuments in the region of Chameria that belonged to Chams were mosques, homes and Muslim cemeteries, as well as old Albanian towers, known in Albanian as Kullas, which have survived, only because they are in the middle of forests scrub land, in old military zones near the Albanian border. The majority of them have been disappeared.

But, there are very few surviving mosques, which were transformed into museums, following the model of the Yugoslav communists, despite the existence of some Muslims in many localities. Muslim cemeteries are frequently desecrated by modern building works, particularly road building.

At the same time, Cham domestic and administrative buildings, mosques and cultural monuments are slowly covered by vegetation. Pasture lands once used by Chams for their cattle is now converged into forests, because of the depopulation of the region. Thus the geographical and architectural legacy of Cham presence in north western Greece is gradually vanishing.

=== Cuisine ===
Cham Albanians cuisine is seen as a mixture of Albanian and Greek cuisine, and maintains the main characteristics of the Mediterranean and the Ottoman cuisine. Their cuisine includes many kinds of cheese. Lamb is mostly baked with yogurt, differently from other cuisines. This dish has become one of the most popular in Albania.

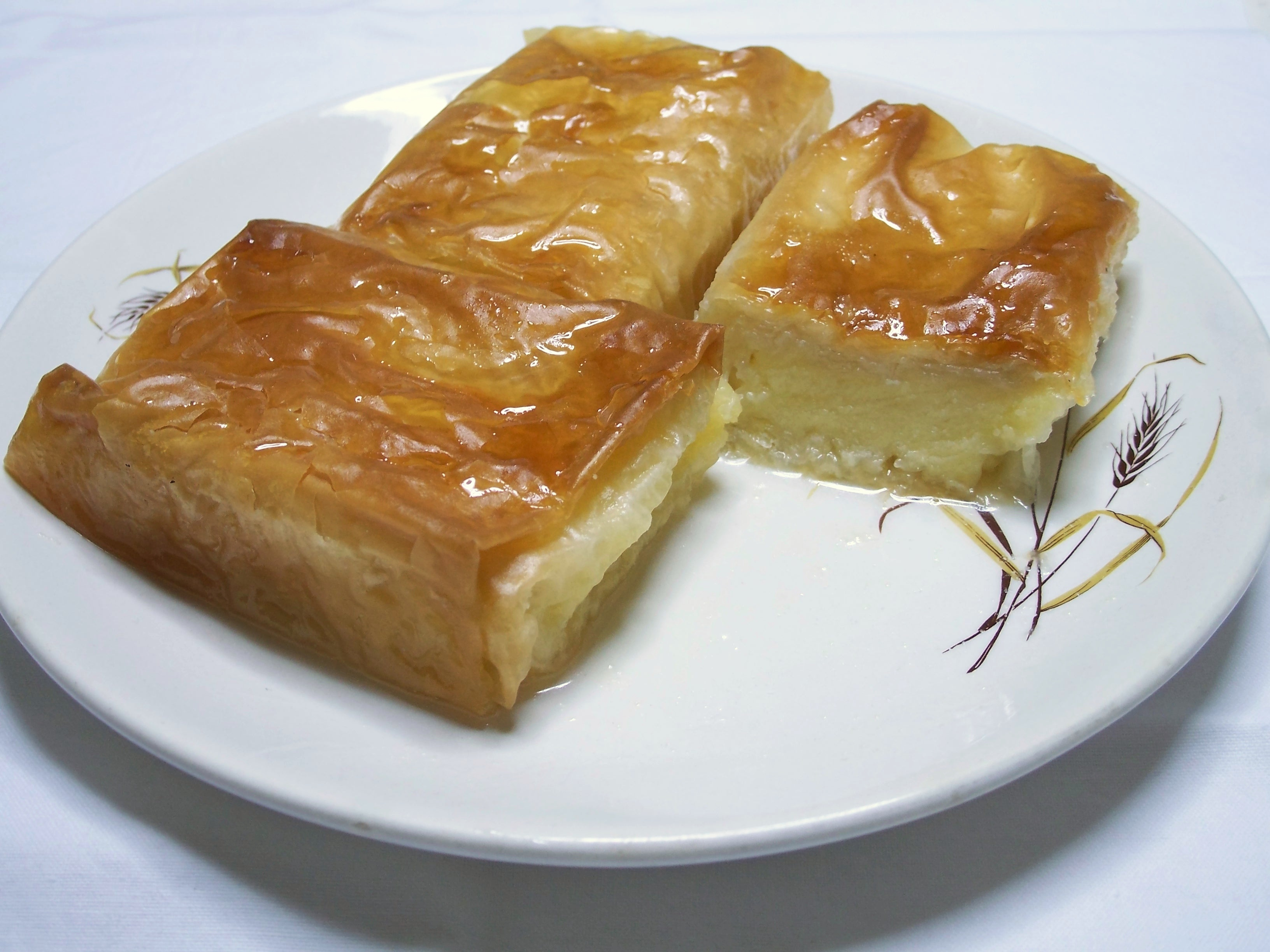
Qumështor

As with the majority of Mediterranean cuisines, Chams use a lot of vegetables and olive oil. The most common appetizers are trahana and tarator, while seafood soups are part of their cuisine. Chams are well-known in Albania for the different ways of making bread and traditional Turkish pies, the börek (called byrek in Albanian).

== Notable people ==
- Abedin Dino, founder of the League of Prizren, one of the main contributors in the Albanian independence.
- Ahmed Dino, military leader and politician.
- Ali Dino (1890–1938), famous Albanian cartoonist and member of the Hellenic Parliament.
- Rasih Dino (1865–1928), diplomat and signatory of Albania to the Treaty of London.
- Shahin Dino, deputy of the Sanjak of Preveza in the Ottoman Parliament and later Minister of Interior of Albania.
- Ali Demi, World War II hero of Albania born in Filiates, Greece in 1918, and died during a battle with Axis forces in Vlora, Albania in 1943. After him was created the first Cham battalion in ELAS army, the battalion "Ali Demi".
- Azis Tahir Ajdonati, from Paramythia, representative of Chameria in Vlora Congress, signatory of Albanian Declaration of Independence.
- Bilal Xhaferri, writer, born in Konispol, Albania.
- Hasan Tahsini, also known as Hoca Tahsin, Hodja Tahsin, Tahsin Efendi, Ahmet Nebil mathematician, philosopher and psychologist.
- Jakup Veseli, from Margariti, representative of Chameria in Vlora Congress, signatory of Albanian Declaration of Independence
- Muhamet Kyçyku (Çami), considered as the first poet of the National Renaissance, one of the best-known bejtexhinjs of Albania
- Osman Taka, one of the main contributors to the National Renaissance of Albania and a well-known dancer of his time.
- Musa Demi, revolutionary and important figure of the Albanian National Awakening
- Niazi Demi, minister of trade of Albania.
- Rexhep Demi, from Filiates, representative of Chameria in Vlora Congress, signatory of Albanian Declaration of Independence
- Tahir Demi ,(1919–1961) born in Filiates, he was an Albanian politician. He was high-ranking member of the Party of Labour of Albania and representative of Albania at Comecon.
- Aziz Çami, officer of the Albanian army and Balli Kombëtar commander.
- Qamil Çami, teacher and poet of era of the Albanian National Awakening.
- Thoma Çami, (1852–1909), from Paramythia, founder and chairman of organisation "Bashkimi", the best-known cultural club, of Rilindja Kombëtare
- Veli Gërra, from Igoumenitsa, representative of Chameria in Vlora Congress, signatory of Albanian Declaration of Independence
- Teme Sejko, rear-admiral and commander of the Albanian navy.
- Giovanni Paramithiotti (Died in 1943 New York) was an Italian sporting director of Albanian origin, born in Venice. He was one of the founders and first chairman of the football club Internazionale Milano (1908–1909). His ancestors escaped the Ottoman conquest, joining the Albanian diaspora. They moved away from Chameria, in the region of Epirus, and precisely from the current area of Paramythia, and preserved their origin as being from Paramythia with the surname Paramithiotti.
- Kolë Idromeno, (15 August 1860 – 12 December 1939), was an Albanian painter, sculptor, architect, photographer, cinematographer, composer and engineer during the Albanian Renaissance in the nineteenth century. He is widely regarded as a precursor of both realism and landscape art in Albania. His father Arsen Idromeno was a Cham Albanian from Parga.

== See also ==
- Albanian communities in Greece
- Minorities in Greece
- Treaty of London (1913)
- World War II evacuation and expulsion

== Bibliography ==
=== History ===
- Baltsiotis, Lambros (2011). "The Muslim Chams of Northwestern Greece: The grounds for the expulsion of a "non-existent" minority community". European Journal of Turkish Studies. Social Sciences on Contemporary Turkey (12). European Journal of Turkish Studies. doi:10.4000/ejts.4444. S2CID 142733144.
- Baltsiotis, Lambros (2009). The Muslim Chams from their entry into the Greek state until the start of the Greco-Italian war (1913-1940): the story of a community from millet to nation [Οι μουσουλμάνοι Τσάμηδες από την είσοδό τους στο ελληνικό κράτος μέχρι την έναρξη του ελληνοϊταλικού πολέμου (1913-1940): η ιστορία μιας κοινότητας από το millet στο έθνος] (Thesis). University of Panteion.
- Kokolakis, Mihalis (2003). Το ύστερο Γιαννιώτικο Πασαλίκι: χώρος, διοίκηση και πληθυσμός στην τουρκοκρατούμενη Ηπειρο (1820–1913) [The late Pashalik of Ioannina: Space, administration and population in Ottoman ruled Epirus (1820–1913)]. Athens: EIE-ΚΝΕ. ISBN 960-7916-11-5.
- Fabbe, Kristin (18 October 2007). Defining Minorities and Identities – Religious Categorization and State-Making Strategies in Greece and Turkey (PDF). The Graduate Student Pre-Conference in Turkish and Turkic Studies, University of Washington. Seattle, Washington. Archived from the original (PDF) on 10 June 2008.
- Fine, John Van Antwerp (1994). The Late Medieval Balkans: A Critical Survey from the Late Twelfth Century to the Ottoman Conquest. University of Michigan Press. ISBN 9780472082605.
- Fleming, Katherine Elizabeth (1999). The Muslim Bonaparte: Diplomacy and Orientalism in Ali Pasha's Greece. Princeton University Press. ISBN 9780691001944.
- Kretsi, Georgia (2002). "The Secret Past of the Greek-Albanian Borderlands. Cham Muslim Albanians: Perspectives on a Conflict over Historical Accountability and Current Rights". Ethnologia Balkanica (6). Munich, Germany: Waxmann Verlag: 171–195. OCLC 41714232. Archived from the original on 10 March 2012. Via Google Books
- Malcolm, Noel (2020). Rebels, Believers, Survivors: Studies in the History of the Albanians. Oxford University Press. ISBN 978-0192599223.
- Manta, Eleftheria (2009). "The Cams of Albania and the Greek State (1923–1945)". Journal of Muslim Minority Affairs. 4 (29).
- Mazower, Mark (2000). After The War Was Over: Reconstructing the Family, Nation and State in Greece, 1943–1960. Princeton University Press. ISBN 9780691058429.
- Meyer, Hermann Frank (2008). Blutiges Edelweiß: Die 1. Gebirgs-division im zweiten Weltkrieg [Bloodstained Edelweiss. The 1st Mountain-Division in WWII] (in German). Ch. Links Verlag. ISBN 9783861534471.
- Tsoutsoumpis, Spyros (December 2015). "Violence, resistance and collaboration in a Greek borderland: the case of the Muslim Chams of Epirus "Qualestoria" n. 2, dicembre 2015". Qualestoria: 119–138.
- Roudometof, Victor (2002). Collective memory, national identity, and ethnic conflict: Greece, Bulgaria, and the Macedonian question. Greenwood Publishing Group. ISBN 9780275976484.
- Yildirim, Onur (2006). Diplomacy and Displacement: Reconsidering the Turco-Greek Exchange of Populations, 1922-1934. CRC Press. ISBN 9780415979825.
- Psimuli, Vaso Dh. (2016). Suli dhe suljotët [Souli and the Souliots]. Toena. ISBN 9789928205728.
- Osswald, Brendan (2011). L'Epire du treizième au quinzième siècle : autonomie et hétérogénéité d'une région balkanique (Thesis). Université Toulouse le Mirail - Toulouse II.
- Anemodoura, Maria (2020). "Πολιτικές και οικονομικές δομές στην επικράτεια του Αλή πασά Τεπεντελενλή. Από τον "Ανατολικό Δεσποτισμό" έως τη νεωτερικότητα". Pergamos - Library and Information Center of National and Kapodistrian University of Athens.
- Doxiadis, Evdoxios (2018). State, Nationalism, and the Jewish Communities of Modern Greece. Bloomsbury Publishing. ISBN 9781474263474.
- Dorlhiac, Renaud (2023). "Muslims of Epirus, Muslims of Empire? The Cham Issue in Relation to Albanian, Greek and Turkish National Projects (1908–25)". In Horel, Catherine; Severin-Barboutie, Bettina (eds.). Population Displacements and Multiple Mobilities in the Late Ottoman Empire. Brill. ISBN 9789004543690.

=== Post-war politics and current situation ===
- "Document of the Committee of Cham Albanians in exile, on Greek persecution of the Chams, submitted to the Human Rights Commission of the United Nations in 1946". Texts and Documents of Albanian History. Elsie, Robert. Archived from the original on 17 June 2010.
- "L'arvanite/albanais en Grèce". L'étude Euromosaic (in French). 2006.
- Kouzas, Ioannis, Michail (2013). "The Greek-Albanian Relations (1990–2010): The Bilateral Relations under the Influence of two Issues: The Greek Minority in Albania and the Issue of the Chams". Democritus University of Thrace. doi:10.12681/eadd/33128.
- Vickers, Miranda (2002). "The Cham Issue – Albanian National & Property Claims in Greece". Archived from the original on 18 October 2015.
- Vickers, Miranda (2007). "The Cham Issue – Where to Now?". Archived from the original on 8 February 2016.
- Vickers, Miranda (February 2010). "The Greek Minority in Albania – Current Tensions" (PDF). Defence Academy of the United Kingdom. p. 3. Archived from the original (PDF) on 6 July 2011.
- Vickers, Miranda. The Cham Issue – Albanian National & Property Claims in Greece (PDF). Defence Academy of the United Kingdom.
- Bugajski, J. (2013). Return of the Balkans: Challenges to European Integration and U.S. Disengagement. Letort papers. Strategic Studies Institute, U.S. Army War College Press.

=== News ===
- "Chams still pressing for return of Greek citizenship and property". Radio Free Europe/Radio Liberty. 19 September 2002.
- "Albania protest halts Greek visit". BBC News. BBC. 1 November 2005.
