= Aziz Çami =

Albanian Army officer (1983–1943)

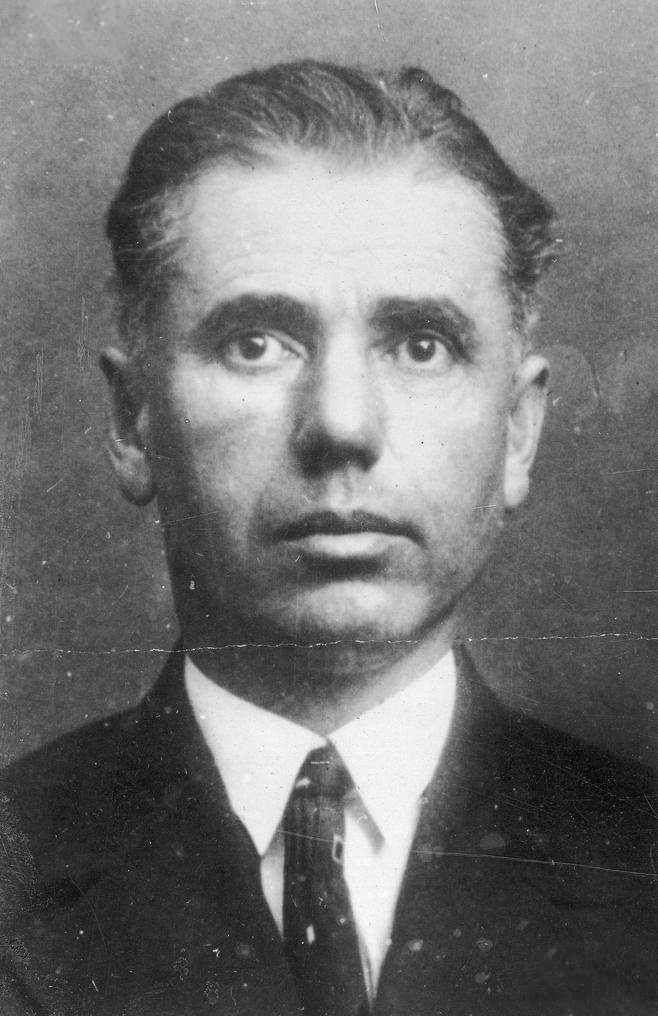
- Born: 1893; Janjar, Ottoman Empire (today Albania)
- Died: 15 December 1943 (aged 49–50); Tirana, Albanian Kingdom
- Relatives: Qamil Çami
- Military career
- Allegiance: Albania
- Branch: Albanian army Balli Kombëtar
- Conflicts: Vlora War; Albanian Resistance of World War II; Albanian Civil War (1943–1944)

Aziz Çami (1893 – 15 December 1943) was an Albanian army officer and Balli Kombëtar commander. In 1920 he was a commander in the Vlora War. In the mid-1920s, he was exiled after the restoration of the monarchy as he was a supporter of Fan Noli. In 1931, he was arrested for an assassination attempt against King Zog I. During World War II, he joined the ranks of the Balli Kombëtar and fought with Nazi Germany. He was assassinated in Tirana in 1943.

== Life ==
Aziz Çami, a member of the Cham Albanian Çami family, was born in Janjar, then part of the Ottoman kaza of Filiates. In 1917 he graduated from the military academy of Turin as an artillery officer. After his participation in the Vlora War in 1920, Çami became a follower of Fan Noli. He became an activist of the Komiteti Nacional Revolucionar (KONARE) (English: National Revolutionary Committee), created and led by Noli on 25 November 1925 in Vienna, which aimed at overthrowing the Zog of Albania regime.

Hasan Prishtina and Mustafa Merlika-Kruja, two people that led the anti Zog associations in Vienna at that time organized killing of the king by enrolling Aziz Çami and Ndok Gjeloshi, both former gendarmerie officers and convinced republicans. According to Gjeloshi memories' he studied very well the scene before the assassination attempt occurred.

On February 20, 1931, Çami and Gjeloshi attempted to assassinate Zog in Vienna, Austria on the steps of the Vienna State Opera, while the Albanian king was leaving the building after he had just enjoyed watching a Pagliacci performance. Although Zog's aide-de-camp Llesh Topallaj was killed, and the minister to the court, Eqrem Libohova was wounded, Zog himself was unharmed. According to some sources, Zog even managed to pull out his own pistol and to shoot back at the assassins without managing to hurt anyone. On Zog's return in Albania there was rejoicing for his survival, although such attempts were not uncommon: it is alleged that Zog was the subject of 55 assassination attempts during his rule. Both Çami and Gjeloshi held Yugoslavian passports at that time, although it is unlikely that Yugoslavia at that time would desire Zog's death, as that would have entailed an intervention of the Kingdom of Italy to Albania, which was not in Yugoslav interest.

According to Gjeloshi's memories, Gjeloshi killed Llesh Topallaj because he mistook him for the King, Topallaj having military clothes: instead Zog was in civil clothes; in addition it was also Gjeloshi who wounded Eqrem Libohova Gjeloshi also recalled that Çami's revolver did not work twice and Çami's third shot was unlucky, because it was already late. In addition Gjeloshi contradicted that Zog had made any attempts to defend himself; neither did the king extract his own pistol to shoot back anyone. Furthermore, Llesh Topallaj himself never covered with his body the king as some Albanian legends sustain, because Topallaj was shot by Gjeloshi and had no time to react. Everything according to Gjeloshi occurred in no more than a few seconds, because the Austrian security reacted immediately and caught both assassins.

In 1939, after the occupation of Albania by the Kingdom of Italy, the Italian authorities appointed him chief of police of Korçë, but Çami defected and joined Balli Kombëtar, a resistance organization of which he would become commander of a battalion that actively assisted German troops. In 1943 he became commander of the Vlorë forces of Balli Kombëtar, succeeding Hysni Lepenica, who had died during a conflict with the Italian troops. Çami himself was killed by Albanian communists in December 1943, in the same square where Avni Rustemi had been assassinated in 1924.
