= Cham Albanian dialect =

Dialect of the Albanian language

Cham
- Çam
- Çamërisht
- Pronunciation: [tʃaməˈɾiʃt]
- Native to: Albania, Greece
- Region: Chameria
- Language family: Indo-European: Albanoid; Albanian; Tosk; Northern; Cham
- Writing system: Latin, Greek, Ottoman Turkish

Language codes
- ISO 639-3: –
- Glottolog: came1248
- Distribution of Albanian language dialects.

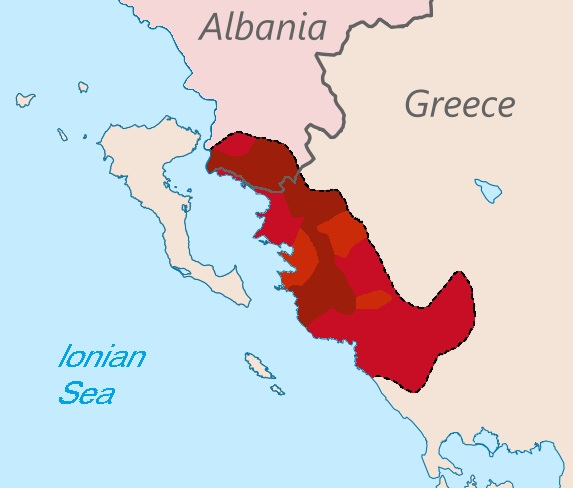
Maximum extent of Cham Albanian dialect: 19th century till 1912/1913 (Hatched line), according to Kokolakis.M. Population (irrespective of linguistic background) shown by religion: Muslim majority (Brown), Orthodox majority (Pink), Mixed (Light Brown). Colored areas do not imply that Albanian-speakers formed the majority of the population.

The Cham Albanian dialect (Albanian: Çamërisht or Dialekti çam), also called Cham Tosk or Arvanitika, (Note: In Greece, Cham Albanian is called Arvanitika, meaning 'Albanian' in Greek. It is distinct from Arvanitika proper.) is the dialect of the Albanian language spoken by the Cham Albanians, an Albanian ethnic sub-group native to the region of Chameria in southern Albania and northwestern Greece.

== Historical background ==
Albanians in the region of Epirus are attested in historical sources since the beginning of the 13th century. A Venetian document (1210) mentions that "the continent facing the island of Corfu is inhabited by Albanians" and a letter from John Apokaukos, Metropolitan of Naupaktos, to a George Dysipati (ancestor of the Shpata family). Albanian tribes moved to the south in large numbers in the early 14th century and established territories like the Despotate of Arta.

During much of the Ottoman period, most of the writing in Chameria was done in Greek or in Turkish, and Cham Albanian was a spoken dialect only, while Albanians found it difficult to find education in their native language. Christian Albanians could attend Greek schools, and Muslim Albanians Turkish schools, but Albanian language schools were highly discouraged. Nationalist sentiments during the late Ottoman era were weak in the region with Muslim Albanian Chams referring to themselves as Myslyman(Muslims) or Turks while local Orthodox Albanian speaking Christians referred to themselves as Kaur (i.e infidels) and did not find the term offensive. During the Albanian National Awakening a number of local Albanians would establish private, unrecognized Albanian-language schools. In 1870, the despot of Paramythia, Grygorios, translated the New Testament into Albanian, as his followers could not understand well the Greek language. While, in 1879, the first Albanian school of the region was created in Sagiada by father Stathi Melani. At that time, the region was under the short-lived rule of the League of Prizren.

The expulsion of Cham Albanians in the aftermath of World War II put pressure on the Cham dialect and, in both Greece and Albania, Chams were pressured to give up their dialect in favor of Standard Greek and Standard Albanian, respectively.

== Features ==
Cham Albanian is part of Tosk Albanian and is the second-southernmost variety of Albanian language, the other being Arvanitika, which is also part of Tosk Albanian. As such, Arvanitika and Cham dialect retain a number of common features. It also thus closely related to Arbëresh and Lab.

The dialect has been affected by language contact from the nearby Greek dialects much more compared to any other adjacent Albanian dialect.

=== Linguistic conservatism ===
Linguists say the Cham dialect has a conservative character, which is due to the close proximity and its continuous contacts with the Greek language. They argue that this conservative character, which is reflected in a number of peculiar features of the dialect, is endangered, as are the Albanian toponyms of the region, which are no longer in use, and which have provided valuable material for research into the historical evolution of Albanian.

=== Phonology ===
Like Arvanitika in southern Greece and Arbëresh in Italy, Cham Albanian retains some conservative features of Albanian, such as the old consonant clusters /kl/, /gl/, which in standard Albanian are q and gj, and retention of /l/ instead of /j/.

Cham Albanian	Standard Albanian	Tosk Albanian	Arvanitika	Arberesh	English
Klumësht	Qumësht	Qumësht	Kljumsht	Klumshit	'milk'
Gluhë	Gjuhë	Gjuhë/Guhë	Gljuhë	Gluhë	'language', 'tongue'
Gola	Goja	Goja	Golja	Gojë	'mouth'

Like Lab, Arbëresh language, and also the Gheg dialects of Debar and Ulqin, Cham unrounds Albanian /y/ to /i/. It also fronts the Albanian schwa ë, and merges it with e -- this is the opposite of certain Lab dialects, which tend to back the schwa into /ʌ/ (as in English "nut").

=== Morphology and Syntax ===
The declensions of verbs and nouns may vary in Cham Albanian:

- the present perfect may be done differently for reflexive verbs, and it resembles the imperfect: u kam bërë instead of jam bërë.
- due to the preservation of intervocalic l, the -je morpheme of some verbal nouns is instead -ele, so marrje may be pronounced (archaically) as marrele
- the -eshe ending is also replaced with -ele

== Written sources ==
Page from the dictionary of Markos Botsaris

The first Albanian-language book written in the region of Chameria was the Greek-Albanian dictionary by Markos Botsaris, a Souliote captain and prominent figure of the Greek War of Independence. This dictionary was the biggest Cham Albanian dictionary of its time, with 1,484 lexemes. According to albanologist Robert Elsie, it is not of any particular literary significance, but is important for our knowledge of the now extinct Suliot-Albanian dialect, a sub-branch of the Cham dialect. The dictionary is preserved at the Bibliothèque Nationale in Paris.

During the 19th century, Chams started creating bejtes, which were a new kind of poems, mainly in Southern Albania. The most well-known bejtexhi was Muhamet Kyçyku (Çami), born in Konispol. He is the only poet in Albania that has written in the Cham dialect and was apparently also the first Albanian author to have written longer poetry. The work for which he is best remembered is a romantic tale in verse form known as Erveheja (Ervehe), originally entitled Ravda ("Garden"), written about 1820. Kyçyku is the first poet of the Albanian National Renaissance.

== Sociolinguistics and survival ==
Where Chams are concentrated in Modern Albania, the dialect may still be strong especially in the elder generations, although it is increasingly influenced by Standard Albanian. Konispol and Markat are two traditionally Cham speaking municipalities that lie within the borders of Albania, and thus did not experience the expulsion.

In Greece, meanwhile, Cham Albanian may be upheld by the Orthodox Cham Albanian communities that were not expelled. According to a study by the Euromosaic project of the European Union, Albanian speaking communities live along the border with Albania in Thesprotia prefecture, the northern part of the Preveza prefecture in the region called Thesprotiko, and a few villages in Ioannina regional unit. The Arvanite dialect is still spoken by a minority of inhabitants in Igoumenitsa. In northern Preveza prefecture, those communities also include the region of Fanari, in villages such as Ammoudia and Agia. In 1978, some of the older inhabitants in these communities were Albanian monolinguals. The language is spoken by young people too, because when the local working-age population migrate seeking a job in Athens, or abroad, the children are left with their grandparents, thus creating a continuity of speakers.

Today, these Orthodox Albanian speaking communities refer to themselves as Arvanites in the Greek language and their language as Arvanitika but they call it Shqip while speaking Albanian. In contrast with the Arvanites, some have retained a distinct linguistic and ethnic identity. In the presence of foreigners there is a stronger reluctance amongst Orthodox Albanian speakers to speak Albanian, compared to the Arvanites in other parts of Greece. A reluctance has been also noticed for those who still see themselves as Chams to declare themselves as such. Researchers like Tom Winnifirth on short stays in the area have hence found it difficult to find Albanian speakers in urban areas and concluded in later years that Albanian had "virtually disappeared" in the region. According to Ethnologue, the Albanian speaking population of Greek Epirus and Greek Western Macedonia number 10,000 as of 2002. According to Miranda Vickers in 1999, Orthodox Chams today are approximately 40,000.

== See also ==
- Cham Albanians
- Souliotes
- Tosk Albanian
- Arvanitika

== Sources ==
- Baltsiotis, Lambros (2009). The Muslim Chams from their entry into the Greek state until the start of the Greco-Italian war (1913-1940): the story of a community from millet to nation [Οι μουσουλμάνοι Τσάμηδες από την είσοδό τους στο ελληνικό κράτος μέχρι την έναρξη του ελληνοϊταλικού πολέμου (1913-1940): η ιστορία μιας κοινότητας από το millet στο έθνος] (Thesis). University of Panteion.
