= Lab Albanian dialect =

Dialect of Albanian spoken in Labëria

Lab
- Labërisht
- Pronunciation: [labəˈɾiʃt]
- Native to: Albania
- Region: Labëria
- Language family: Indo-European: Albanoid; Albanian; Tosk; Southern; Lab
- Writing system: Latin, Greek, Ottoman Turkish

Language codes
- ISO 639-3: –
- Glottolog: labt1234
- Distribution of Albanian language dialects.

The Lab Albanian dialect (Albanian: Labërishtja or Dialekti lab) is a Tosk Albanian dialect associated with the wider definition of the ethnographic region of Labëria, spoken by Lab Albanians. Under this wider definition of Labëria, Lab Albanian stretches from Vlorë and Mallakastër south and east up to Gjirokastër, Lunxhëria and Sarandë. Notable aspects of Lab in Albanian and wider Balkan areal linguistics include its peculiar mix of conservative and innovative features, the lack (in some varieties) of typical Albanian Balkanisms like the admirative, and the presence of features typical of Northern Gheg dialects despite it being a Southern dialect.

== Classification ==
Labërishtja is a subdivision of the Southern Tosk group, which is itself a subdivision of Tosk Albanian, the collection of Albanian dialects south of the Shkumbin River. As such, it is most closely related to the Cham dialect of Chamëria, the Arbereshe of the old Albanian diaspora in Italy, and the Arvanitika of Arvanites in Greece.

== Characteristics ==
=== Phonological ===
Features typical of Lab include the unrounding of Albanian /y/ ([y]) to /i/ ([i]), thus merging it with the /i/ phoneme, and a velar articulation for Albanian gj ([ɟ]) and q ([c]). As such, in areas where Lab is less influenced by Standard Albanian, Albanians from elsewhere may be shocked to hear words like gjyshi ([ɟyʃi], grandfather) pronounced as gishi ([ɡiʃi]). Likewise, Lab Albanians may say they speak "shkip" ([ʃkip]), not shqip ([ʃcip]).

Lab also has some features that are more typical of Gheg dialects than Tosk ones: it preserves the Old Albanian vowel length distinction (lost elsewhere in Tosk). Although the loss of nasal vowels in Tosk is said to be a diagnostic feature separating Southern (Tosk) Albanian from Northern (Gheg) Albanian, Albanian linguists Dilo Sheper and Gjinari have reported that there are nasal vowels present in the Lab dialects of Kurvelesh and Himare, which would mean there are in fact Tosk dialects with nasal vowels, contrary to prior assumptions, although some Albanian writers like Paçarizi expressed uncertainty about the reports. Menela Totoni, meanwhile, has detected the presence of nasal vowels in the extreme southern town of Borsh. Paçarizi notes that the presence of nasal vowels in Lab might imply that the loss of nasals in Tosk can no longer be viewed as the taxonomical difference between Gheg and Tosk, and that it may have occurred in the majority of Tosk dialects after Tosk had already split from Gheg.

Standard Albanian dh ([ð]) may also be represented as a ll ([ɫ] dark L) in many Lab dialects, leading madhe (/maðɛ/, "large") to be pronounced as malle ([maɫɛ]).

Certain Lab dialects shift the Albanian schwa to a back vowel, [ʌ] (as in English nut), while others merge it with e /ɛ/ . Many Lab dialects also pronounce the schwa at the end of words, saying [pɛsʌ] instead of [pɛs] for pesë ("five"). Albanian e/ɛ/ may also become a schwa in Lab before nasal consonants.

=== Lexical ===
Lab Albanian uses different past participles than Standard Albanian, which is based on a dialect of Tosk proper, specifically the one from the ethnographic region of Dangellia due to its usage by Albanian nationalist writers. The past participle of marr (to take) is marrur (not marrë as in standard) and the past participle of them is themur, rather than thënë.

=== Morphological and syntactical ===
Lab and its sister dialect, Cham, have been found to lack many of the particularities that wider Albanian has in morphological rules and syntactical patterns. Some but not all Lab dialects lack the admirative mood, typically considered a curious and unique particularism of Albanian although there are also related phenomena in some Bulgarian dialects.

Lab has exerted some influence on Standard Albanian, for example causing the emergence of the short particle due to its use (in Lab) for compound past tenses.

Laberishtja also is peculiar in that certain Lab dialects may have (limited) use of a "have"(kam) + subjunctive formation of the future tense, which is more typically characteristic of remote Gheg dialects such as the Upper Reka dialect.

Although the idea that the Gheg/Tosk split is the oldest and most significant dialectal division in Albanian is widely viewed as canon, Lab has been found to exhibit certain "Gheg" grammatical characteristics (in addition to limited phonological characteristics such as retention of nasalization in selected Lab subdialects). Features that are typical of Gheg but not Tosk dialects but which are nevertheless found in Lab include the presence of the compound perfect and the pluperfect.

== History ==
It is believed that Lab Albanian split from its sibling dialects of Cham, Arvanitika and Arbereshe some time in the Middle Ages. Since then, its features have evolved through a variety of influences: language contact with Greek and specifically the Himariote dialect, isolation in mountainous regions and influence from Gheg dialects as Gheg speakers migrated to Lab areas in the Late Middle Ages and during the Ottoman era.
