= Janjar =

Village in Albania

- Village
- Location within Albania
- Coordinates: 39°42′16.15″N 20°15′37.75″E
- Country: Albania
- County: Vlorë
- Municipality: Konispol
- Administrative unit: Markat
- Time zone: UTC+1 (CET)
  - Summer (DST): UTC+2 (CEST)

Janjar (Albanian definite form: Janjari) is a village in the commune of Markat, part of municipality of Konispol, Albania. The village is inhabited by Albanians. As of 1995, it had 595 inhabitants. Ethnographically, this settlement belongs to the region of Çamëria.

== Geography ==
From the North-West the village borders with Ninat, from the South with Koska, and Plesavitsa; from the West with Vërva and Dishati, and from the East with Pallamba. Janjar is composed of the following neighbourhoods: Bratat, Brahimat, Fshat i Madh and Klisha.

== Notable people ==
- Aziz Çami, officer of the Albanian army and Balli Kombëtar commander
