= Tosk Albanian =

Group of varieties of the Albanian language

Tosk
- toskërisht
- Region: Albania, Kosovo, North Macedonia, Italy, Greece, Turkey
- Native speakers: 1.8 million (2011 census)
- Language family: Indo-European: Albanoid; Albanian; Tosk
- Early form: Proto-Albanian
- Dialects: Northern Tosk; Southern Tosk (Cham & Lab); Arbëresh; Arvanitika; Mandritsa
- Writing system: Albanian alphabet, formerly Elbasan

Language codes
- ISO 639-3: als
- Glottolog: alba1268 tosk1239
- Linguasphere: 55-AAA-aca
- A map showing Tosk speakers in the two palest shades of brown.

Tosk (Albanian definite form: toskërishtja) is the southern group of dialects of the Albanian language, spoken by the ethnographic group known as Tosks. The line of demarcation between Tosk and Gheg (the northern variety) is the Shkumbin River. Tosk is the basis of the standard Albanian language.

Major Tosk-speaking groups include the Myzeqars of Myzeqe, Labs of Labëria, Chams of Çamëria, Arvanites of Greece and the Arbëreshë of Italy, as well as the original inhabitants of Mandritsa in Bulgaria. In North Macedonia, there were approximately 3000 speakers in the early 1980s.

== Tosk features ==
- Rhotacism: Proto-Albanian *-n- becomes -r- (e.g. rëra "sand")
- Tosk dialects preserve the consonant sequences mb, ngj and nd which are assimilated to m, nj and n in Gheg.
- Proto-Albanian *ō becomes va.
- Nasal vowels: There is a lack of nasal vowels in Tosk (e.g. sy "eye") and Late Proto-Albanian *â plus a nasal becomes ë (e.g. nëntë "nine").
- e-vowel: The e becomes ë in some varieties of some words.
- ë-vowel: The ë may have several pronunciations depending on dialect: the ë is more backed in Labërisht dialects like that of Vuno, where mëz "foal" is [mʌz]). Final -ë drops in many Tosk dialects and lengthens the preceding vowel.
- y-vowel: The y vowel often derounds to i in Labërisht, Çam, Arvanitika, and Arbëresh (e.g. dy "two" becomes di).
- dh and ll: These sounds may interchange in some words in some varieties.
- h: This may drop in any position in some dialects.
- gl/kl: Some varieties of Çam, Arberësh, and Arvanitika retain kl and gl in place of q and gj (e.g. gjuhë "tongue" is gluhë in Çam and Siculo-Arberësh, and gljuhë in Arvanitika; klumësh for qumësht "milk" in Arbëresh).
- rr: rr becomes r in some varieties.

== Northern Tosk ==
=== Vowels ===
	Front	Central	Back
Close	i y		u
Close-mid	e		
Open-mid		ɜ	ɔ
Open		a	

IPA	Description	Written as
i	Close front unrounded vowel	i
y	Close front rounded vowel	y
e	Close-mid front unrounded vowel	e
a	Open central unrounded vowel	a
ɜ	Open-mid central unrounded vowel	ë
ɔ	Open-mid back rounded vowel	o
u	Close back rounded vowel	u

- Mid sounds e, o can also be heard as [ɛ, o], in free variation.

== See also ==
- Albanian dialects
- Lab Albanian dialect
- Cham Albanian dialect
- Arvanitika
- Arbëresh language
