= Muhamet Kyçyku =

Cham Albanian author

Muhamet Kyçyku, also known as Muhamet Çami (1784-1844) was a Cham Albanian author and one of the most famous bejtexhinj, the author of two religious poems. His major work is Erveheja written in 1820 but published in 1888.

== Life ==
He was born in Konispol on July 9, 1784, but we do not know much about his early childhood. He attended religious education for eleven years at al-Azhar in Cairo, then returned to his native village and served as an imam until his death in 1844.

Kyçyku has been a more productive author compared to others. He wrote in his Cham dialect and, apparently, was the first Albanian author to deal with the long poem. He is known for two poems with religious subjects and motives: Erveheja and Jusufi and Zylihaja. His major work is the Erveheja written in 1820, the source of which is the Persian Tûtî-nâme (The Story of a Parrot) by Ziyauddin Nakhshabî, inspired by the original Sanskrit Śukasaptati.

Another well-known work is the religiously motivated poem "Yusuf and Zylihaja", a moralizing narrative with 2430 verses, based on the story told in Surah Yusuf of the Qur'an, on the attempt of Aziz's wife to seduce and make Yusuf her own. The works written by these religious inspirations in oriental literature and beyond are well known. On this theme wrote in Persian Firdaus (935-1020) and the mystic Ja'ami (1414-1492), in Turkish Hamdullah Hamdi (1449-1508) and many others.

Kyçyk's other works are the poem Bekriu (1824) in which he condemns the drinking of rakia and wine, the historical one around 1826 for Ibrahim Pasha, the glorious campaigns of the Albanian governor of Egypt Mehmet Ali against the Greek rebellion and the poem that deals with the troubles of those who were forced to seek a morsel of bread and profit away from their homeland - the Gurbetlites.

In 1888 Jani Vreto published Ervehena adopted as a fairy tale and sanitized by the oriental lexicon.
