= Thoma Çami =

Thoma Çami was a Cham Albanian leader living in the Ottoman Empire and one of the main contributors to the revival of Albanian culture during the National Renaissance of Albania. He was a founder and the first chairman of the organization "Bashkimi", the best-known cultural club of the Albanian National Awakening. He also wrote the first scholarly history book for Albanian schools, but died before the Albanian declaration of independence.
