= Teme Sejko =

Albanian military officer (1922–1961)

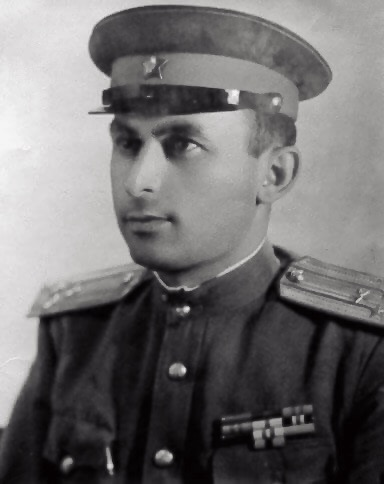
- Born: Teme Sejko; August 25, 1922; Konispol, Principality of Albania
- Died: May 31, 1961 (aged 38); Albania
- Relatives: Mehmet Sejko (Father), Shyqëranie Taka (Mother), Taho Sejko (Brother), Sulo Sejko (Brother), Nurie Sejko (Sister), Merushe Sejko (Sister), Alush Taka (Great Uncle), Osman Taka (Cousin), Rexhep Plaku (Brother in Law), Rajmond Sejko (Son), Sokol Sejko (Son)
- Military career
- Allegiance: Albanian Armed Forces
- Branch: Albanian Navy
- Service years: 1945–1960
- Rank: Rear Admiral
- Conflicts: World War II

Teme Sejko (August 25, 1922 – May 31, 1961) was an Albanian rear admiral and commander of the Albanian navy and the naval base of Durrës. In 1961 he was executed for allegedly being the leader of a pro-Soviet group that had been planning a coup d'état against Enver Hoxha by selling the Albanian Navy to the United States Sixth Fleet.

== Background ==
Teme Sejko, a member of the Sejko family of Filiates which was a Cham Albanian, Muslim family. He was born in Konispol, Albania, on August 25, 1922. His father, Mehmet Sejko, was a landlord of the region and one of the leaders of the Chameria Battalion. His mother, Shyqëranie Taka, was a housewife. She was the niece of Alush Taka who had been a commander of the Vlora War and was also related to Osman Taka. Teme Sejko had two brothers, Taho and Sulo, and two sisters, Nurie and Merushe. One of his sisters was married to Rexhep Plaku, a landlord from Konispol. His father sent Teme to Tirana, Sarandë, and Shkodër to study. He finished his studies in the Voroshilov Military Academy in Moscow.

== Activity in the Albanian army ==
In 1943 he was sent by the National Anti-Fascist Liberation Army of Albania to Konispol, where he became one of the founding members of the Chameria battalion (Albanian: Batalioni Çamëria). After World War II Teme Sejko rose rapidly through the ranks of the Albanian army, becoming in 1958 rear-admiral of the Albanian navy. During the period of poor relations with Yugoslavia, Colonel Sejko was sending undercover groups into Yugoslavia.

In July 1960 he was arrested by the Sigurimi, Albania's secret police, for allegedly being part of a joint Greek-Yugoslav-Italian-US sixth Fleet counterrevolutionary plot to overthrow the Albanian government. He was arrested along with six other military commanders: his brother, and ex-editor-in-chief of Zëri i Popullit, Taho Sejko; Liri Belishova, chairwoman of the Central Committee of the Party of Labour of Albania; and Tahir Demi, representative of Albania at Comecon. They were tried in May 1961 and convicted. Teme Sejko was sentenced to death and shot after the trial along with three other high-ranking members of the Albanian army and the Party of Labour of Albania, Tahir Demi, Abdyl Resuli and Hajri Mane on 31 May 1961. The four remaining commanders received prison sentences ranging from 15 years to life imprisonment. Teme Sejko's son, Sokol, and two of his brothers were shot as well. His wife, Shpresa, committed suicide as did his brother, Sulo. After his execution the Office of Naval Intelligence reported that Teme Sejko was a key figure of the Soviet-Albanian split. Sources in Yugoslavia at the time argued that Sejko had been accused because of his politics. It was said that the executions had arisen because Hoxha disagreed with the conclusions of a Party conference in Tirana in 1956.
