= Veli Gërra =

Albanian politician

Veli Gërra (1870 - 1945) was a leading member of the Albanian independence movement and one of the delegates of Albanian Declaration of Independence, representing the region of Chameria.

Born in Igoumenitsa, Ottoman Empire, now in modern Greece, Gërra was a teacher and a benefactor for Albanian schools. After the proclamation of the Albanian independence, Gërra gave an important contribution to the consolidation of the newly formed Ismail Qemali government, and to the defense of the Albanian territories during the Greek Occupation of Albania. He was between the Albanian representatives of the Vlore Kuvend to protest against the Great Powers' decision to award Southern Epirus to Greece in 1913. His family moved to Sarandë in 1944.
