= The New Armenia =

New York City Newspaper publication

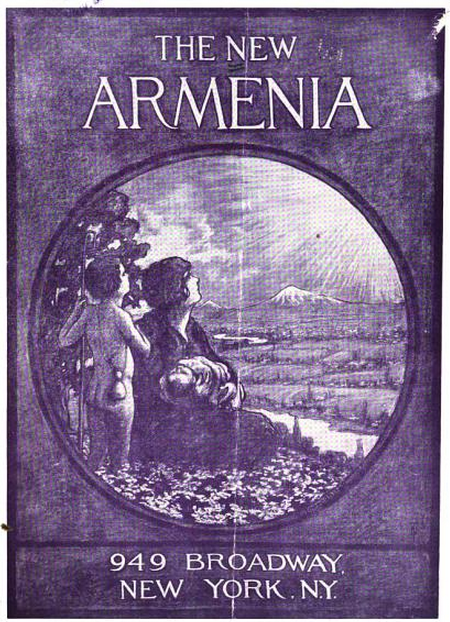
The cover page of The New Armenia, 1921

The New Armenia was a bi-monthly periodical published in New York City between 1904 and 1929. Its editor was Arshag D. Mahdesian. It was affiliated with the Reformed Hunchakian party, a splinter of the Hunchakian Party Initially named Armenia, the journal best "exemplified the efforts toward the construction of an Armenian-American ideological, cultural coverage." According to the Columbia University Libraries, it "introduced the English-speaking world to Armenian history, culture and national aspirations."
