= Tahir Demi =

Albanian politician

Tahir Demi (1919–1961) was an Albanian politician. He was high-ranking member of the Party of Labour of Albania and representative of Albania at Comecon. In 1960 he was arrested and sentenced to death in 1961 for being a member of a pro-Soviet group, led by Rear Admiral Teme Sejko, that had been planning a coup d'état against Enver Hoxha.

== Life ==
Tahir Demi, a member of the Demi family, was born in Filiates, modern northwestern Greece (Chameria) in 1919. In the 1930s he studied at the faculty of law of the University of Tirana. He was married to Sadete Demi Toto and has 3 children Pellumb, Ilirjan, Teuta. In 1943 he joined the National Liberation Movement of Albania and became a member of the Party of Labour of Albania. After World War II he became chairman of the Party of Labour committee of Elbasan District and Albania's delegate at Comecon.

In July 1960 he was arrested by the Sigurimi, Albania's secret police, for being part of an alleged joint Greek-Yugoslav-Italian-US Sixth Fleet counterrevolutionary plot to overthrow the Albanian government. He was arrested along with seven military commanders including Teme Sejko, a Rear Admiral of the Albanian Navy. The other defendants included ex-editor-in-chief of Zëri i Popullit Taho Sejko and Liri Belishova, chairwoman of the Central Committee of the Party of Labour of Albania. They were tried in May 1961 and convicted. Tahir Demi was sentenced to death and executed after the trial along with three other high-ranking members of the Albanian army and the Party of Labour of Albania, Teme Sejko, Abdyl Resuli and Hajri Mane on 31 May 1961. The four remaining defendants received prison sentences ranging from 15 years to life imprisonment. According to some sources the executions had arisen because Enver Hoxha disagreed with the conclusions of a Party conference in Tirana in 1956.
