= Rexhep Demi =

Albanian politician and activist involved in the Albanian National Awakening

Rexhep Demi (1864–1929) was a leading member of the Albanian independence movement and one of the delegates of Albanian Declaration of Independence, representing the region of Çamëria. He was a minister in the Provisional Government of Albania.

He was born in Filiates (Albanian: Filati) in 1864 to a Muslim Albanian family, and he died in 1929.
