= Markat =

- Administrative unit
- Location within Albania
- Coordinates: 39°44′N 20°12′E
- Country: Albania
- County: Vlorë
- Municipality: Konispol

Population (2011)
  - Administrative unit: 1,859
- Time zone: UTC+1 (CET)
  - Summer (DST): UTC+2 (CEST)

Markat is a village and a former municipality in Vlorë County, southern Albania. In the 2015 local government reform, it became a subdivision of the municipality Konispol. The population in the 2011 census was 1,859. The municipal unit consists of the villages Dishat, Vërvë, Shalës, Markat, Ninat and Janjar and all villages are inhabited by Muslim Cham Albanians.
