= List of settlements in Thesprotia =

This is a list of settlements in Thesprotia, Greece:

- Achladea
- Aetos
- Agia Kyriaki
- Agia Marina
- Agioi Pantes
- Agios Nikolaos
- Agios Vlasios
- Ampelia
- Ampelonas
- Anavryto
- Argyrotopos
- Asprokklisi
- Avlotopos
- Charavgi
- Choika
- Chrysavgi
- Drimitsa
- Elataria
- Eleftheri
- Faneromeni
- Faskomilia
- Filiates
- Foiniki
- Frosyni
- Gardiki, Filiates
- Gardiki, Souli
- Geroplatanos
- Giromeri
- Glyki
- Gola
- Graikochori
- Grika
- Igoumenitsa
- Kallithea, Filiates
- Kallithea, Souli
- Karioti
- Karteri
- Karvounari
- Kastri
- Katavothra
- Kato Xechoro
- Kefalochori
- Keramitsa
- Kerasochori
- Kestrini
- Kokkinia
- Kokkinolithari
- Koritiani
- Koukoulioi
- Kouremadi
- Kryoneri
- Kryovrysi
- Krystallopigi
- Kyparisso
- Ladochori
- Leptokarya
- Lia
- Lista
- Malouni
- Margariti
- Mavroudi
- Mazarakia
- Mesovouni
- Milea
- Nea Selefkeia
- Neochori
- Pagkrates
- Palaiochori
- Palaiokklisi
- Palampas
- Paramythia
- Parapotamos
- Pente Ekklisies
- Perdika
- Petousi
- Petrovitsa
- Pigadoulia
- Plaisio
- Plakoti
- Platanos
- Plataria
- Polydroso
- Prodromi
- Psaka
- Ragi
- Raveni
- Rizo
- Sagiada
- Saloniki
- Samonida
- Sevasto
- Sideri
- Skandalo
- Smertos
- Spatharaioi
- Syvota
- Trikoryfo
- Tsamantas
- Tsangari
- Vavouri
- Vrysella
- Xechoro
- Xirolofos
- Zervochori

== See also ==
- List of towns and villages of Greece
