= Karvounari =

Karvounari Καρβουνάρι
- Community
- Location within Greece
- Coordinates: 39°23.5′N 20°29′E
- Country: Greece
- Administrative region: Epirus
- Regional unit: Thesprotia
- Municipality: Souli
- Municipal unit: Paramythia

Population (2021)
  - Community: 437
- Time zone: UTC+2 (EET)
  - Summer (DST): UTC+3 (EEST)

Karvounari (Greek: Καρβουνάρι) is a village and a community in the municipal unit of Paramythia in Thesprotia, Greece. Its population in 2021 was 437. It is situated at about 140 m elevation. It is 5 km northeast of Margariti, 8 km southwest of Paramythia and 22 km southeast of Igoumenitsa.

== History ==
Like all other Muslim Cham communities, the population was affected by the annexation of the region by Greece. In 1913, the village had a total population of 1,146 which was more than halved by 1920 as 496 remained. Many had migrated to Albania or Turkey.

In 1928, representatives from the Cham communities in Paramythia, Karvounari and Filiates, requested the opening of two Muslim schools which they would fund themselves. The Greek authorities officially rejected the request, arguing that "these Muslim schools would serve Albanian state propaganda by promoting an anti-Greek sentiment among the Chams of Greece". Regardless, the Greek government allowed their operation unofficially because it could close them as illegal at any time, and could also claim that their function fulfilled demands for Albanian schools in Chameria. A mass exodus of Chams from Greece occurred as a result of the greco-italian war and the German occupation of Greece in the 1940s, so that today no such population exists.

== Notable people ==
- Spyros Gogolos, Greek footballer

== See also ==
- List of settlements in Thesprotia

== Sources ==
- Baltsiotis, Lambros (2009). The Muslim Chams from their entry into the Greek state until the start of the Greco-Italian war (1913-1940): the story of a community from millet to nation [Οι μουσουλμάνοι Τσάμηδες από την είσοδό τους στο ελληνικό κράτος μέχρι την έναρξη του ελληνοϊταλικού πολέμου (1913-1940): η ιστορία μιας κοινότητας από το millet στο έθνος] (Thesis). University of Panteion.
