= Agios Nikolaos, Thesprotia =

Agios Nikolaos Άγιος Νικόλαος
- Community
- Location within Greece
- Coordinates: 39°42′N 20°19′E
- Country: Greece
- Administrative region: Epirus
- Regional unit: Thesprotia
- Municipality: Filiates
- Municipal unit: Filiates

Population (2021)
  - Community: 45
- Time zone: UTC+2 (EET)
  - Summer (DST): UTC+3 (EEST)

Agios Nikolaos (Greek: Άγιος Νικόλαος) is a village in the municipality of Filiates, Thesprotia, Greece. It is situated in the forested mountains near the Albanian border. The river Kalpakioti flows east of the village. In 2011 its population was 78. It is 3 km southeast of the Albanian border, 12 km north of Filiates town, 23 km northeast of Igoumenitsa, 33 km southeast of Sarandë (Albania) and 45 km west of Ioannina. The name of the village means Saint Nicholas in English.

== Population ==
Historical population
| Year | Pop. | ±% |
|---|---|---|
| 1991 | 211 | — |
| 2001 | 130 | −38.4% |
| 2011 | 78 | −40.0% |
| 2021 | 45 | −42.3% |

== See also ==
- List of settlements in Thesprotia
