= Ladochori =

Village in Thesprotia, Epirus, Greece

Ladochori Λαδοχώρι
- Village
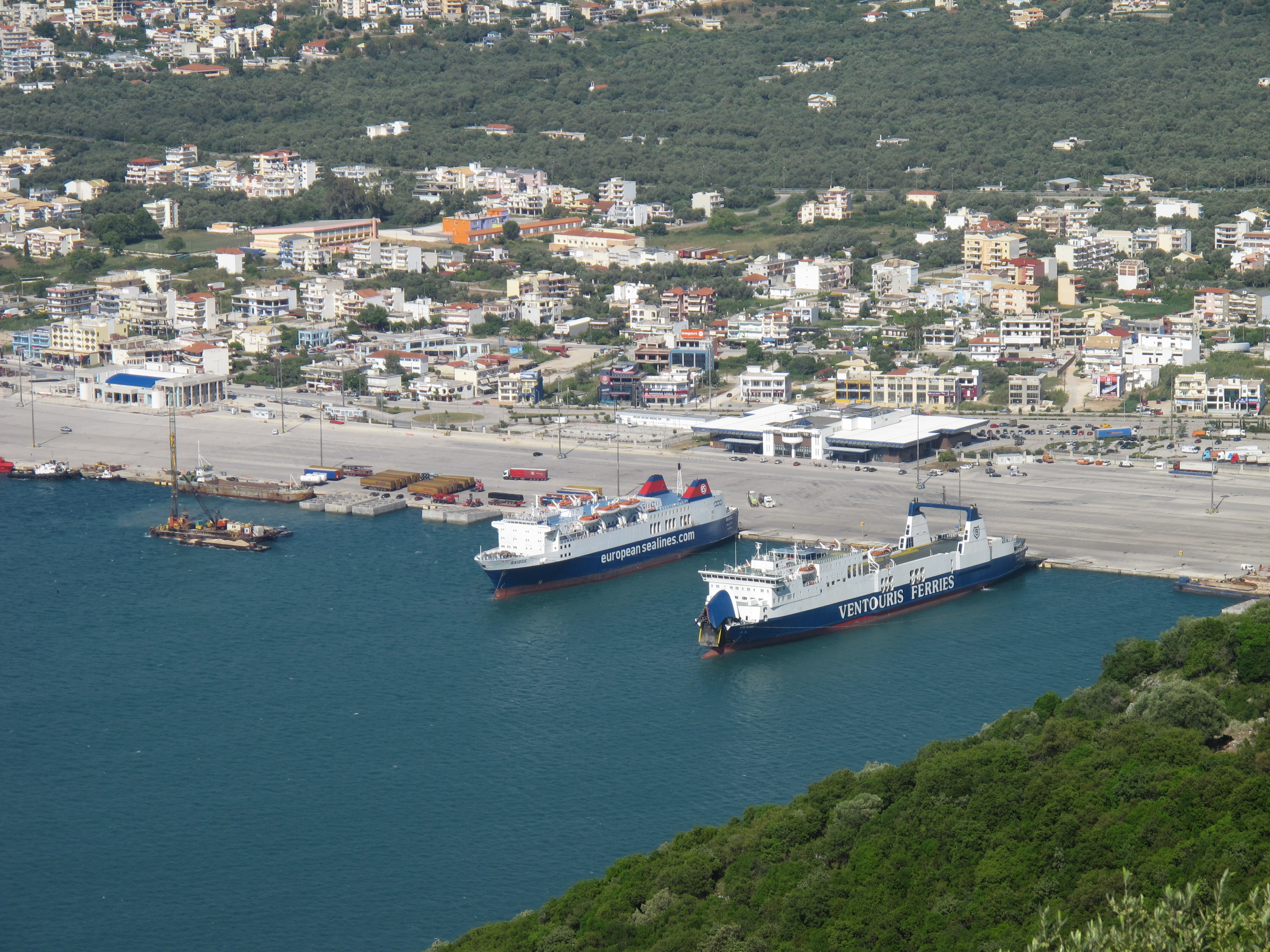
- Ladochori
- Interactive map of Ladochori
- Location within Greece
- Coordinates: 39°29′17.2″N 20°16′4.1″E
- Country: Greece
- Region: Epirus
- Regional unit: Thesprotia

Ladochori (Greek: Λαδοχώρι, romanized: Ladokhóri) is a village in Thesprotia, Epirus, Greece. Until 1927, the village was known as Lédezda (Λέδεζδα). It is bordered by Igoumenitsa in the north, Plataria in the south, Graikochori in the east, and by the Ionian Sea to the west. Today, Ladochori is a suburb of the town of Igoumenitsa. Its seafront is part of the town's new port, as well as where many of its public services are located. Due to the construction of Egnatia Street, all the residents from the old settlement of Ladochori were given olive groves in the area of the modern settlement free of charge, as well as a large monetary compensation. Since then, modern Ladochori has been extensively built. In 1991, the population was 297, down from 341 in 1981.
