= Katavothra =

Katavothra Καταβόθρα
- Community
- Location within Greece
- Coordinates: 39°21′N 20°24′E
- Country: Greece
- Administrative region: Epirus
- Regional unit: Thesprotia
- Municipality: Igoumenitsa
- Municipal unit: Margariti

Population (2021)
  - Community: 192
- Time zone: UTC+2 (EET)
  - Summer (DST): UTC+3 (EEST)
- Vehicle registration: ΗΝ

Katavothra (Greek: Καταβόθρα, Albanian: Luarat) is a village in Thesprotia, Epirus, Greece.

Until the end of World War II it was mainly inhabited by a Cham Albanian community. During the Interwar period the gendarmerie of Preveza under colonel Stavrakakis often sent notifications to the High Administration of Epirus concerning the activities of the Albanian mayor of the town Daut Buza, which the gendarmerie labeled as anti-national. The semi-demolished minaret of the mosque of present-day Katavothra is one of the very few which still stood after World War II in the region.
