= Polydroso, Thesprotia =

Polydroso Πολύδροσο
- Community
- Location within Greece
- Coordinates: 39°37′N 20°30′E
- Country: Greece
- Administrative region: Epirus
- Regional unit: Thesprotia
- Municipality: Souli
- Municipal unit: Paramythia

Population (2021)
  - Community: 48
- Time zone: UTC+2 (EET)
  - Summer (DST): UTC+3 (EEST)

Polydroso (Greek: Πολύδροσο, before 1957: Βλαχώρι - Vlachori) is a small village in the municipal unit of Paramythia in Thesprotia, Greece. It is situated on a forested mountainside above the left bank of the river Thyamis, at about 450 m elevation. It is 10 km southwest of Voutsaras, 24 km northeast of Igoumenitsa and 31 km west of Ioannina. The Greek National Road 6 (Igoumenitsa - Ioannina - Larissa) passes east of the village.

== Population ==
Historical population
Year	Pop.	±%
1981	107	—
1991	154	+43.9%
2001	86	−44.2%
2011	73	−15.1%
2021	48	−34.2%

== History ==
Archaeological remains in the surrounding area date as far back as the 4th century BC. The present settlement was founded around 1790, and it is documented since 1827. Many of the present residents descend from people who arrived here from the village Sotira in Dropull i Sipërm (Ano Deropoli), Albania around 1800.

== See also ==
- List of settlements in Thesprotia
