= Spyros Gogolos =

Greek footballer

Personal information
- Full name: Spyridon Gogolos
- Date of birth: 11 August 1978 (age 48)
- Place of birth: Thesprotia
- Height: 1.84 m (6 ft 0 in)
- Position: Defender

Senior career*
Years	Team	Apps	(Gls)
1995–1997	Kerkyra	21	(0)
1997–1999	Kallithea	72	(1)
2000–2002	Panionios	39	(0)
2002–2004	Kallithea	54	(0)
2004–2008	Aris	59	(3)
2008–2009	PAS Giannina	17	(0)
2009–2010	Ermis Aradippou	9	(0)
2010–2011	Agrotikos Asteras	28	(0)
2011–2012	Anagennisi Dherynia	17	(0)
2012–2013	Olympiacos Volos	31	(1)
2013–2014	Lamia	22	(4)
Total		369	(9)

International career
1999	Greece U21	5	(0)
- * Club domestic league appearances and goals

Spyros Gogolos (Greek: Σπύρος Γόγολος, born 11 August 1978) is a retired Greek footballer, who played as a defender.

== Club career ==
He was born on 11 August 1978 in Thesprotia. His family origins are from Karvounari Thesprotia a village near Paramythia in Epirus.

He started playing football for Kerkyra. He joined the first team in 1995, at a time when the latter was competing in the Fourth Division, without getting to play in that season. At the end of the season Kerkyra was promoted. Gogolos played 21 Third Division and 2 Cup games during the 1996–97 season and became known as a player.

In 1997, he moved to Kallithea, then a Second Division team. In his two and a half seasons he would be in the starting lineup in most games. In 2000 he signed a 4,5 year contract with PAOK. Then he moved to Panionios in the First Division. Firstly, he thought that his move was a loan transfer but eventually it was a free transfer as an exchange for Dimitris Nalitzis' transfer.

In January 2002, Gogolos returned to Kallithea and helped the team get promoted to the First Division. He continued playing there until 2004, when he joined Aris of Thessaloniki.

During the 2007–08 season with Aris, Gogolos was not fielded by his coach for a single league match. He thus reached consensus with the team for the termination of his contract mid-season Shortly after, Gogolos signed up for PAS Giannina. His last game with Aris on 29 November 2007 was vs the Wanderers in Bolton, for the UEFA Cup, as a late substitution, where he bore some of the responsibility for the equaliser by Giannakopoulos. Still, upon his departure after four years with Aris, he was given credit by the press for his commitment, for the helping the team rebound from the Second Division and, finally, for his dignified farewell statement.
