= Paramythia =

Paramythia Παραμυθιά
- Municipal unit
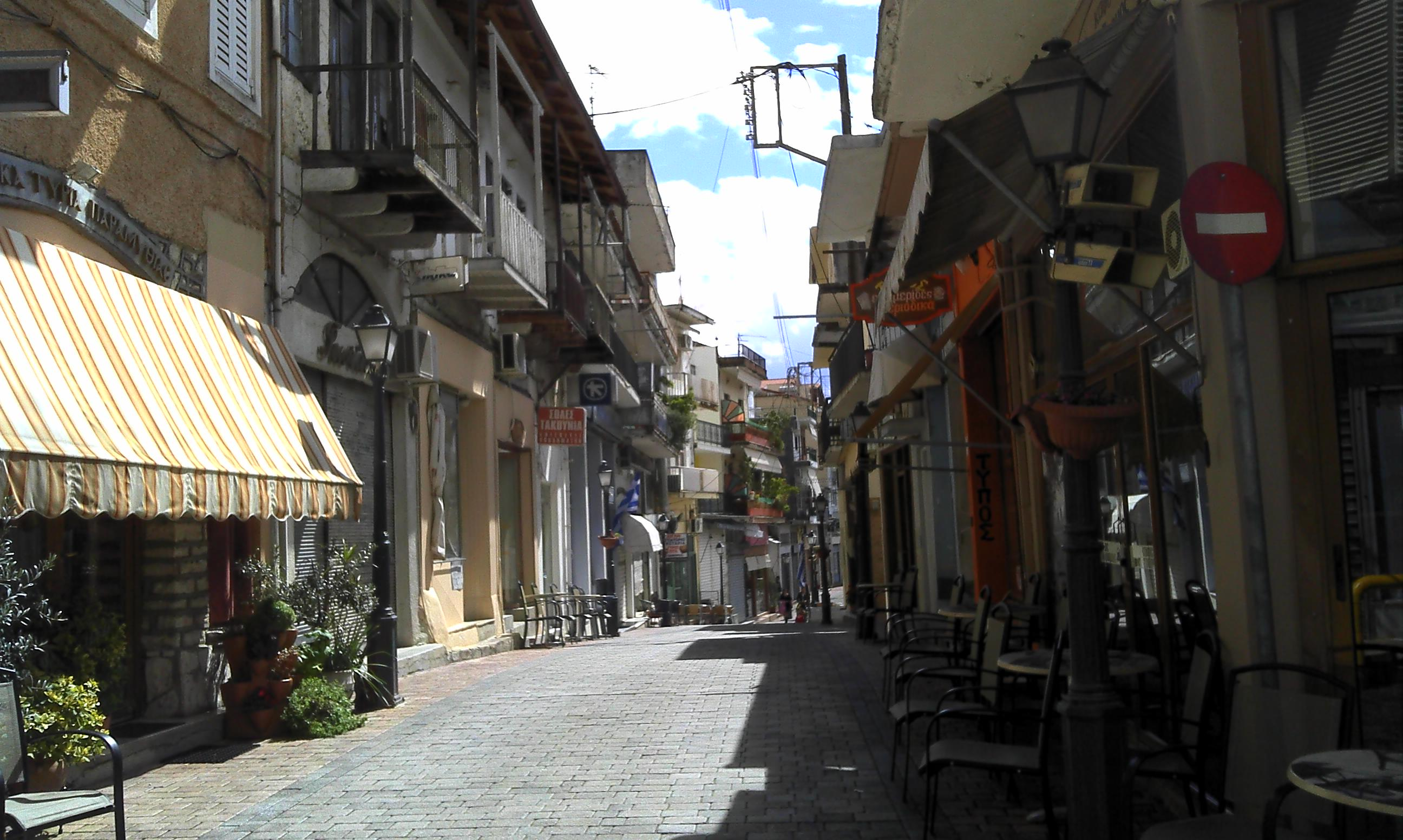
- Central street of Paramythia

- Location within the regional unit

- Location within Greece
- Coordinates: 39°28′N 20°30′E
- Country: Greece
- Administrative region: Epirus
- Regional unit: Thesprotia
- Municipality: Souli

Area
  - Municipal unit: 342.2 km^{2} (132.1 sq mi)

Population (2021)
  - Municipal unit: 6,463
  - Municipal unit density: 18.89/km^{2} (48.92/sq mi)
  - Community: 2,608
- Time zone: UTC+2 (EET)
  - Summer (DST): UTC+3 (EEST)
- Postal code: 462 00
- Area code: 26660
- Vehicle registration: ΗΝ
- Website: www.dimos-souliou.gr

Paramythia (Greek: Παραμυθιά) is a town and a former municipality in Thesprotia, Epirus, Greece. Since the 2011 local government reform it is part of the municipality Souli, of which it is the seat and a municipal unit. The municipal unit has an area of 342.197 km^{2}. The town's population is 2,608 as of the 2021 census.

Paramythia acts as a regional hub for several small villages in the Valley of Paramythia and features shops, schools, a gym, a stadium and a medical center. Primary aspects of the economy are agriculture and trade. The town is built on the slopes of Mount Gorilla and overlooks the valley, below. The Castle of Paramythia was built on a hill in one of the highest points of the town during the Byzantine period and today is open to tourists.

The A2 motorway (Egnatia Odos), which links Igoumenitsa with Ioannina, goes through the valley north of the town of Paramythia.

== Name ==
During the Byzantine and much of the Ottoman era the town was known in Greek as Agios Donatos (Greek: Άγιος Δονάτος), after the town's patron saint Saint Donatus of Evorea. This is the basis of the Albanian (Ajdonat or Ajdhonat) and the Turkish name (Aydonat). The name "Paramythia" derives from one of the Virgin Mary's names in Greek ("Paramythia" in Greeks means comforter). One of the neighbourhoods of the town was named after its church which was dedicated to Virgin Mary (Paramythia) and the toponym replaced the previous name most likely in the 18th century, as in the 17th century in Ottoman official documents, the town and the corresponding kaza (district) still appear as Aydonat. In Aromanian, it is known as Pãrmãthia or Pãrmãthii.

== Geography ==
The Paramythia municipal unit consists of 23 communities. The total population of the municipal unit is 7,459 (2011). The town of Paramythia itself has a population of 2,730 and lies in an amphitheatre at an altitude of 750 m, at the foot of Mount Gorilla, between the Acheron and the Kalamas rivers. The Gorilla range (altitude 1,658 m) lies on the eastern side of the city and the Chionistra (1,644 m) to the Northeast. At the city limits is the Kokytos (Cocytus) River, one of the rivers of the underworld in Greek mythology. Paramythia's valley is one of the largest in Thesprotia and is one of the major agricultural areas in Epirus.

== History ==
=== Antiquity ===
The earliest known inhabitants of the area were the Greek tribe of the Chaonians. Late bronze antiquities have been found in the "Tsardakia" area were a Mycenean settlement probably existed.

Paramythia originated with the ancient Chaonian city of Photike (Ancient Greek: Φωτική), named after Photios, a leader of the Chaonians. A famous hoard of bronzes dating from the mid 2nd Century AD, nineteen bronze sculptures were discovered during the 1790s, near the village of Paramythia. Soon after their discovery, the hoard was dispatched to St Petersburg, to become part of Catherine the Great's collection. After her death, the original hoard was dispersed to various European collections. Eventually, fourteen of the statuettes reached the British Museum.

=== Medieval era ===
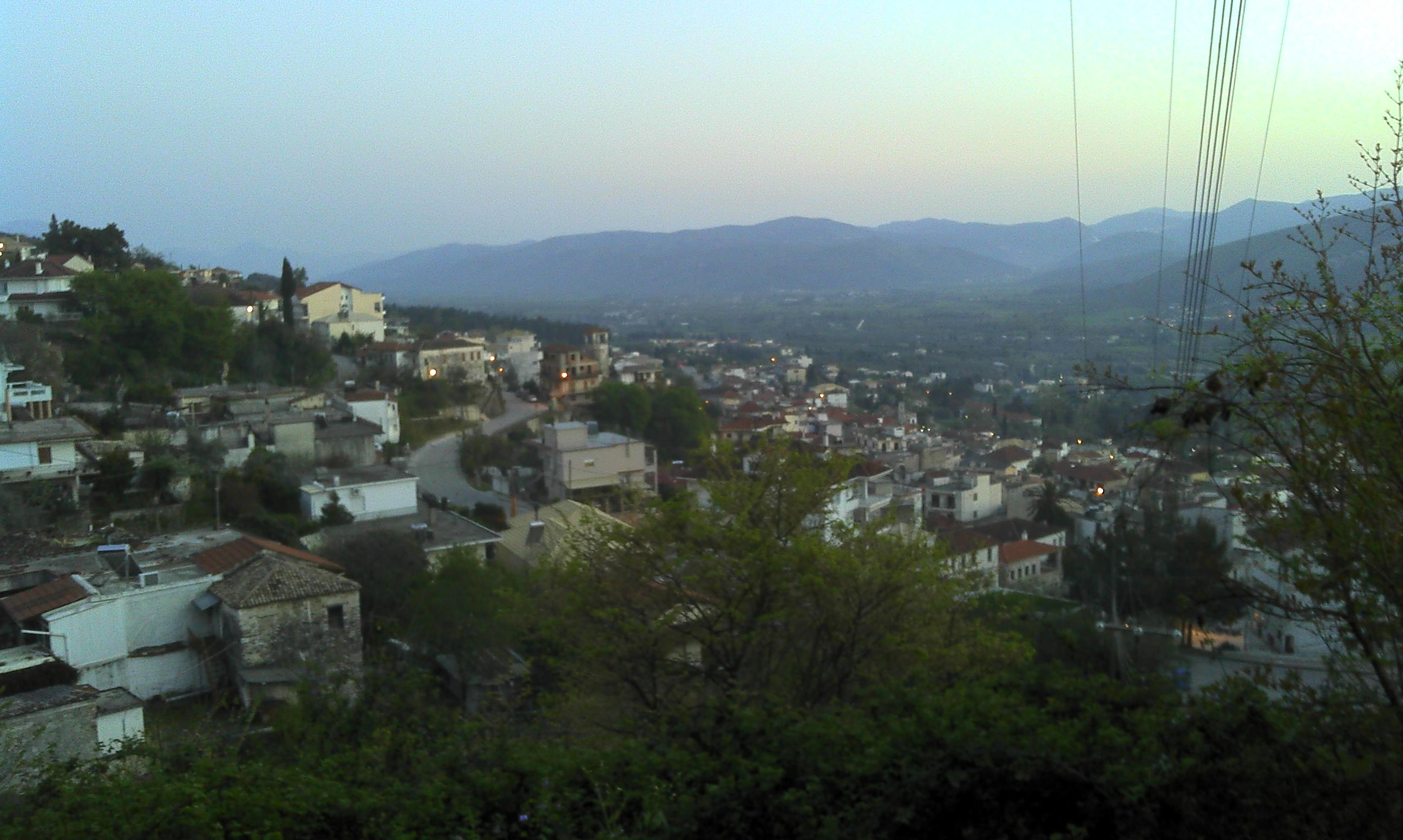
Paramythia seen from the upper street during the dusk

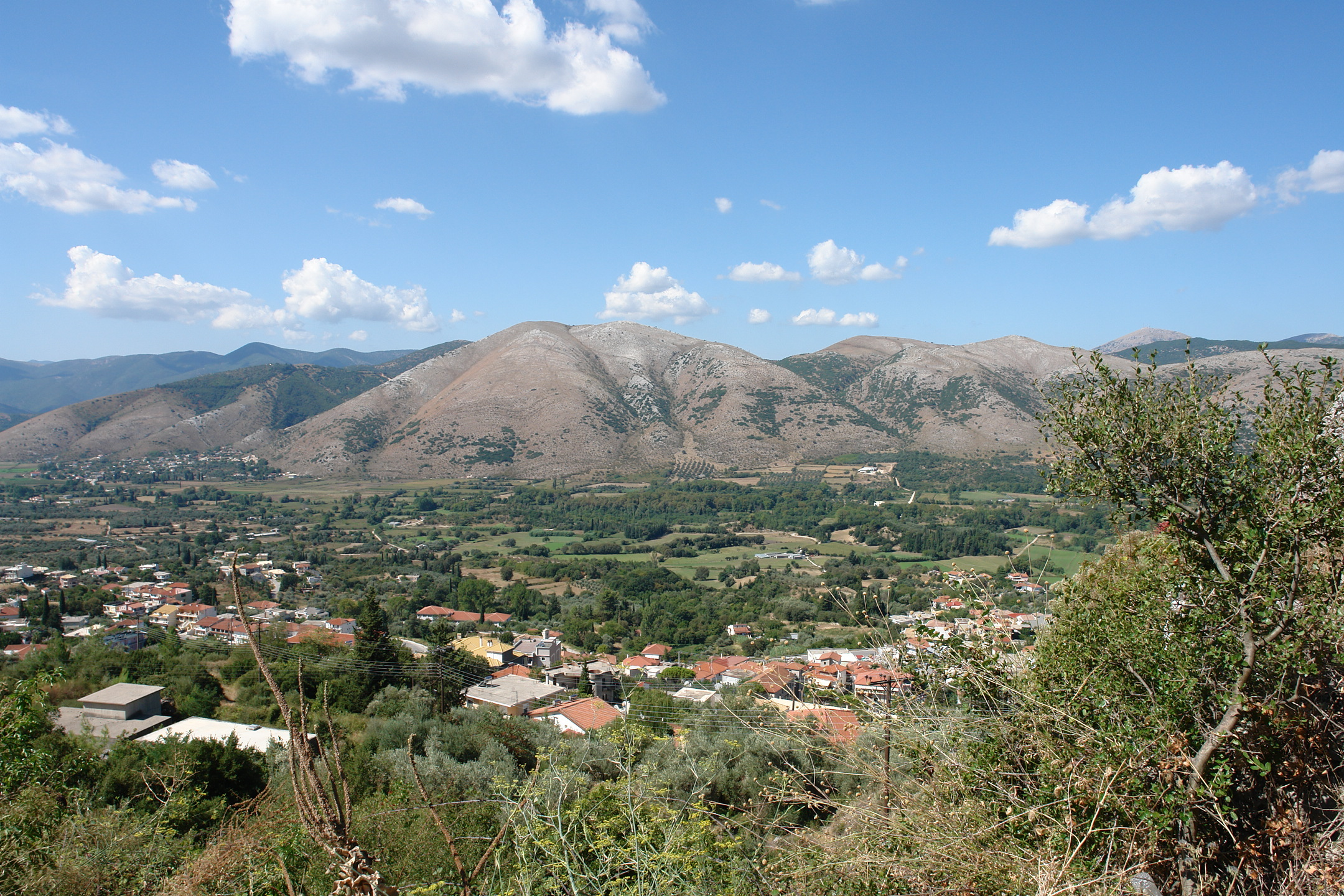
Paramythia as seen from the Byzantine castle

Photike, as with the rest of Epirus, became part of the Roman and subsequently Byzantine Empires. In the late Roman era it was the seat of a Bishopric and was renamed after Saint Donatus of Evorea.

Following the fall of Constantinople to the Fourth Crusade in 1204, Photike became part of the Despotate of Epirus. The Despotate remained independent for the next two centuries, maintaining the Greek Byzantine traditions. In 1359 the Greek notables of the region together with those of nearby Ioannina sent a delegation to the Serb ruler Symeon to support their independence against possible attacks by Albanian tribesmen. The town remained part of the Despotate of Epirus but during the reign of despot Thomas II Preljubović the Greek commanders of Photike/Agios Donatos refused to accept them as their ruler. The town fell to the Ottomans in 1449. Paramythia was part of the Ottoman Sanjak of Ioannina.

=== Ottoman ===
In 1572 Paramythia came under the short term control of a Greek rebellion. According to Venetian reports Greek revolutionary leader Petros Lantzas killed the Ottoman commander of Paramythia. Up to the late 16th century and early 17th century, most of the population of Paramythia was Christian. In the 1583 defter, many of the names of household heads are typical Christian Albanian names (Gjon, Lekë, Pal). Most inhabitants possibly spoke Albanian within their household, but there were also Greek-speakers and bilingualism between Albanian and Greek was likely in the area. In the Ottoman period, much of the economic and political life of Paramythia was controlled by the feudal landholding families which emerged in the region. One of the most significant of these in Paramythia was the Albanian Proniari (alternatively Pronjo or Pronios) family which had firmly established itself by the late 18th century. Cham Albanian landlords of Paramythia and Margariti were in conflict with Ali Pasha of Yannina during much of the Pashalik of Yanina era. These families by the end of the Ottoman era would hold almost 90% of the arable land of the plain of Paramythia. This economic division between mostly Muslim landlords and Christian peasants contributed strongly to a political shift of a part of the population towards the Kingdom of Greece since the late 19th century.

A Greek language school, had been attested since 1682. It declined and closed in the mid-18th century, however, another Greek school was continuously operating from the late 17th century and at 1842 was expanded with additional classes. In 1854 a major revolt took place in Epirus and the town came briefly under the control of guerilla Souliote forces that demanded the union of Epirus with Greece.

=== Contemporary ===
During the early 20th century, although the majority of local Muslims were Albanian-speaking, there were considerable communities Greek-speaking and Romani Muslim communities, which had emigrated to the area from southern Greece after 1821. The Christian Orthodox community in the lowland area in Paramythia was mainly Albanian-speaking. After the end of the Balkan Wars (1912–1913) the town became part of the Greek state, as with the rest of Epirus region. In the interwar period, Paramythia was a centre of the Albanian-speaking area of Chameria and mainly an Albanian-speaking market town that after 1939 increasingly became Greek-speaking. During the Greek-Italian War the town was burned by Cham Albanian bands (28 October – 14 November 1940) and Greek notables were killed. In the following Axis occupation of Greece (1941-1944) the town had a population of 6,000 inhabitants; 3,000 Greeks and 3,000 Cham Albanians. In 1928, representatives from the Cham Albanian communities in Paramythia, Karvounari and Filiates, requested the opening of two Muslim schools which they would fund themselves. The Greek authorities officially rejected the request, fearing that these Muslim schools would serve Albanian state propaganda by promoting an anti-Greek sentiment among the Chams of Greece. Regardless, the Greek government allowed their operation unofficially because it could close them as illegal at any time, and could also claim that their function fulfilled demands for Albanian schools in Chameria.

Paramythia first fell under Italian control and then under German rule after Italy's capitulation (September 1943). As Italy entered its phase of capitulation throughout 1943, EDES tried to approach the Cham community unsuccessfully in May 1943, but they reached a brief ceasefire in July 1943 in the area of Paramythia. Italian collapse in the region was followed by the entry of the German army. In Paramythia, as the Italian units were disbanding, the Cham militia clashed with left wing ELAS which tried to disarm them. ELAS controlled part of the town briefly, but was quickly routed by the German advance. Members of the Geheime Feldpolizei were also sent to Paramythia to organize and use the Cham groups. In an operation which followed by the 1st Mountain Division with the assistance of the Cham militia during the week of September 20–29 up to 200 Greeks in and around Paramythia were killed and 19 municipalities were destroyed. In one incident, on the night of 27 September 1943, Cham militias arrested 53 Greek civilians in Paramythia and executed 49 of them two days later. This action was orchestrated by the brothers Nuri and Mazar Dino (an officer of the Cham militia) in order to get rid of the town's Greek representatives and intellectuals. According to German reports, Cham militias were also part of the firing squad. On September 30, the Swiss representative of the International Red Cross, Hans-Jakob Bickel, visited the area and confirmed the attacks committed by the Cham militia in collaboration with the Axis forces.

On June 26–27, 1944, under orders from the Allied headquarters the town was taken by the National Republican Greek League (EDES). There are competing timelines about the events of the surrender of the town. Some sources mention that EDES possibly negotiated their entry in Paramythia with the German army which was about to retreat together with the Cham units. The Cham militia then tried unsuccessfully to capture the town. Others mention that EDES took the town after defeating the Nazi German-Cham defence. The Germans retreated without significant losses, while the remaining armed Albanian units were disarmed. Cham militia and German Wehrmacht then tried unsuccessfully to recapture the town. EDES issued a proclamation which guaranteed the safety of the Cham community and their property, but soon after it established itself in the town the expulsion of Cham Albanians began. According to an estimate, 600 Albanians were killed in Paramythia, while other accounts limit this number to 300. Almost all buildings inhabited by Muslim Albanians in the town were destroyed during World War II warfare.

== Notable inhabitants ==
- Sotirios Voulgaris, the notable Greek who founded the jewelry and luxury goods company Bulgari. His jewelry store in Paramythia survives. Following his wish, his sons funded the building of the elementary school of the town.
- Dionysius the Philosopher (1560–1611), Greek monk and revolutionary
- Alexios Pallis (1803–1885), Greek writer
- Azis Tahir Ajdonati, an Albanian from Paramythia, representative of Chameria in the Vlora Congress, signatory of Albanian Declaration of Independence.

== Subdivisions ==
The municipal unit Paramythia is subdivided into the following communities (constituent villages in brackets):

- Agia Kyriaki
- Ampelia (Ampelia, Agios Panteleimonas, Rapi)
- Chrysavgi
- Elataria
- Grika
- Kallithea (Kallithea, Avaritsa, Vrysopoula)
- Karioti
- Karvounari (Karvounari, Kyra Panagia)
- Krystallopigi (Krystallopigi, Kefalovryso)
- Neochori (Neochori, Agios Georgios, Neraida)
- Pagkrates
- Paramythia (Paramythia, Agios Georgios, Agios Donatos)
- Pente Ekklisies
- Petousi
- Petrovitsa
- Plakoti
- Polydroso
- Prodromi (Prodromi, Dafnoula)
- Psaka (Psaka, Nounesati)
- Saloniki
- Sevasto
- Xirolofos (Xirolofos, Rachouli)
- Zervochori (Zervochori, Asfaka, Kamini)

== See also ==
- List of cities in ancient Epirus
- Axis-Cham Albanian collaboration
- Paramythia executions
- Paramythia Hoard
- Metropolis of Paramythia, Filiates, Giromeri and Parga

== Gallery ==
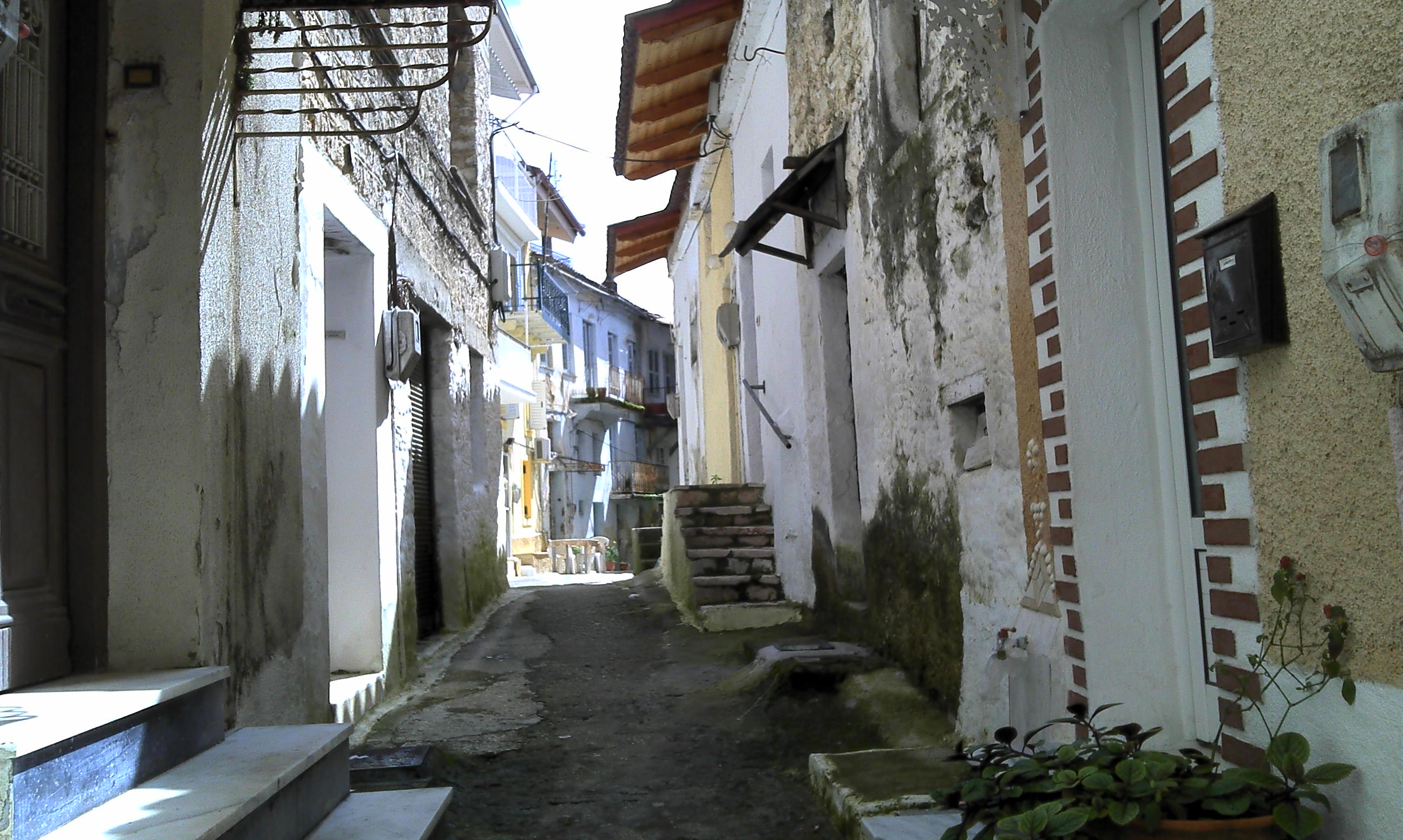
Old part of Paramythia

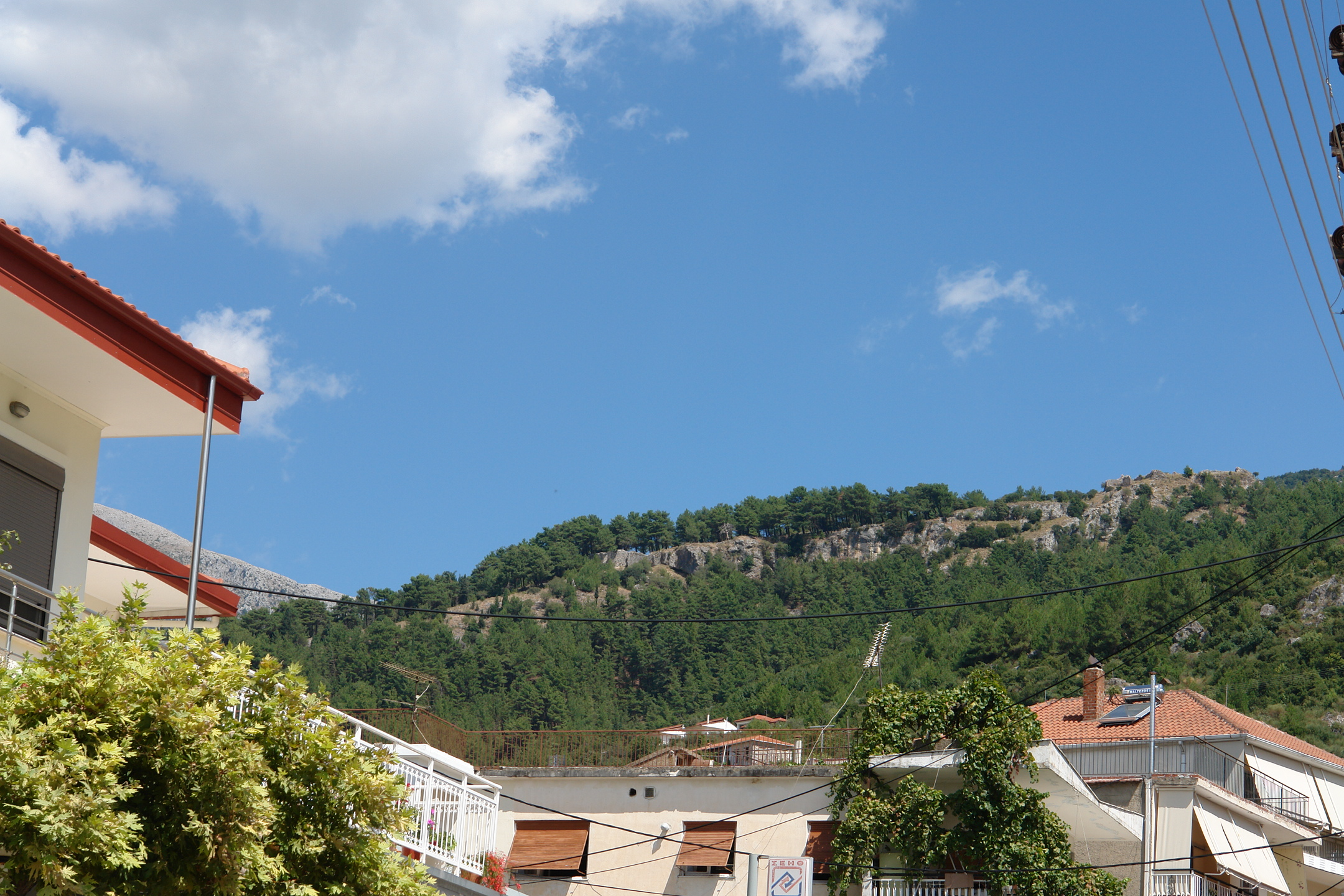
The Byzantine castle seen from the streets of Paramythia

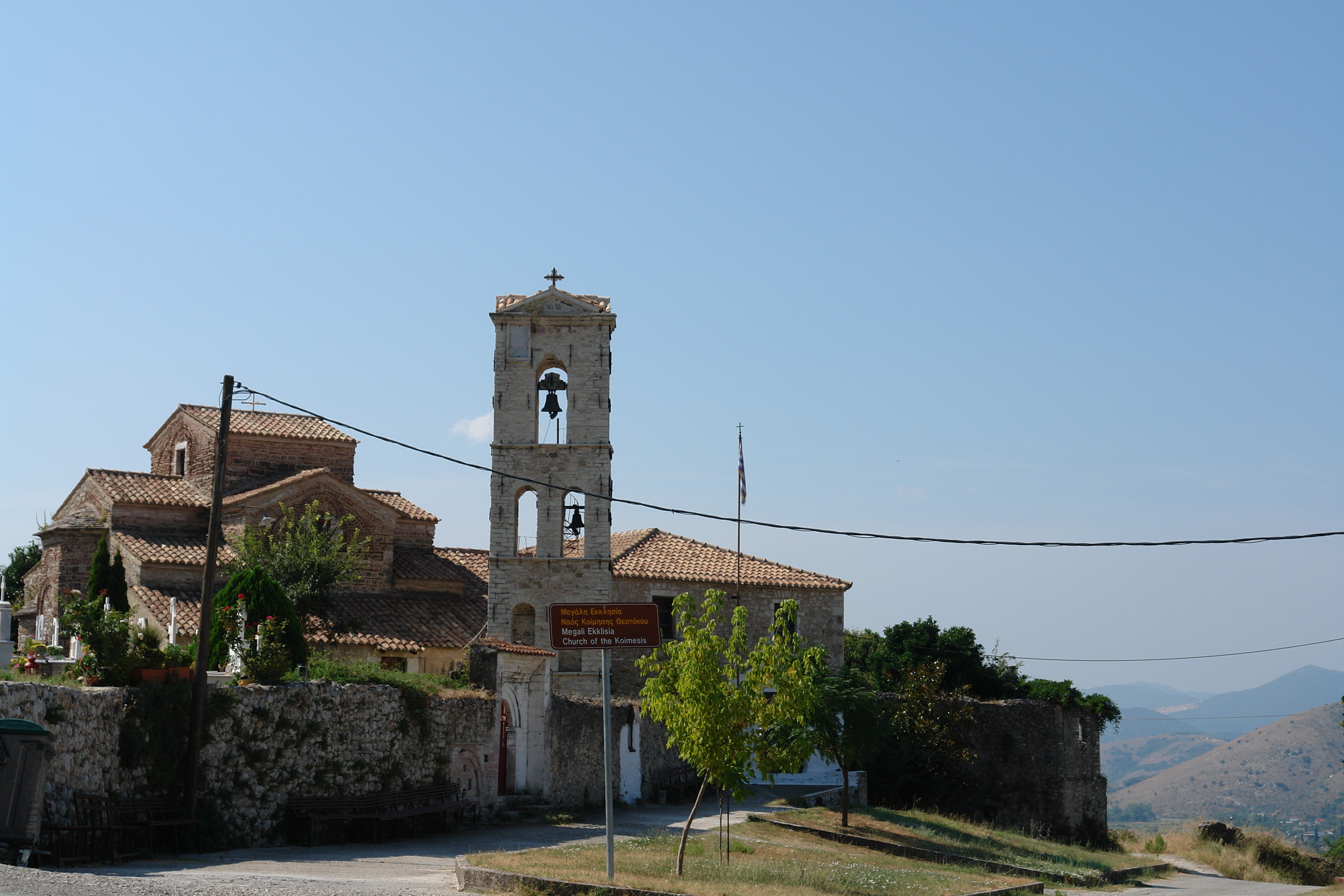
Byzantine church of the Koimesis (13th century AD)

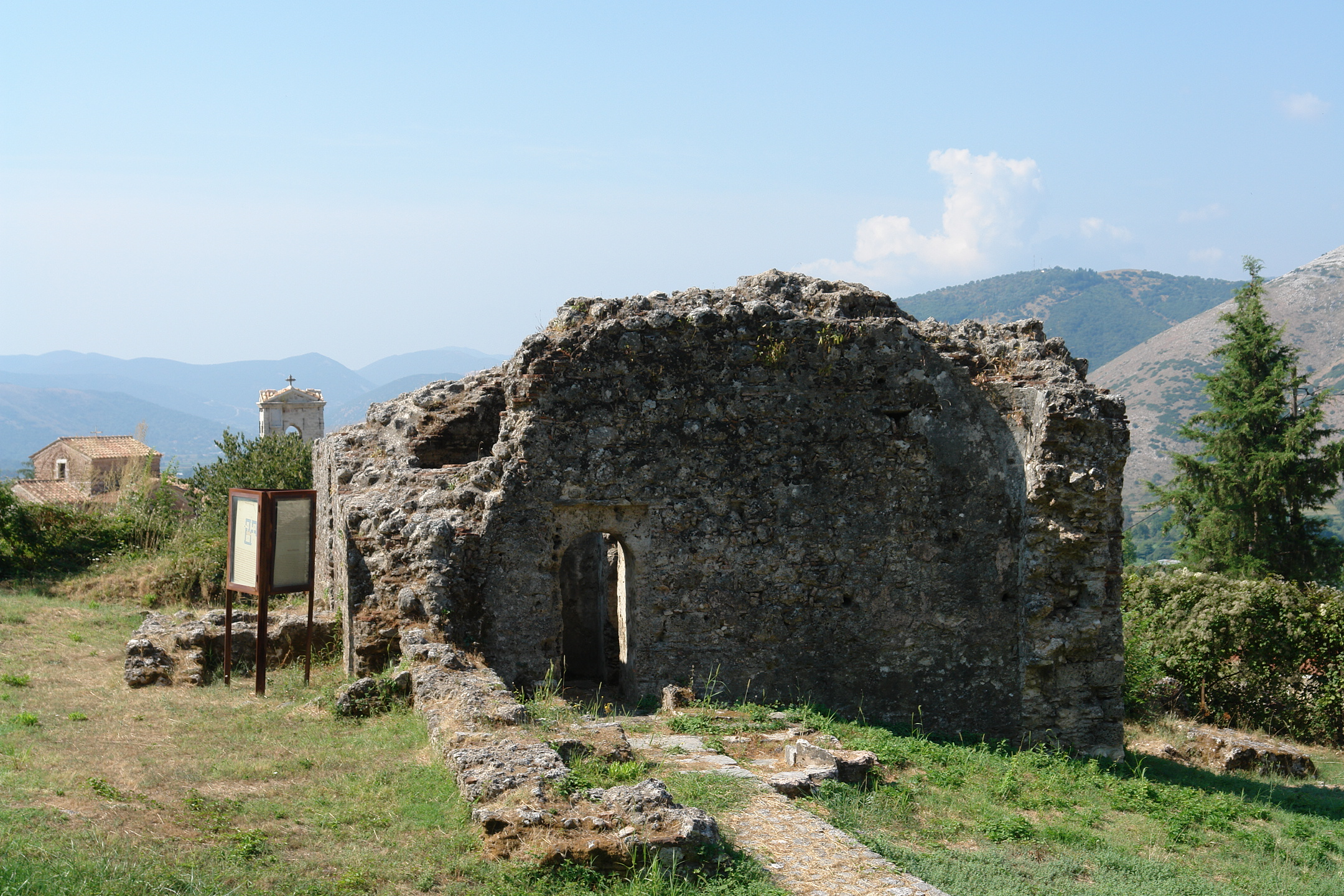
Byzantine baths of Paramythia (early 15th century AD)

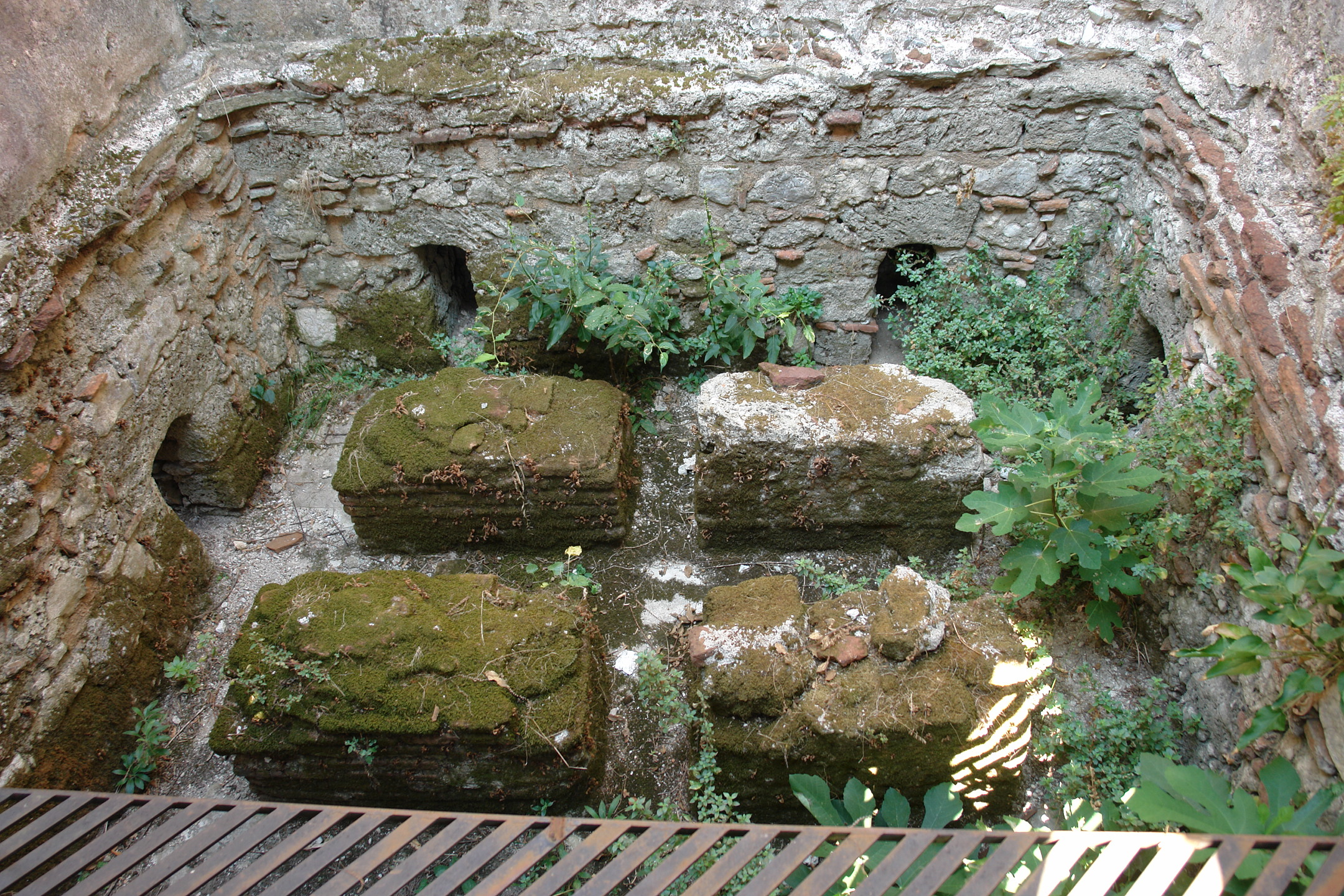
Interior of the Byzantine baths

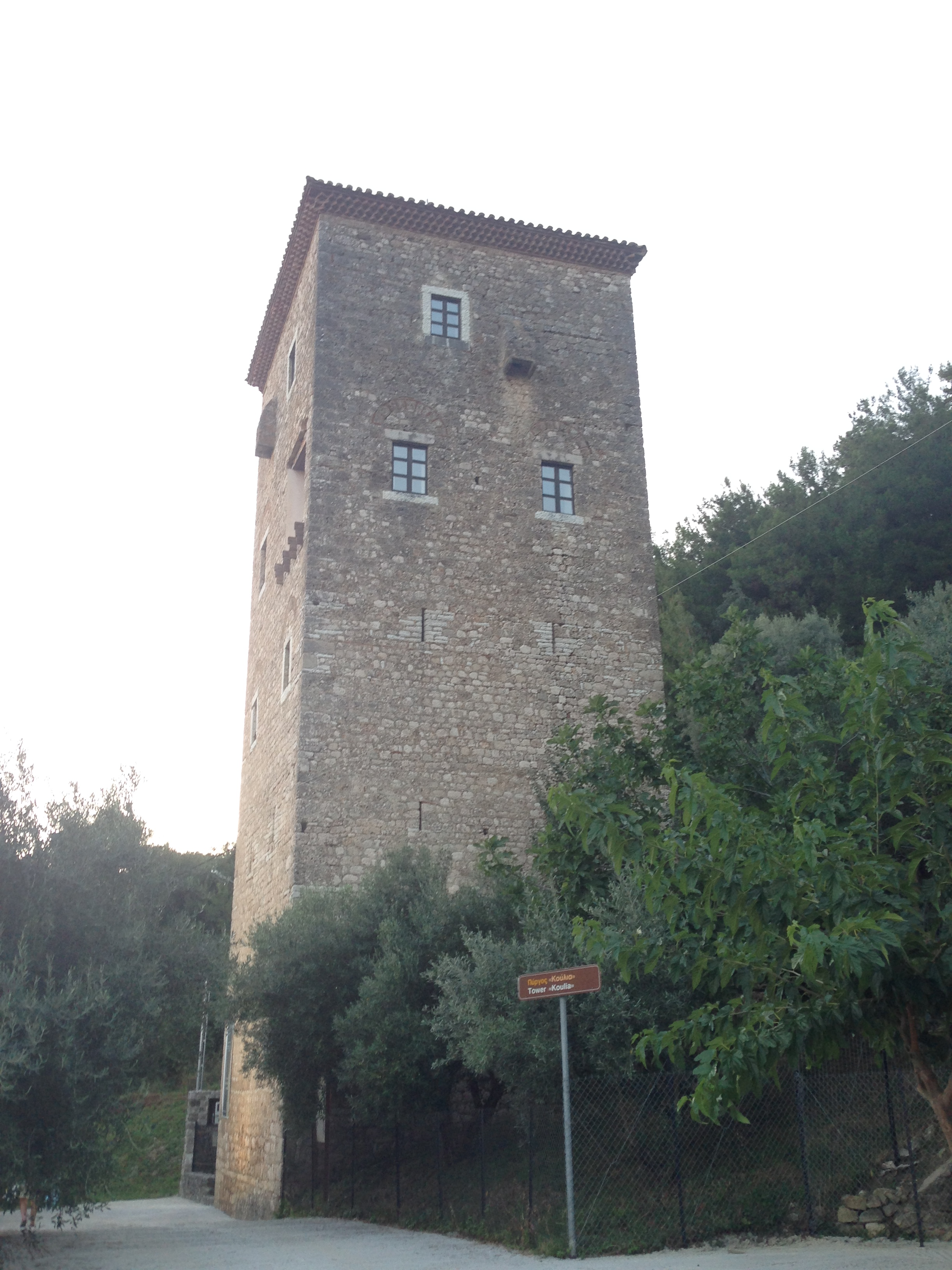
Ottoman tower (Koulia, 17th century AD)

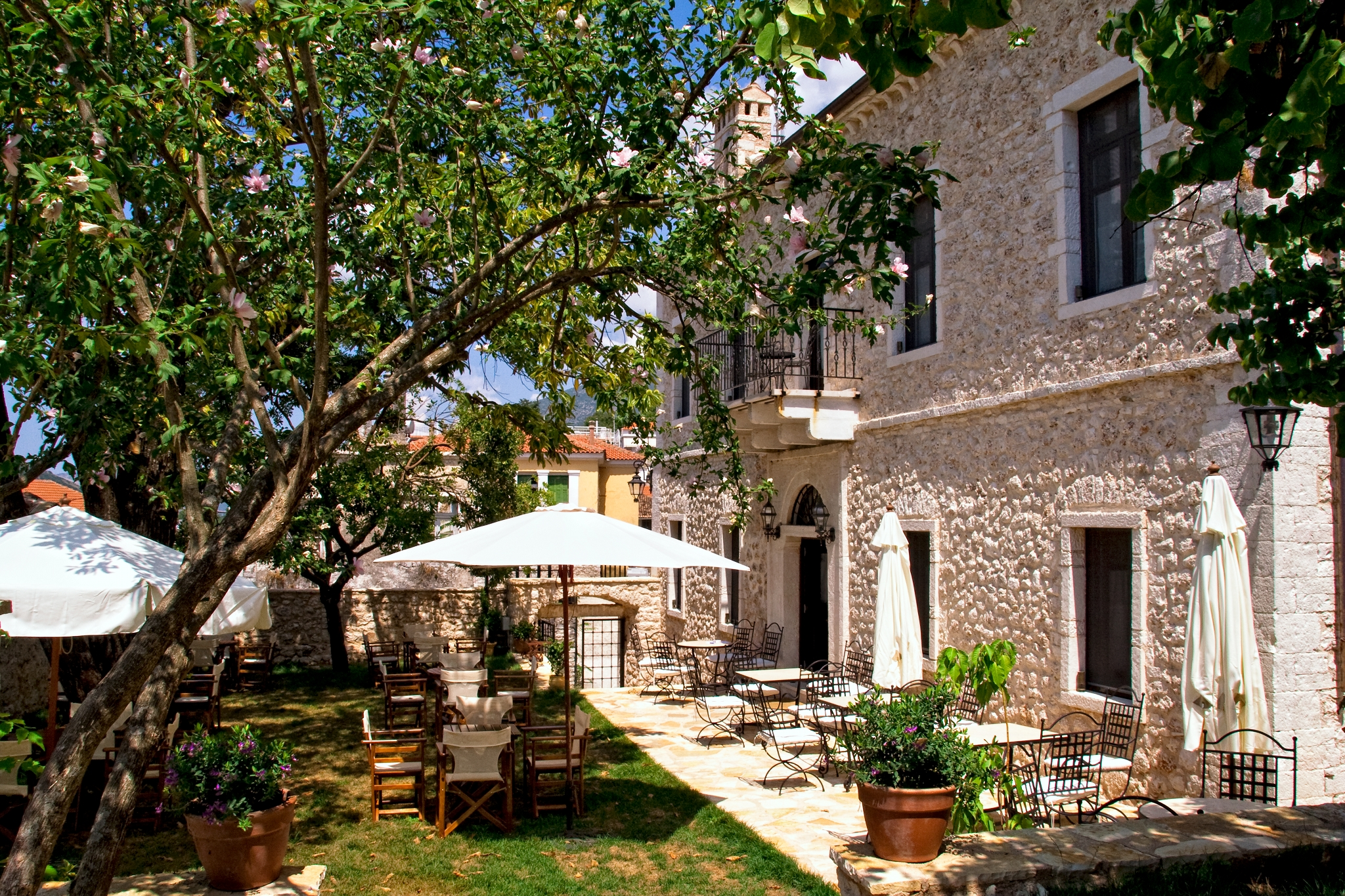
Rigas mansion (1872)

The marketplace of Paramythia (1915)

== Sources ==
- Balta, Evangelia; Oğuz, Mustafa; Yaşar, Filiz (2011). "Εthnic and Religious Composition of Ottoman Thesprotia in the 15th to 17th centuries". In Forsén, Björn; Tikkala, Esko (eds.). Thesprotia Expedition II. Environment and Settlement Patterns. Foundation of the Finnish Institute at Athens. ISBN 978-952-67211-2-5.
- Malcolm, Noel (2020). Rebels, Believers, Survivors: Studies in the History of the Albanians. Oxford University Press. ISBN 978-0192599223.
- Meyer, Hermann Frank (2008). Blutiges Edelweiß: Die 1. Gebirgs-division im zweiten Weltkrieg [Bloodstained Edelweiss. The 1st Mountain-Division in WWII] (in German). Ch. Links Verlag. ISBN 978-3-86153-447-1.
- Tsoutsoumpis, Spiros (2015). "Violence, resistance and collaboration in a Greek borderland: the case of the Muslim Chams of Epirus "Qualestoria" n. 2, dicembre 2015". Qualestoria. 2.
