= Neochori, Thesprotia =

Neochori Νεοχώρι
- Community
- Location within Greece
- Coordinates: 39°31′N 20°26′E
- Country: Greece
- Administrative region: Epirus
- Regional unit: Thesprotia
- Municipality: Souli
- Municipal unit: Paramythia

Population (2021)
  - Community: 421
- Time zone: UTC+2 (EET)
  - Summer (DST): UTC+3 (EEST)

Neochori (Greek: Νεοχώρι, Albanian: Nijhor) is a village and community in the municipal district Paramythia in the municipality of Souli, Epirus.

== History ==
Around the 17th century, Neochori was founded. Originally, half of the village was inhabited by Muslim Çamen. In 1944, after the Çamen left the village, some Sarakatsans and Aromanians migrated there. The Christian part of the population had to leave Neochori temporarily during the German occupation from 1941 to 1944, as part of the Balkan campaign.

The number of inhabitants in the community of Neochori amounts to 421 (2021).
