= Kastri, Thesprotia =

Kastri Καστρί
- Community
- Location within Greece
- Coordinates: 39°33′N 20°16′E
- Country: Greece
- Administrative region: Epirus
- Regional unit: Thesprotia
- Municipality: Igoumenitsa
- Municipal unit: Igoumenitsa

Population (2021)
  - Community: 664
- Time zone: UTC+2 (EET)
  - Summer (DST): UTC+3 (EEST)
- Vehicle registration: ΗΝ

Kastri (Greek: Καστρί or Καστρίον, Kastríon; Albanian: Kastriot) is a town in Thesprotia, Epirus, Greece. The local church is dedicated to Saint George.

Kastri is mainly inhabited by Greek residents, while the presence of an Orthodox Albanian-speaking community has been vivid throughout the past century. During the Axis occupation of Greece, 18 residents of Kastri were executed by German forces and local Cham Albanian collaborators.
