= Perdika =

Perdika Πέρδικα
- Municipal unit
- Location within the regional unit

- Location within Greece
- Coordinates: 39°22′N 20°18′E
- Country: Greece
- Administrative region: Epirus
- Regional unit: Thesprotia
- Municipality: Igoumenitsa

Area
  - Municipal unit: 34.6 km^{2} (13.4 sq mi)

Population (2021)
  - Municipal unit: 1,543
  - Municipal unit density: 44.6/km^{2} (116/sq mi)
- Time zone: UTC+2 (EET)
  - Summer (DST): UTC+3 (EEST)
- Vehicle registration: ΗΝ

Perdika (Greek: Πέρδικα) is a village and a former community in Thesprotia, Epirus, Greece. Since the 2011 local government reform it is part of the municipality Igoumenitsa, of which it is a municipal unit. The municipal unit has an area of 34.605 km^{2}.

Perdika is located 29 mi (47 km) southeast of Igoumenitsa. The town's population is 1,543, as of the 2021 population census. Primary aspects of the economy are agriculture and tourism.

== History ==
In 1927, the name of the village was changed from Arpitsa (Greek: Αρπίτσα; Albanian: Arpica) to Perdika. In 1944, the local Cham Albanians were expulsed.

== Notable people ==
- Hajredin Shabani (sq), Albanian folkorist and singer
