= Margariti =

Margariti Μαργαρίτι
- Municipal unit
- Location within the regional unit

- Location within Greece
- Coordinates: 39°22′N 20°25′E
- Country: Greece
- Administrative region: Epirus
- Regional unit: Thesprotia
- Municipality: Igoumenitsa

Area
  - Municipal unit: 149.2 km^{2} (57.6 sq mi)

Population (2021)
  - Municipal unit: 1,931
  - Municipal unit density: 12.94/km^{2} (33.52/sq mi)
  - Community: 586
- Time zone: UTC+2 (EET)
  - Summer (DST): UTC+3 (EEST)
- Vehicle registration: ΗΝ

Margariti (Greek: Μαργαρίτι) is a village and a former municipality in Thesprotia, Epirus, Greece. Since the 2011 local government reform it is part of the municipality Igoumenitsa, of which it is a municipal unit. The municipal unit has an area of 149.223 km^{2}. Population 1,931 (2021).

== Name ==
The toponym Margariti (Greek: Μαργαρίτι) is thought to come from Margaritos, a pirate of the Emirate of Sicily to whom the Crusader Normans surrendered their holdings on the Ionian coast in the 12th century. The toponym is of uncertain origin and is attested for the first time during the 16th century. In the Albanian language it is known as Margëlliç and in Ottoman Turkish as Margliç. This form is attested since 1611, when Gjon Mekuli from Parga reports to the Venetians that Marghelici had been affected by the plague. Historical documents tend to use the form Margariti.

Margariti was not used as the name of the area for most of its existence. The settlements and the region were known as the nahiye/kaza of Mazarak, the name of a village 6km to the south of modern Margariti. Mazarak was the central settlement of the Albanian Mazreku clan, which provided the guard of the citadel of Margariti. Until the 19th century, the region was known as the kaza of Mazarak in Ottoman records. Marglic/Margariti appears as the common name of the kaza/nahiye as early as the salname 1865.

== History ==
Various ancient sites have been located in the vicinity of the modern settlement. There is a possibility that Margariti was founded before the 16th century.

=== Early Ottoman Period ===
The Ottoman defter of 1530 that was based on the information of a register made under Selim I in 1519-1520 is the first source to mention the hamlet of “Margarit”, which had only 8 Christian households; the neighbouring villages were also devoid of Muslims. The Ottoman fort in the settlement was built in the first half of the 16th century. Margariti was the administrative center of the nahiye of Mazaraki which in 1551 was renamed to Margariti. The name refers to the Albanian Mazreku tribe which lived in the region and who, via their military services, founded the core of Margariti.

The nahiye had 38 and 35 villages in 1551 and 1613 respectively whereas the settlement of Margariti itself had 17 and 20 households in 1551 and 1613 respectively. It was located on the Venetian-Ottoman borderlands of the time. The locals of the areas of Paramythia, Parakalamos and Margariti were specifically harassed by the Venetians and the inhabitants of Venetian Corfu in violation of the Ottoman-Venetian treaty of 1540. In the register of 1551, 17 names were recorded as being inhabitants of Margariti, 14 of which were household heads and 3 bachelors. The anthroponyms recorded were almost exclusively Albanian in character: Duka Bruni; Spani Deda; Gjon Ilia; Qesar Dhima; Menksh Leka; Tupe (Popa) Todri; Gjin Jorga; Popa Brushi; Gjin Gjoni; Gjon Jani; Andria Qesari; Gjin Popa (Tope); Jani Nika; Papa Mihali; Gjon Shorri; Gjon Nika. The defter of 1551 enumerates the members of the garrison of the “castle of Margaliç” with a castle commander (Dizdar) and 17 soldiers. Their pay was covered by the tax revenue of a group of villages in the district of Margariti.

In 1570, the Venetian commander Girolamo Zane unsuccessfully attacked the fort of Margariti. In 1571, a group of Albanians from Margariti travelled to Corfu and asked for assistance to take the fort of Margariti from the Ottomans. The Venetian governor of Corfu initially assessed that the force of the group was too small (200-250 men) for the attack. After the Battle of Lepanto, crucial support was provided by armed units during the second siege of Margariti (November 10–14, 1571); revolutionary leader Petros Lantzas became a key figure by organizing the military movements and securing the cooperation of the population in the surrounding region.

A larger force of 6,000 Venetians and Corfiots, which also included local groups from Parga and Paramythia, assembled under the Venetian commander Sebastiano Venier and attacked the fort of Margariti, which was seized and burnt after a four-day siege. The fall of Margariti had a profound impact in the Christian states of the West as well as among the Greek population of Epirus that lived under Ottoman rule. Venice commissioned a painting for the Doge's Palace to commemorate the destruction of the fort of Margariti. This was one of the final Venetian incursions in Ottoman territory and in the following decades, the region stopped being a battleground district.

After the conclusion of peace between the Ottomans and the Venetians on 7 March 1573, Margariti remained in the possession of the Ottomans. The Cham Albanians who had escaped returned and rebuilt the castle. The Ottoman defter of 1583 shows that Margaliç had only slightly grown, as the number of households increased to only 10 with another 10 unmarried adult males in the settlement. The household heads had Albanian names such as Gjin, Gjon and Duka, although there were three priests with Greek Orthodox names and one recent Muslim convert. Each household paid around 100 Akçe as tax annually, which is the common average for villages situated on arable land that were not very productive.

Local Muslim converts appear in Margariti as early as the 16th century. It is noted that the conversion to Islam of the guard of Margariti, which came from the local medieval Albanian Mazaraki clan, must have been finalized before 1571. A century later, in 1670, when Evliya Çelebi passed through Margariti, he noted that there were 200 houses within the citadel and another 1,200 were located in the town which had developed around it. At this time, the town of Margariti, which was split into seven neighbourhoods and had a population of 5,000-6,000 inhabitants, had mainly converted to Islam. Çelebi recorded two Friday mosques with stone minarets and tile-covered roofs in the town, but no churches. He also recorded seven masjids divided across the neighbourhoods that did not hold Friday services and functioned as prayer rooms. Additionally, two primary schools (mektep), a hamam, two caravanserais, two tekkes and a number of shops were recorded; a madrasa was constructed in the town at some point during the 1670s following Evliya's visit. The position of Margariti at the Venetian-Ottoman border was a cause of friction as the interests of the Venetians and the Albanian beys of Margariti resulted in disputes for the control of the agricultural territory between Parga and the inland territory. Evliya's visit occurred during the last years of the Cretan War, when there was a constant threat of Venetian attack. An Ottoman budget record of 1669/70 shows that the small castle of Margariti had eight gunners, and an estimated 40-50 Janissaries.

=== Late Ottoman period ===
The local Albanian Çapari family emerged in this era. By the end of the 18th century, Hasan Çapari, the leading figure of the family, owned the entire plain of Fanari (to the south of Margariti). Cham Albanian landlords of Margariti and Paramythia were in conflict with Ali Pasha of Yannina during much of the existence of the Pashalik of Yanina. After Ali occupied the town in 1811 following a stubborn resistance led by Hasan Aga of Margariti, the settlement lost much of its prosperity. During the Tanzimat reforms of 1861, Margariti once again became the centre of a Kaza in the Sanjak of Preveza. Representatives from Margariti were part of the southern branch of the League of Prizren.

In 1880, Muslim Albanians constituted 82% of Margariti's population with a total of 1,100 inhabitants; the remainder consisted of 240 Christians. The Kaza of Margariti itself numbered to 48 villages with 3,813 Christians and 15,202 Muslims, making the Kaza 80% Muslim. In 1898, Sami Frasheri describes Margariti as a town with about 3,000 Muslim Albanian inhabitants, although this figure is slightly exaggerated. During this time, the Kaza of Margariti, which included the nahiyes of Margariti (largely coterminous to the modern municipality), Parga and Fanari included 71 villages with a total of 25,000 inhabitants, all of which spoke Albanian and most of which were Muslim.

=== 20th century ===
Margariti was represented as part of the delegation of Chameria by prominent local figure Jakup Veseli when Albania declared its independence in 1912. Some Albanian beys of Margariti were willing to accept Greek rule during the Balkan Wars. In February 1913, Margariti was taken by the Greek army and incorporated into Greece following the Treaty of London (May 1913). Margariti was one of the most severely damaged Cham settlements by Greek militia. Following the annexation of Margariti there was a decrease of its population of Muslim Albanians. From 1913 to 1920, its population dropped from 2606 to 1803. During that period all village elders of the region gathered and declared that they would resist the incorporation of the area into Greece.

According to the Greek census of 1928, the town of Margariti had dropped to 1,805 inhabitants of which 200 were Greeks, who had increased as part of the gradual Hellenization of Albanian-majority towns in the area in the 1920s. According to the Greek census of 1928, the Eparchy of Margariti (including Margariti, Parga, Fanari, Perdika) had 14,531 inhabitants of which only 5,000 were Muslim Chams.

During the interwar period, Margariti was among the most important towns of the Cham Albanian community located in the coastal region of the Greek part of Chameria and it functioned as a centre of the Albanian speaking area. The region witnessed the largest level of participation to the National Youth Organisation of Ioannis Metaxas in Thesprotia.

At the beginning of the Axis occupation during World War II, when the town was occupied by Fascist Italian troops in 1941, armed Cham Albanian groups under J. Sadik committed a number of massacres and lootings. Almost all Cham Albanian monuments of Margariti were destroyed during World War II, and during the end of the war, most Muslim families of the region were relocated north of Ioannina under Nazi German instructions. The region of Margariti together with Mazaraki, was among the first to produce resistance units in Thesprotia in order to deal with the activity of Muslim Cham Albanian groups.

At the end of World War II, the presence of Albanian Islam in Chameria was annihilated; Chams were expelled from the town by ELAS forces. Those who could save themselves fled to Albania, whereas mosques, tekkes and other buildings reminiscent of the Islamic period were torn down, blown up or set on fire. The town and many of the surviving villages were largely deserted. According to the Greek census of 1960, Margariti had 982 inhabitants. The town and its 48 villages together had a total population of 6,464, which is two thirds less than the figure mentioned by the Greek report in 1880. Many ruins, such as minarets, houses and mosques, can be found throughout Margariti and the surrounding villages as a reminder of the expulsion of the Cham Albanians from the region. The ruins of the castle of Margariti can be found on the southern edge of the modern town. Despite the restoration efforts on Ottoman monuments elsewhere in Greece, nothing has been done to restore the many monuments in Margariti which once functioned as the core district of Chameria.

== Province ==
The province of Margariti (Greek: Επαρχία Μαργαριτίου) was one of the provinces of the Thesprotia Prefecture. Its territory corresponded with that of the current municipal units Margariti and Perdika. It was abolished in 2006.

== Notable residents ==
- Hamdi Çami, Albanian deputy of Preveza in the Ottoman Parliament
- Jakup Veseli, representative of Chameria in Vlora Congress, signatory of Albanian Declaration of Independence.
- Konstantinos Zakas (1916–1986) Greek Army General.

== See also ==
- Population exchange between Greece and Turkey

== Sources ==
- Baltsiotis, Lambros (2009). The Muslim Chams from their entry into the Greek state until the start of the Greco-Italian war (1913-1940): the story of a community from millet to nation [Οι μουσουλμάνοι Τσάμηδες από την είσοδό τους στο ελληνικό κράτος μέχρι την έναρξη του ελληνοϊταλικού πολέμου (1913-1940): η ιστορία μιας κοινότητας από το millet στο έθνος] (Thesis). University of Panteion.
- Balta, Evangelia; Oğuz, Mustafa; Yaşar, Filiz (2011). "Εthnic and Religious Composition of Ottoman Thesprotia in the 15th to 17th centuries". In Forsén, Björn; Tikkala, Esko (eds.). Thesprotia Expedition II. Environment and Settlement Patterns. Foundation of the Finnish Institute at Athens. ISBN 978-952-67211-2-5.
- Pitouli-Kitsou, Hristina (1997). Οι Ελληνοαλβανικές Σχέσεις και το βορειοηπειρωτικό ζήτημα κατά περίοδο 1907–1914 (Thesis). National and Kapodistrian University of Athens.
- Kokolakis, Mihalis (2003). Το ύστερο Γιαννιώτικο Πασαλίκι: χώρος, διοίκηση και πληθυσμός στην τουρκοκρατούμενη Ηπειρο (1820–1913) [The Late Pashalik of Ioannina: Space, Administration and Population in Ottoman-ruled Epirus (1820–1913)] (in Greek). Athens, Greece: EIE-ΚΝΕ. ISBN 978-960-7916-11-2.
- Malcolm, Noel (2020). Rebels, Believers, Survivors: Studies in the History of the Albanians. Oxford University Press. ISBN 978-0192599223.
- Malcolm, Noel (2015). Agents of Empire: Knights, Corsairs, Jesuits and Spies in the Sixteenth-century Mediterranean World. Oxford University Press. ISBN 978-0190262785.
- Tsoutsoumpis, Spyros (2015). "Violence, resistance and collaboration in a Greek borderland: the case of the Muslim Chams of Epirus". Qualestoria. 43 (2). ISSN 0393-6082.
- Ψιμούλη, Βάσω Δ. (2006). Σούλι και Σουλιώτες. Ιστορία και Πολιτική (4th ed.). Athens: Βιβλιοπωλείον της Εστίας.
  - Psimuli, Vaso Dh. (2016). Suli dhe suljotët [Souli and the Souliots]. Toena. ISBN 9789928205728.
