= Grika =

Village in Greece

Grika Γκρίκα
- Community
- Location within Greece
- Coordinates: 39°27′57″N 20°25′33″E
- Country: Greece
- Administrative region: Epirus
- Regional unit: Thesprotia
- Municipality: Souli
- Elevation: 398 m (1,306 ft)

Population
  - Community: 262
- Time zone: UTC+2 (EET)
  - Summer (DST): UTC+3 (EEST)

Grika (Greek: Γκρίκα) is a village in Greece.

== Location ==
It is located in the prefecture of Thesprotia and the region of Epirus, in the western part of the country, 300 km northwest of the capital Athens. Grika is situated 398 meters above sea level and has a population of 262.

== Climate ==
A Mediterranean climate prevails in the area. The average annual temperature in the area is 15 °C. The hottest month is July, with an average temperature of 27 °C, and the coldest is January, with 4 °C. The average annual rainfall is 1,463 millimeters. The wettest month is December, with an average of 223 mm of precipitation, and the driest is August, with 8 mm of precipitation.
