= Graikochori =

Village in Thesprotia, Greece

Graikochori Γραικοχώρι
- Community
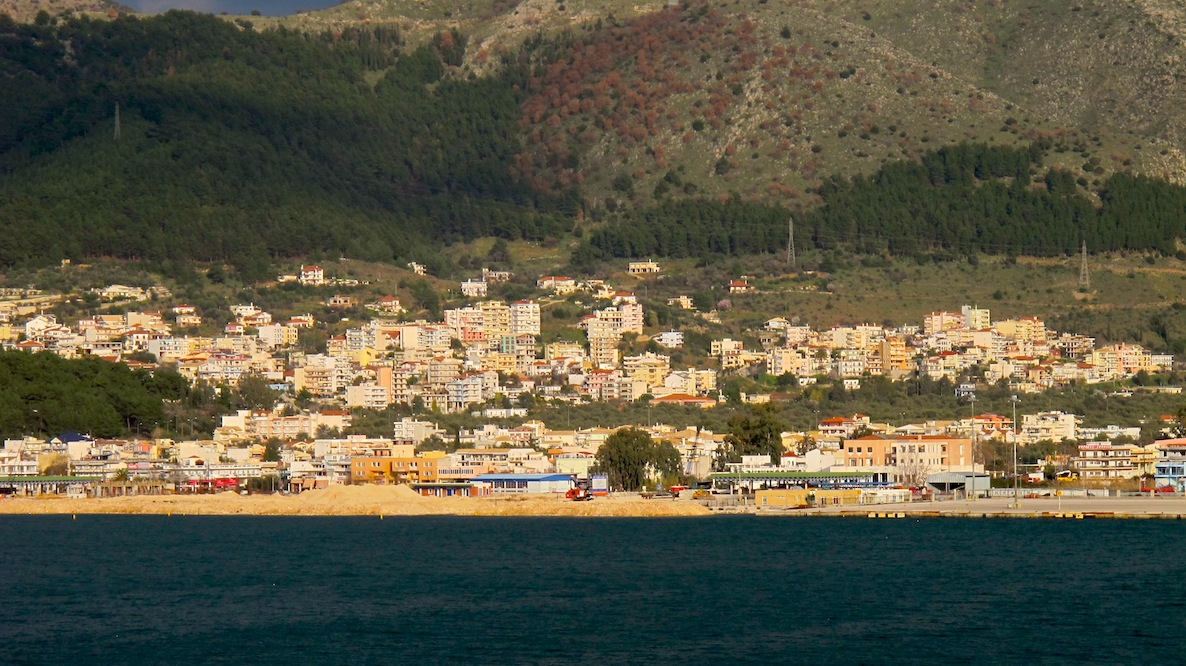
- View of Graikochori

- Location within Greece
- Coordinates: 39°29′52″N 20°16′30″E
- Country: Greece
- Administrative region: Epirus
- Regional unit: Thesprotia
- Municipality: Igoumenitsa
- Municipal unit: Igoumenitsa

Population (2021)
  - Community: 2,393
- Time zone: UTC+2 (EET)
  - Summer (DST): UTC+3 (EEST)

Graikochori (Greek: Γραικοχώρι) is a village and a community in the regional unit of Thesprotia in Epirus, Greece. It is within the Igoumenitsa municipality. In the 2021 census the community had a population of 2,393 inhabitants.
