= Igoumenitsa =

City in Thesprotia, Greece

Igoumenitsa Ηγουμενίτσα
- Municipality
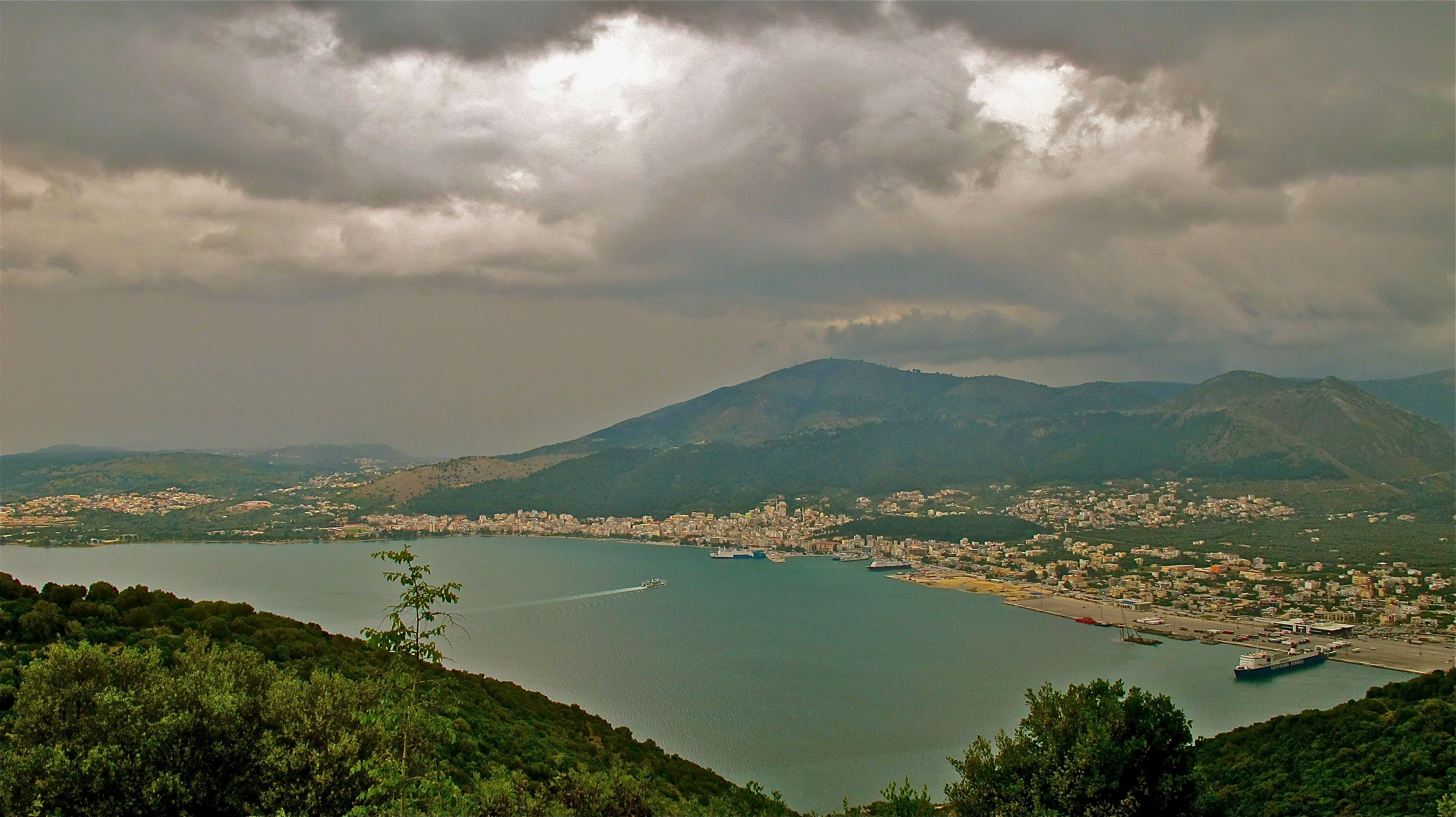
- Igoumenitsa

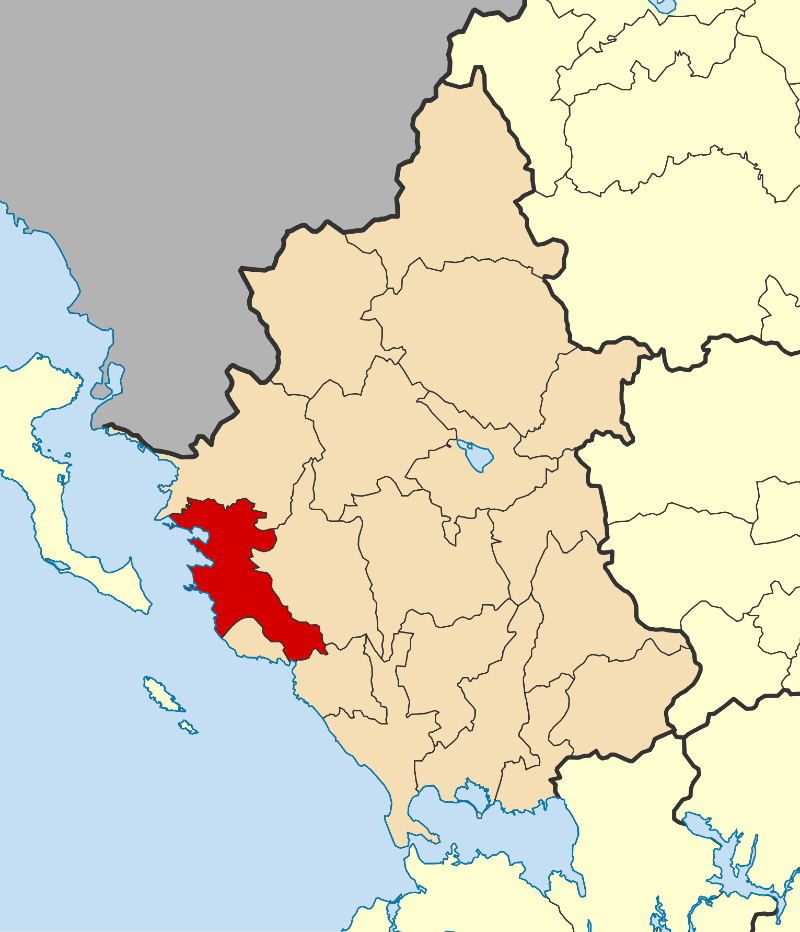

- Location within Greece
- Coordinates: 39°29′N 20°16′E
- Country: Greece
- Administrative region: Epirus
- Regional unit: Thesprotia

Government
  - Mayor: Panagiotis Ntais (since 2023)

Area
  - Municipality: 428.4 km^{2} (165.4 sq mi)
  - Municipal unit: 111.8 km^{2} (43.2 sq mi)
- Elevation: 13 m (43 ft)

Population (2021)
  - Municipality: 25,698
  - Density: 59.99/km^{2} (155.4/sq mi)
  - Municipal unit: 18,562
  - Municipal unit density: 166.0/km^{2} (430.0/sq mi)
  - Community: 10,315
- Demonym: Igoumenitsiote
- Time zone: UTC+2 (EET)
  - Summer (DST): UTC+3 (EEST)
- Postal code: 461 00
- Area code: 26650
- Vehicle registration: ΗΝ
- Website: www.igoumenitsa.gr

Igoumenitsa (Greek: Ηγουμενίτσα, romanized: Igoumenítsa) is a coastal city in northwestern Greece. It is the capital of the regional unit of Thesprotia.

Igoumenitsa is the chief port of Thesprotia and Epirus, and one of the largest passenger ports of Greece, connecting northwestern Mainland Greece with the Ionian Islands and Italy. The city is built on the easternmost end of the Gulf of Igoumenitsa in the Ionian Sea and primary aspects of the economy are maritime, transport, services, agriculture and tourism. The 670 km (420 mi) long A2 motorway (Egnatia Odos), which serves northern Greece, terminates at Igoumenitsa, making it a popular starting point for tourists coming from Europe and ending point for trucks from Turkey.

Igoumenitsa features many shops, schools, offices and cargo storages, a university department, a library, an archeological museum, several sport stadiums and tennis courses, a courthouse and a medical clinic. The Thesprotia Police Headquarters and the Municipal Sailing Club are located here. The city itself is built on the slopes of a forested mountain and expands perimetrically around the gulf.

The 2021 census recorded 25,698 inhabitants for the wider Municipality, of which 18,562 in the municipal unit of Igoumenitsa, and 10,315 in the town proper. Igoumenitsa is known for being surrounded by several forests and for its blue waters. The nearby Drepanos Beach is one of the longest sand beaches in the region, with a length of over 7 kilometers.

== Names ==
Igoumenitsa is known by various names in different time periods. During the medieval era it was mentioned in a golden bull by Simeon Uroš (1361). At a 15th century Greek portolan chart it was mentioned as Igoumenitza (Greek: Ηγουμενίτζα). Later in Ottoman times, it was known as Grava (Greek: Γράβα). or Reşadiye. In 1938, after it became the capital city of the prefecture of Thesprotia, its name was changed to the current Igoumenitsa. The name is a derivation from the Greek word Igoumeni which means "commander; abbot". The name has been adopted as Gomenizza in Italian and as Gumenicë in Albanian.

== History ==
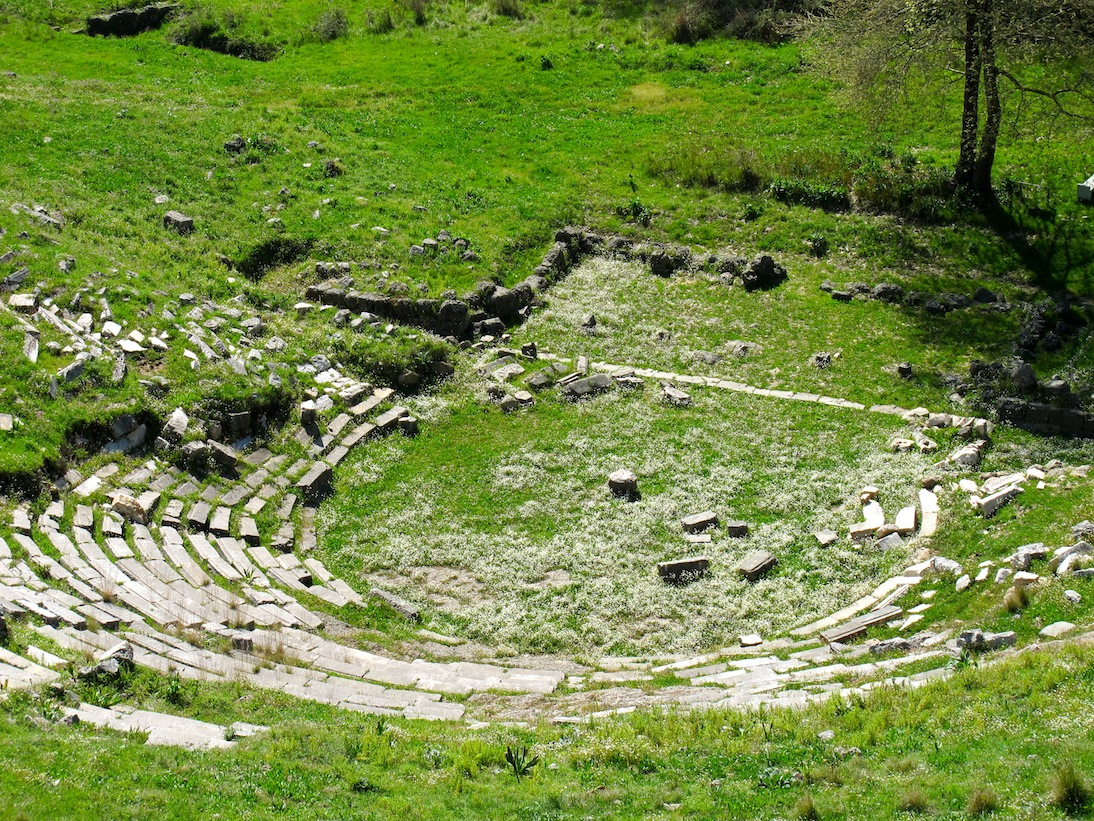
The ancient theatre of Titana (Gítana)

In ancient times, near Igoumenitsa, was the town of Gitanae (also known as Titana), and was one of the most important towns of the Kingdom of Thesprotis during the 4th century BC, covering 28 hectares. The circumference of its walls was 2,400 metres. The walls had four gates. Internal walls, in the shape of a sickle, divided the city in half. Its most noteworthy tower, located at the top of the hill, was round, and is thought to have been a religious sanctuary. Excavations have revealed a theatre which seats 2,500 and ruins of two temples.

Gitanae was a meeting place of the Epirote League (Livy 42.38.1). A spur near Philiates between the Kalamas River, the acropolis had a fine semicircular tower. A small theater, towers, and gateways which are still visible. The Kalamas may have been navigable to this point. The city was destroyed by the Romans in 167 BC and later on it was annexed into the Roman Empire. It was ruled by Ottoman Empire and was renamed as "Reşadiye" in 1909 in honour of Mehmet V, Ottoman Sultan between 1909 and 1918. During Italo-Turkish War, Hamidiye torpedo boat was sunk by an Italian destroyer on December 30, 1912 in here.

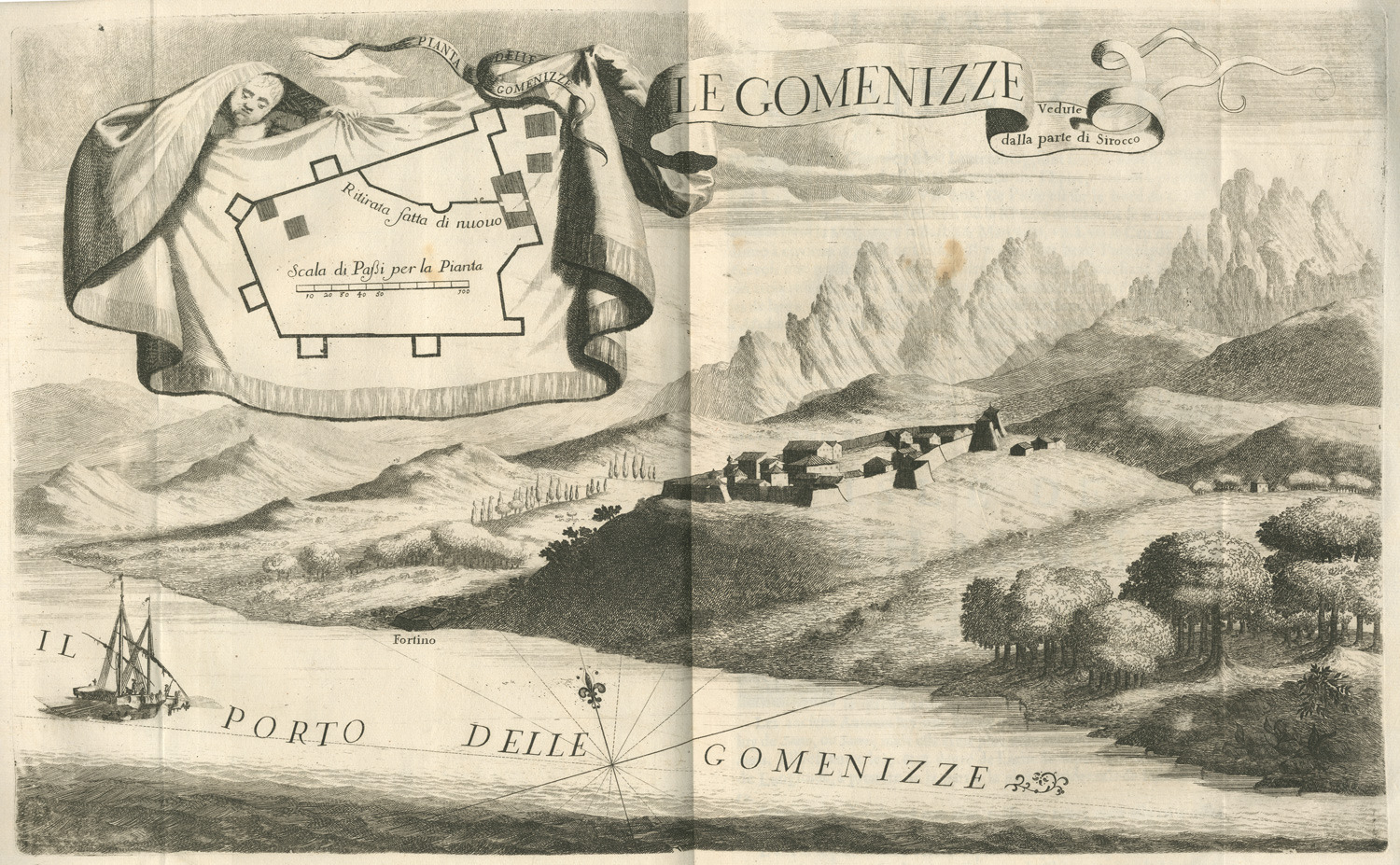
"Gomenizze" by Vincenzo Coronelli (1687)

After the liberation of the region from Ottoman rule during the Balkan Wars in 1913, the city name was Grava, a name that stayed in use until 1938, when the town became head of the prefecture of Thesprotia and was then renamed to Igoumenitsa. The town was destroyed in 1944 during the Axis occupation of Greece and a new settlement grew up around the new ferry terminal in the 1950s and 1960s.

Igoumenitsa was burnt by the Italian Fascist army in November 1940. After the creation of the pro-Axis Cham Albanian organisation (Këshilla) in mid-1942 violence was accelerated and on February 19, 1942, a group of Cham Albanians militias murdered Giorgos Vasilakos, head of the prefecture of Thesprotia in Igoumenitsa. On 30 September 1943, a representative of the International Red Cross, having visited the city, recorded that the Greek population was expelled from Igoumenitsa and its population had to find refuge to the mountains. Following World War II, the Muslim Cham Albanian residents of Igoumenitsa were expelled after parts of them collaborated with the invading German forces. They were relocated further north under instructions by the German Wehrmacht. The Cham-dialect of the Albanian language is still spoken by a minority of inhabitants in the town and the surrounding area.

== Municipality ==
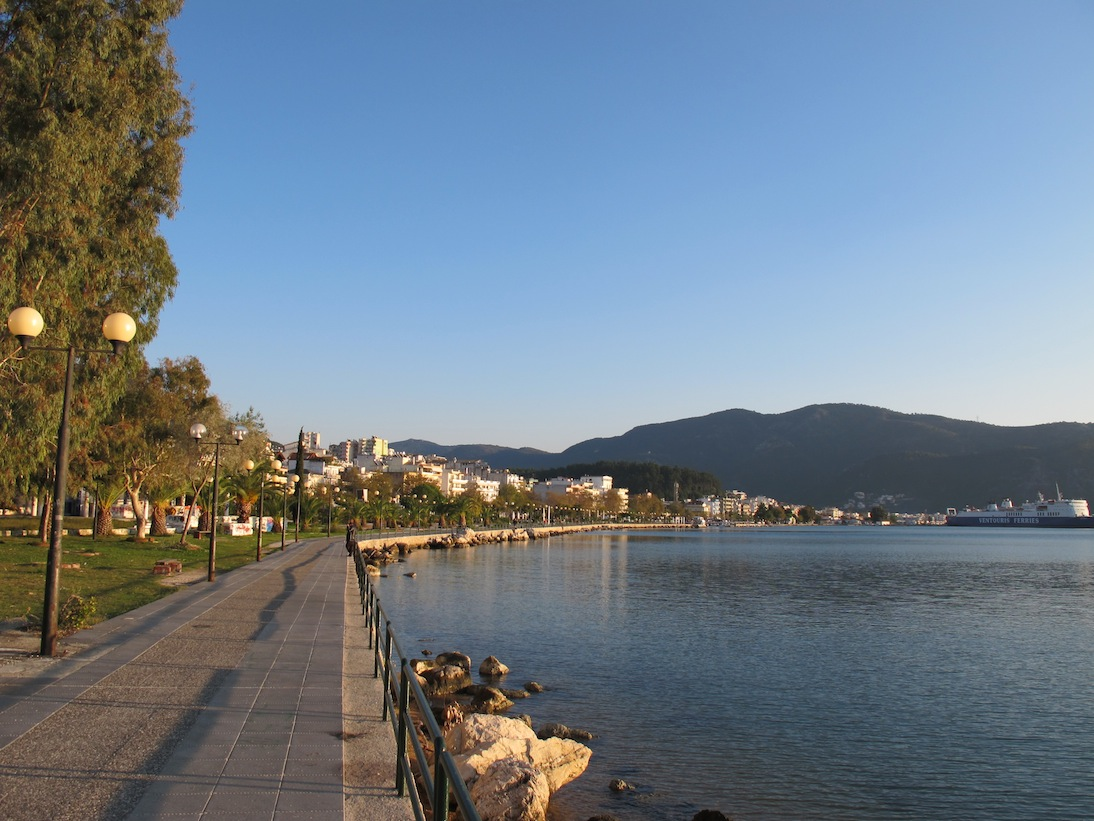
The promenade.

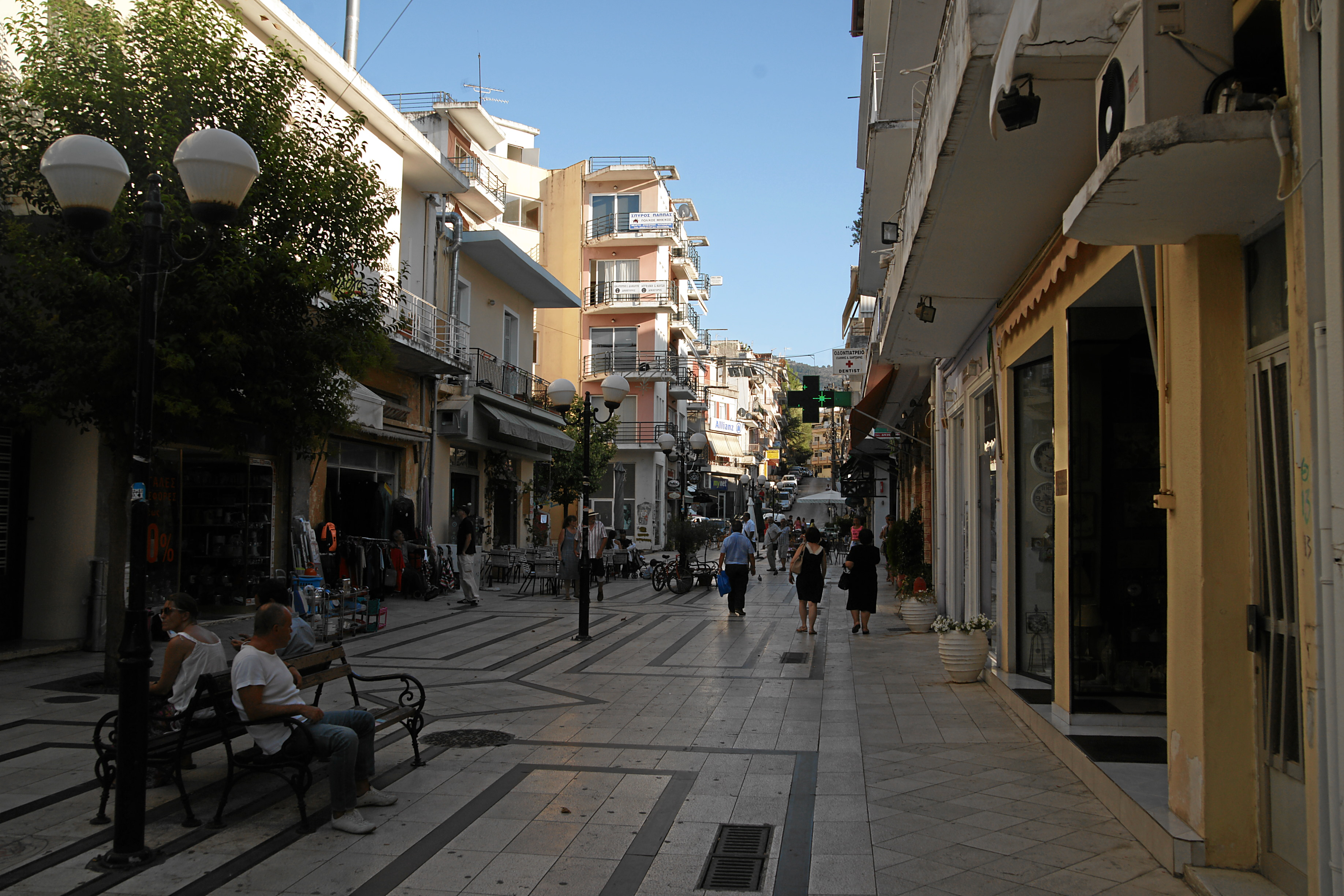
A street

The present municipality Igoumenitsa was formed at the 2011 local government reform by the merger of the following 5 former municipalities, that became municipal units (constituent communities in brackets):

- Igoumenitsa (Agia Marina, Agios Vlasios, Graikochori, Igoumenitsa, Kastri, Kryovrysi, Ladochori, Mavroudi, Nea Selefkeia)
- Margariti (Eleftheri, Karteri, Katavothra, Margariti, Mazarakia, Mesovouni, Spatharaioi)
- Parapotamos (Drimitsa, Geroplatanos, Koritiani, Parapotamos)
- Perdika
- Syvota (Argyrotopos, Faskomilia, Plataria, Syvota)

The municipality has an area of 428.353 km^{2}, the municipal unit 111.752 km^{2}.

== Transport ==
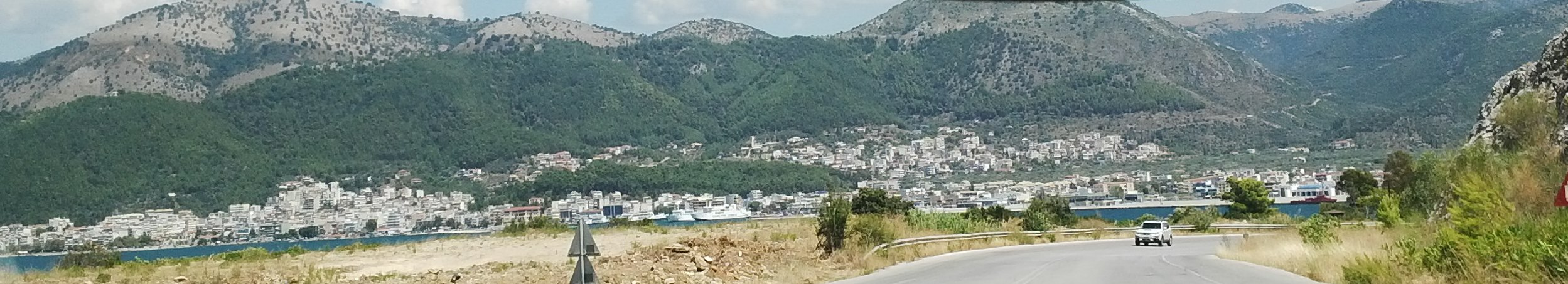
Igoumenitsa and the modern Egnatia motorway, as seen from the southern state road connecting Igoumenitsa with the village of Plataria.

The Patras, Greece to Brindisi, Italy car–ferry ships of the Hellenic Mediterranean Lines (HML) stop at Igoumenitsa, before crossing the Adriatic Sea and vice versa, as well as the ships of Superfast Ferries, ANEK Lines and several other shipping companies, before going to Ancona, Bari or Venice in Italy, and vice versa. Frequent passenger and car ferries sail to and from Corfu.

The A2 motorway, which was opened in 2009 and is part of the, has significantly enhanced the connection with Thessaloniki and Turkey and shortened the required travelling time from and to the Turkish border by several hours. Between Thessaloniki and the Turkish border, the road runs more or less parallel to the ancient Roman Via Egnatia.

=== Ports ===
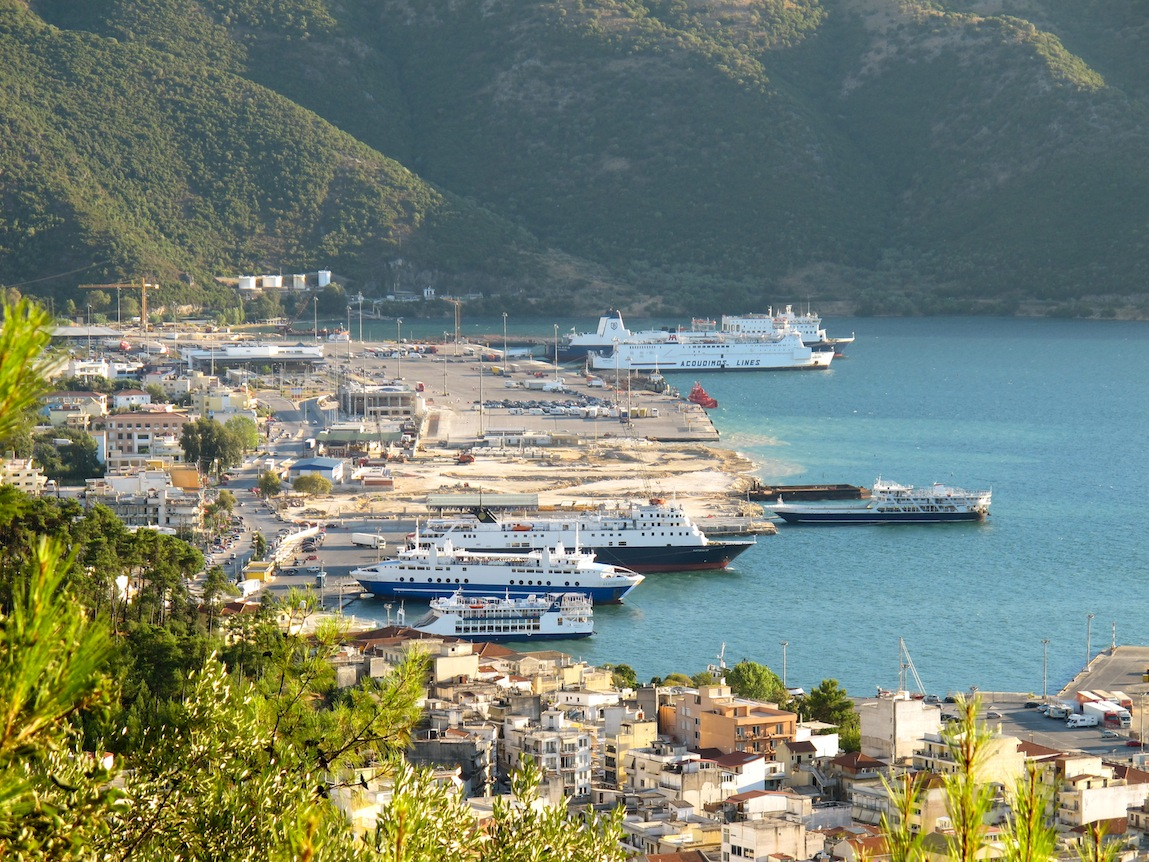
The new port of Igoumenitsa

Igoumenitsa features two ports. The Old Port and the New Port, which is the second busiest passenger port of Greece, after Piraeus, even surpassing the Ports of Iraklion and Patras which are now the third and fourth largest in the country.

The sea-lines going to and coming from Igoumenitsa are:

Internal Maritime Traffic

- Igoumenitsa – Corfu
- Igoumenitsa – Lefkimi
- Igoumenitsa – Paxoi
- Igoumenitsa – Patras
- Igoumenitsa – Cephalonia (during Summer months only)

External Maritime Traffic

- Igoumenitsa – Ancona
- Igoumenitsa – Venice
- Igoumenitsa – Trieste
- Igoumenitsa – Bari
- Igoumenitsa – Brindisi
- Igoumenitsa – Ravenna (regularly)

According to the draft strategy prepared by the relevant Ministry of Shipping (2012–2013) the port of Igoumenitsa becomes a "Connection Portal" not only of Greece with the rest of Europe, but of the whole of Europe with the Balkans, the Black Sea and the Middle East, through the development of combined transport (maritime-roads) directly and long-term (through the Egnatia railway), incorporating the railroad.

In the beginning of 2012, the First Phase of the construction project of the New Port had been completed and progression to the Second Phase has begun in late 2013 and was completed by 2016, when the Third Phase of the construction began. With the completion of the First phase, Igoumenitsa has become a modern, large port in the Mediterranean Sea, able to serve passenger, commercial and tourist traffic. The completion of the Second Phase, enabled the port to serve large cruise ships. Also, the planned creation of a freight centre in a section within the port area is estimated to greatly strengthen the commercial traffic and turn the city of Igoumenitsa into an international logistics centre.

Port traffic statistics as of 2012:

Port	Passengers	Cars	Trucks
Igoumenitsa	896,130	212,154	149,768
Patras	555,453	102,161	122,139

Igoumenitsa serves the 61.73% of the maritime traffic, the 67.49% of car traffic and the 55.08% of truck traffic annually.

== Population ==
The population of Igoumenitsa town is 10,315 residents and the urban area (municipal unit) is 18,562. The population of Municipality of Igoumenitsa is 25,698 permanent citizens. Igoumenitsa's population grew rapidly in recent years, as result of the increased traffic in the region because of the New Port. The chart below shows the development of the population of Igoumenitsa and the broader urban area according to the data of the Greek Statistical Agency:

== Geography and Climate ==
Igoumenitsa is located in the north-western corner of Greece in the regional unit of Thesprotia, which is part of the prefecture of Epirus. Igoumenitsa, like much of the west coast of Greece, has a hot-summer Mediterranean climate (Köppen: Csa) with mild to cool, rainy winters and hot, relatively dry summers.

== Tourism ==
Igoumenitsa is known for its green forests and blue crystal waters, and attracts many local tourists from the nearby regions, and especially from Italy. The city provides the possibility for walks, jogging on the beach or mountain, hiking, sports, boating or contact with nature. Also provides access to the Blue Flag beaches of Drepanos and Makrygiali with crystal clear waters and a length of 7 km, with both of them being situated on the northwestern edge of the Gulf of Igoumenitsa. The archaeological museum with exhibits from historical times until the Byzantines period. In recent years, the city has become a growing cruise destination, as cruise station for visits to archaeological sites and natural beauties of Thesprotia but also the entire Ionian coast.

=== Archaeological Museum ===
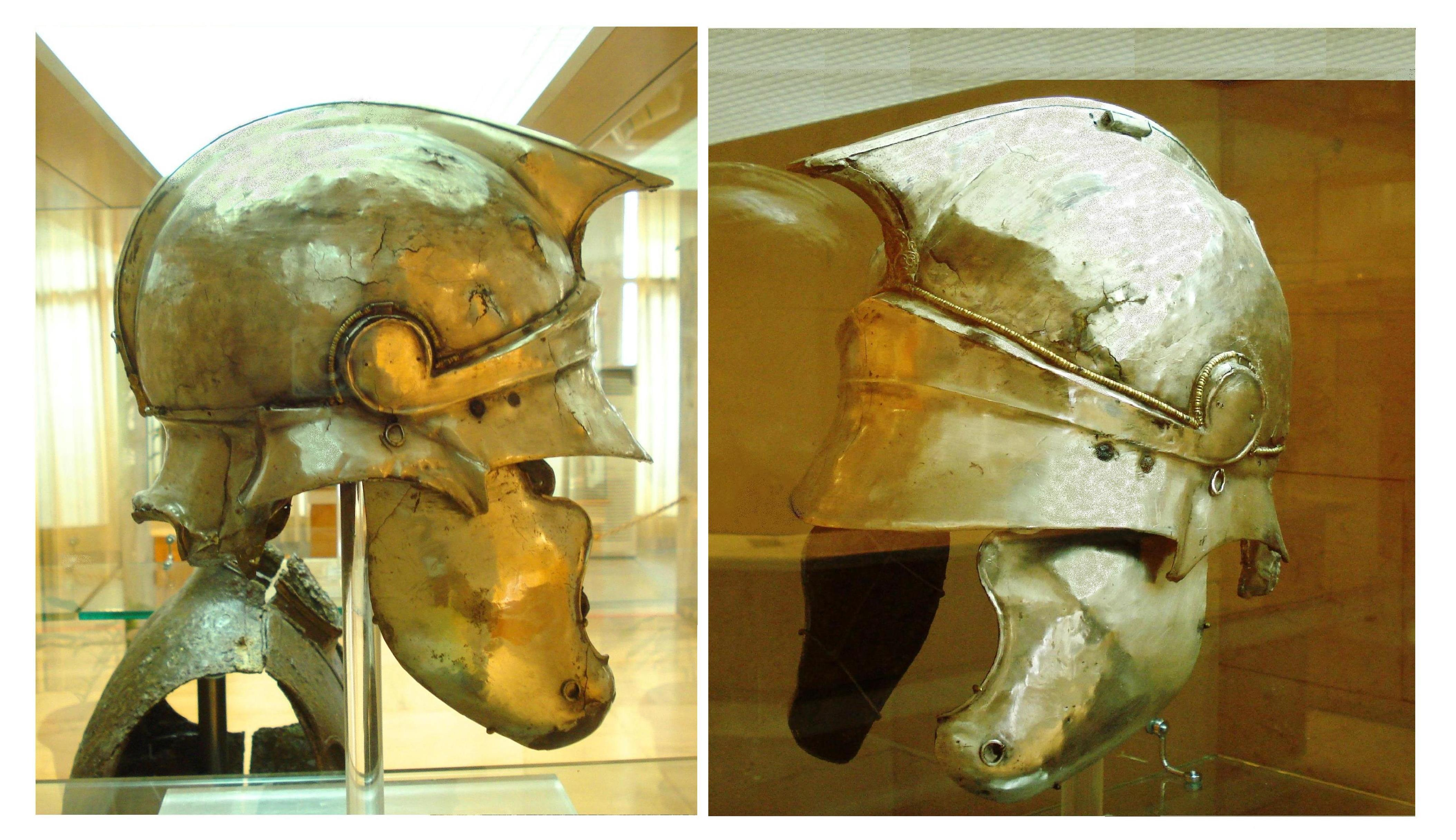
Silver ancient Epirotic helmet in the museum

The archaeological museum of Igoumenitsa was opened in 2009 and is located on the north side, next to the Fire Department of the city. It consists of five main sections that showcase the history and culture of the region of Thesprotia from ancient times to the Byzantine period: Archaeological-Historical background, Settlements of historical times, Public life, Private life, Burial customs.

== International relations ==
=== Twin cities ===
Igoumenitsa is twinned with:

- Sarandë, Albania
- Velbert, Germany

=== Consulates/diplomatic missions ===
Igoumenitsa hosts consulates from the following countries:

- Germany

== Gallery ==
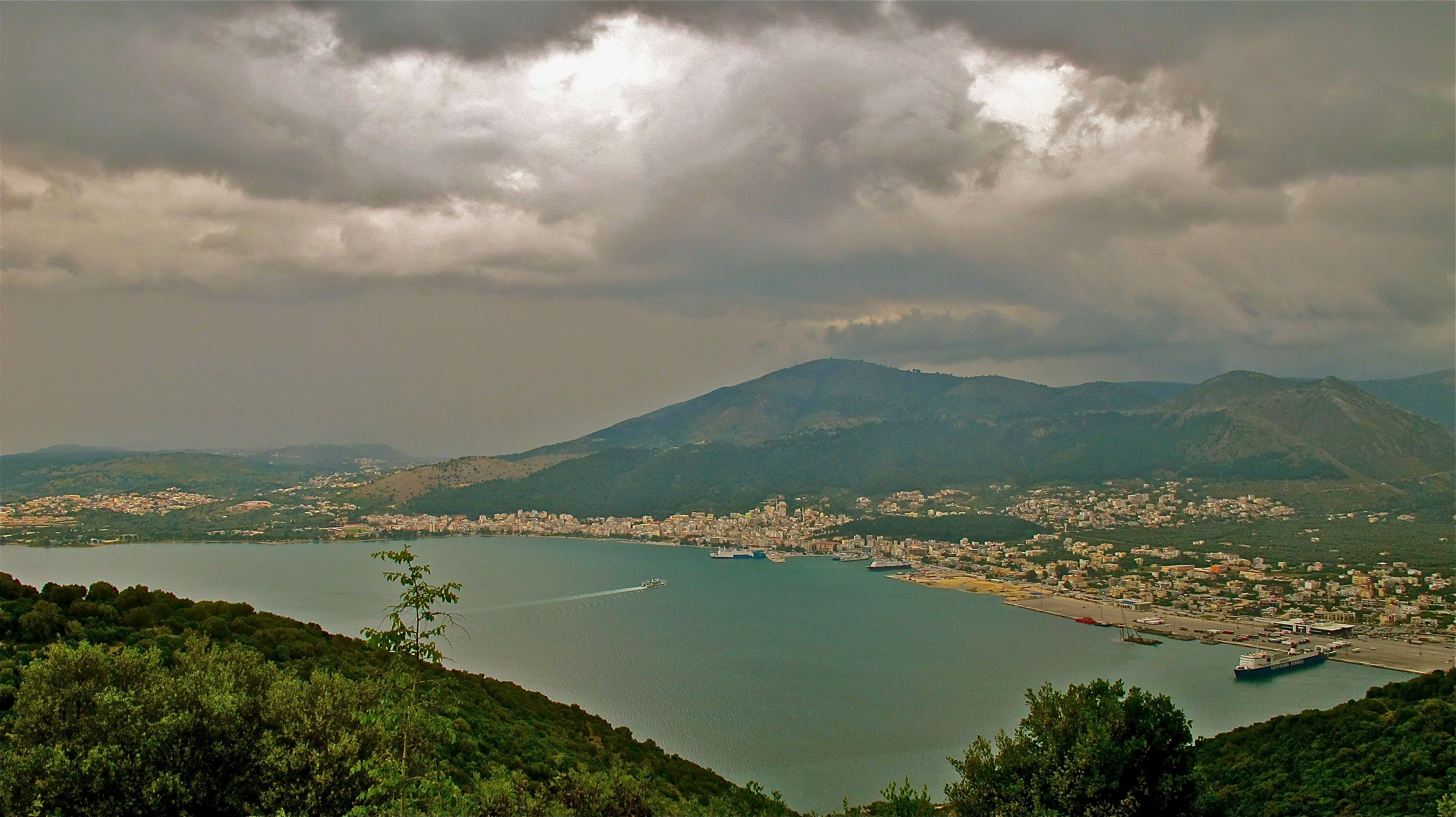
View of the city

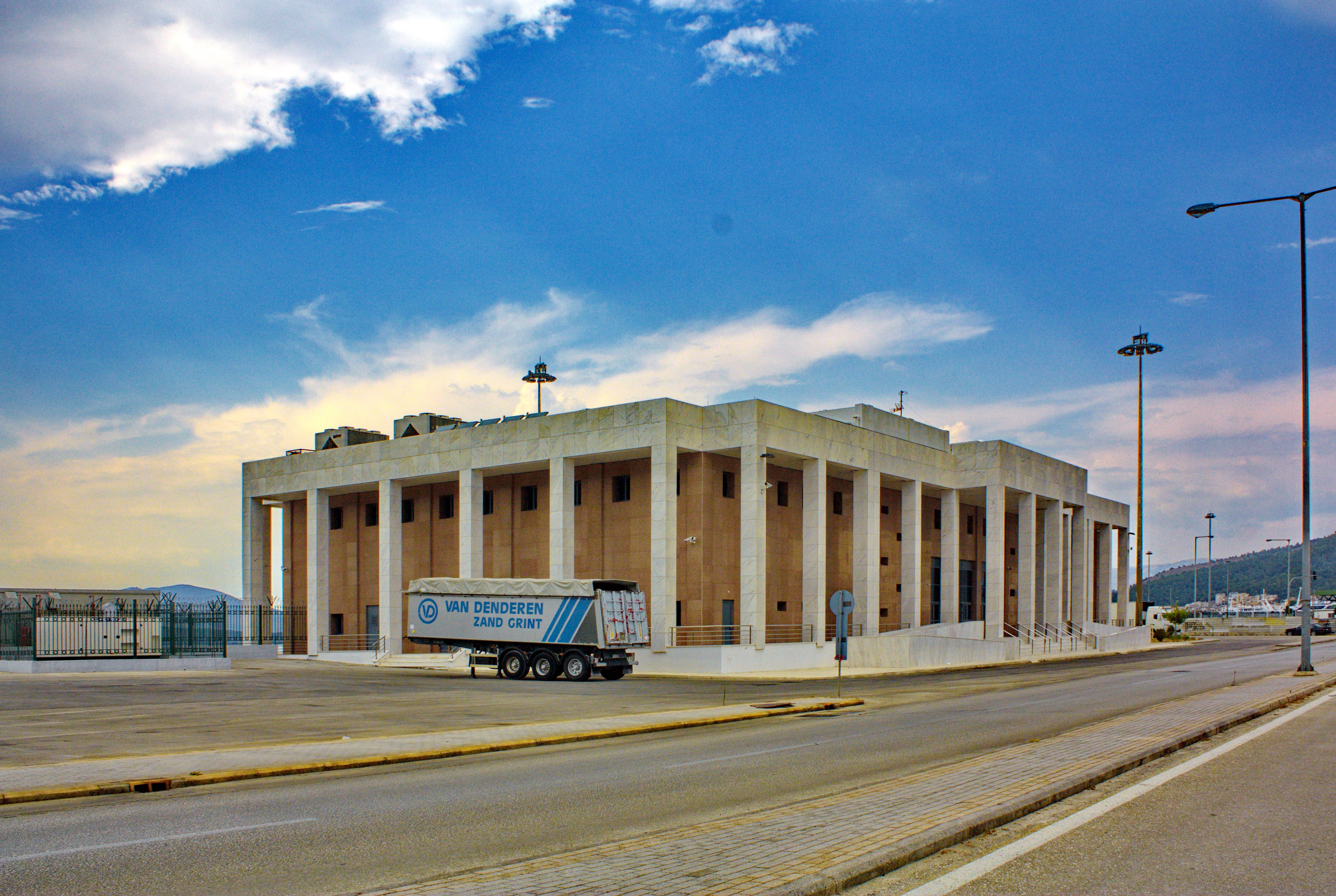
Ferry terminal

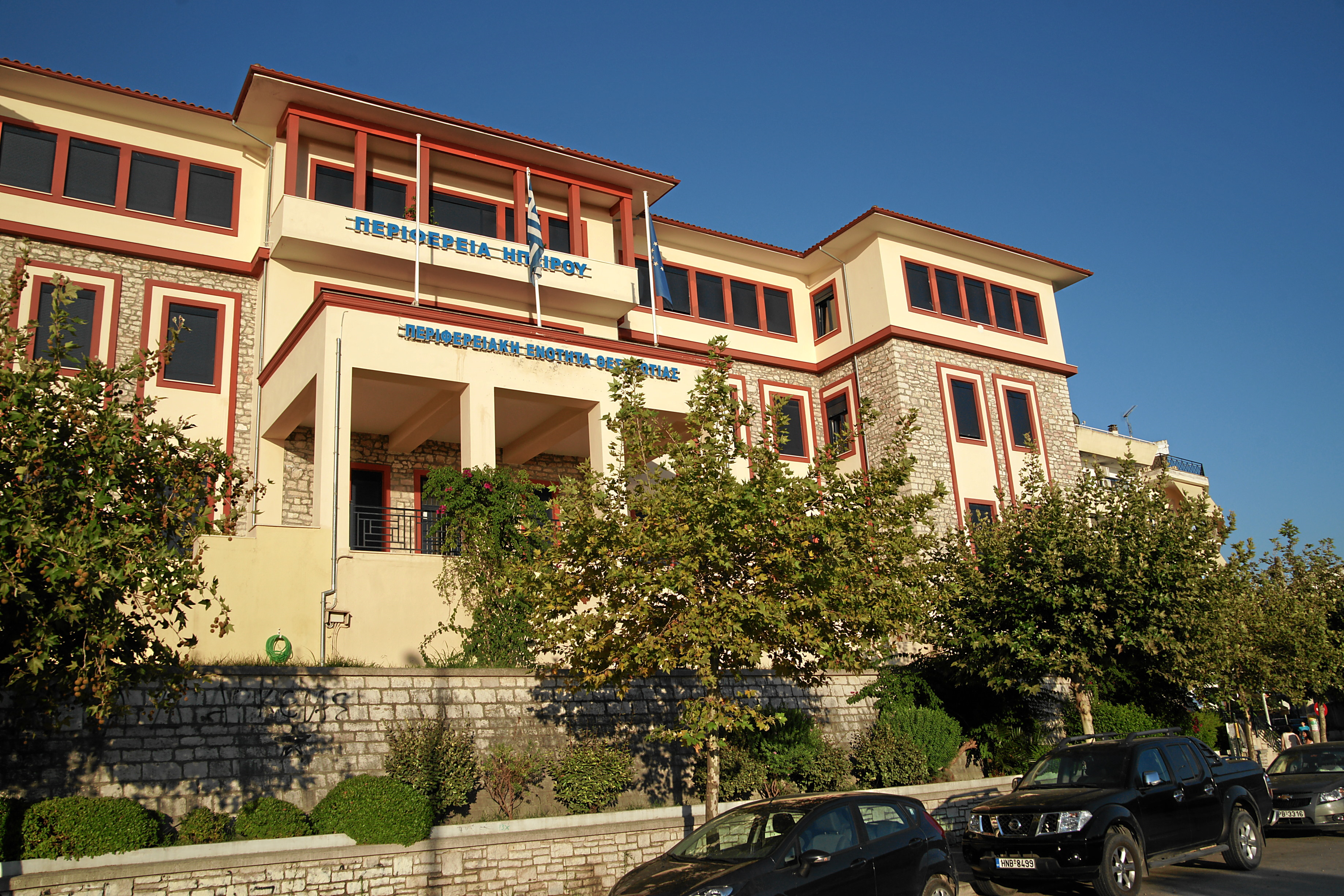
Thesprotia Regional unit offices building

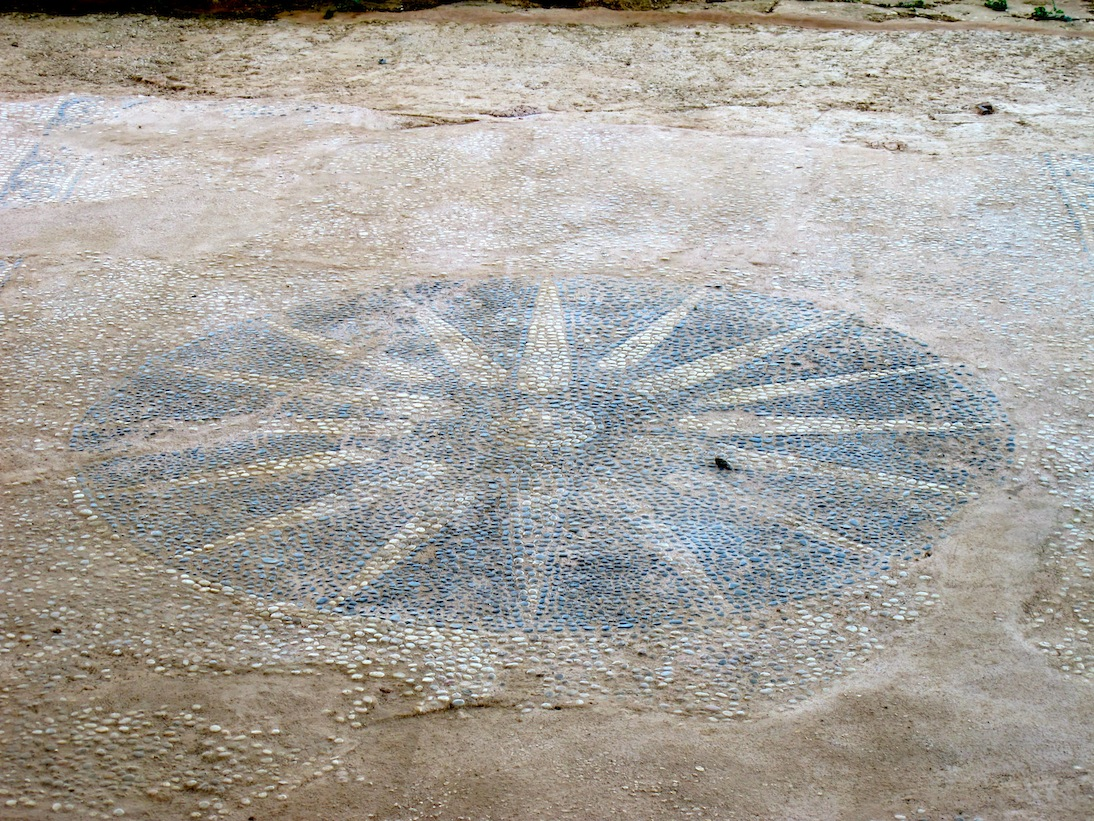
Mosaic depicting the Vergina Sun, Titana archeological site

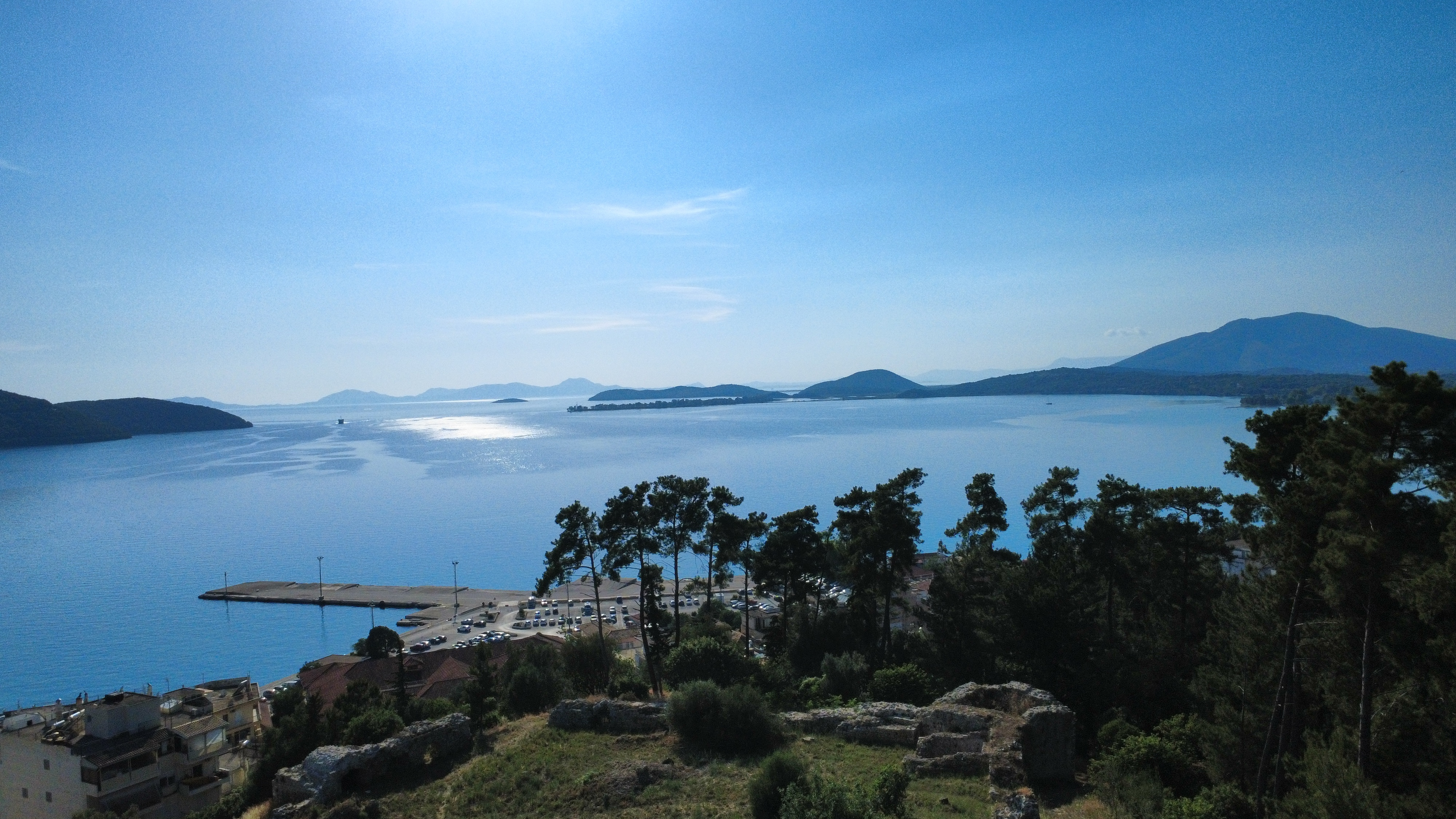
Aerial view of the port from the Igoumenitsa Castle

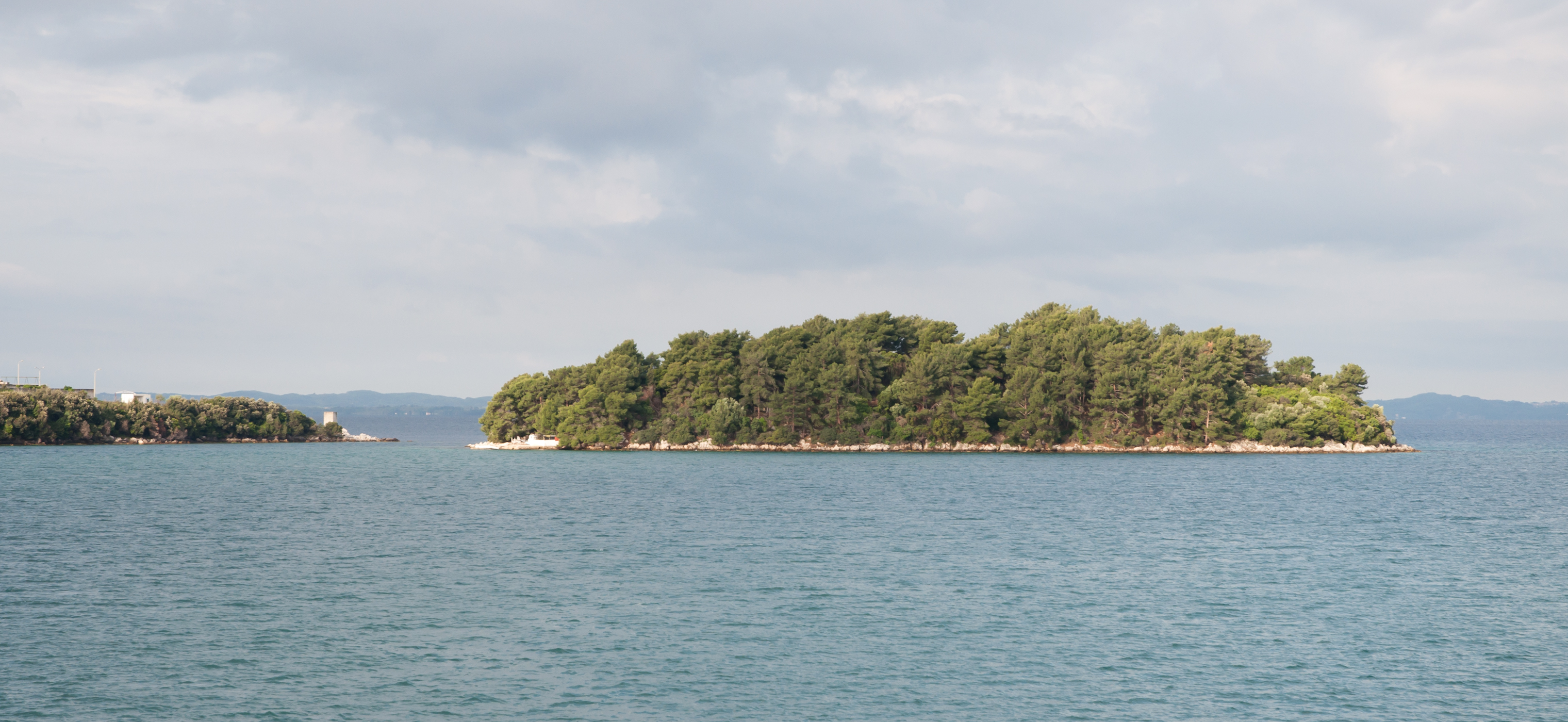
The Agios Dionysios island, at the Gulf of Igoumenitsa

== See also ==
- List of settlements in Thesprotia
- Port of Brindisi
