= Dino (given name) =

Male given name

- Gender: Male

Other gender
- Feminine: Dina

Origin
- Meaning: Little sword, brave bear, faith

Dino is a male given name.

== Geography ==
The name is popular among Italians, where it means "little sword" or "little bear."

In the Balkans, Dino is popular among Bosniaks and Croats in the former Yugoslav nations. Among Bosniaks, the name is derived from the Arabic word دين (din), meaning "faith." It is similar to other popular names in this group, such as Edin and Adin. It is often used as a nickname for males with "din" in their name, as seen with Sabahudin "Dino" Bilalović. This region also has a female equivalent: Dina, which is similar to Edina, another popular female name in the region.

== Given name ==
- Dino or Dinon (fl. c. 360–340 BC), ancient Greek historian
- Dino (footballer, born 1978), Brazilian football defender Dino Gonçalo Castro Jorge
- Dino Abazović (born 1972), Bosnian sociologist and professor
- Dino Abbrescia (born 1966), Italian actor
- Dino Acconci, member of Hong Kong–based rock band Soler
- Dino Adriano (1943–2018), British businessman
- Dino Agote (born 1996), Chilean footballer
- Dino Alfieri (1886–1966), Italian fascist politician and diplomat
- Dino Andrade (born 1963), American voice actor
- Dino Arslanagić (born 1993), Belgian professional footballer of Bosnian descent
- Dino Asciolla, member of the string group Quartetto Italiano
- Dino Attanasio (1925–2026), Italian-born Belgian comics writer and illustrator
- Dino Babers (born 1961), American football coach
- Dino Baggio (born 1971), Italian former professional footballer
- Dino Ballacci (1924–2013), Italian football player and manager
- Dino Ballarin (1925–1949), Italian footballer
- Dino Ballotti (born 1987), Namibian politician
- Dino Bardot (born 1972), Scottish musician and songwriter
- Dino Barsotti (1903–1985), Italian rower
- Dino Basaldella (1909–1977), Italian sculptor and painter
- Dino Battaglia (1923–1983), Italian comic artist
- Dino Bauk (born 1972), Slovenian lawyer and writer
- Dino Beganovic (born 2004), Swedish-Bosnian racing driver
- Dino Belosevic (born 1985), Croatian kickboxer
- Dino Bergens (born 1969), Dutch-Surinamese basketball player
- Dino Bertolo (born 1953), French racing cyclist
- Dino Beširović (born 1994), Portuguese-born Bosnian professional footballer
- Dino Betti van der Noot (born 1936), Italian jazz composer
- Dino Bevab (born 1993), Bosnian footballer
- Dino Bisanovic (born 1990), Bosnian footballer
- Dino Boffo (born 1952), Italian journalist
- Dino Borgioli (1891–1960), Italian lyric tenor
- Dino Bouterse (born 1972), son of former President of Suriname
- Dino Bovoli (1914–1988), Italian professional footballer and coach
- Dino Bravo (1948–1993), Italian-Canadian professional wrestler and promoter
- Dino Brugioni (1921–2015), American imagery analyst and bomb damage assessor
- Dino Bruni (born 1932), Italian road cyclist
- Dino Butorac (born 1990), Croatian basketball player
- Dino Buzzati (1906–1972), Italian writer and painter
- Dino Campana (1885–1932), Italian visionary poet
- Dino Campanella, member of American rock band Dredg
- Dino Casanova (1967–2002), American professional wrestler
- Dino Cassio (1934–2012), Italian actor and singer
- Dino Castagno (born 1993), Argentine professional footballer
- Dino Cazares (born 1969), guitarist for Divine Heresy and former guitarist for Fear Factory
- Dino Cellini (1914–1978), American gangster of Italian descent
- Dino Chiozza (1912–1972), American MLB player
- Dino Ciani (1941–1974), Italian pianist
- Dino Ciccarelli (born 1960), Canadian retired NHL player
- Dino Cinel, Italian-American historian, professor, and Roman Catholic priest
- Dino Claudio Sanchez, Filipino incumbent politician
- Dino Compagni (c. 1255–1324), Italian historical writer and political figure
- Dino Costa, American radio personality
- Dino Costantini (born 1940), Italian equestrian
- Dino Crescentini (1947–2008), Sammarinese bobsledder
- Dino Daa (born 1984), Filipino professional basketball player
- Dino da Costa (1931–2020), Brazilian-Italian former footballer
- Dino Danelli (1944–2022), American drummer
- Dino De Antoni (1936–2019), Italian Roman Catholic archbishop
- Dino De Poli (1929–2020), Italian lawyer and politician
- Dino De Zordo (born 1937), Italian ski jumper
- Dino Delevski (born 1976), American soccer player of Macedonian descent
- Dino Delmastro (born 1996), Argentine badminton player
- Dino del Garbo (c. 1280–1327), Italian medieval physician and philosopher
- Dino Dibra (1975–2000), Australian suspected murderer and a homicide victim
- Dino Di Luca (1903–1991), Italian actor of stage, screen, and television
- Dino Dines (1944–2004), British keyboarder
- Dino Dini (born 1965), creator of football video games
- Dino Djiba (born 1985), Senegalese former professional footballer
- Dino Djulbic (born 1983), Bosnian-Australian footballer
- Dino Dolmagić (born 1994), Serbian footballer
- Dino Don (1925–2007), Italian operatic baritone
- Dino Drpic (born 1981), Croatian professional footballer
- Dino Durbuzovic (born 1956), Bosnian professional football manager and former player
- Dino Duva (born 1958), American boxing promoter
- Dino Dvornik (1964–2008), Croatian singer-songwriter, music producer, actor, and reality television star
- Dino Ebel (born 1966), American baseball coach
- Dino Esposito (born 1965), Italian consultant, author, and MSDN magazine columnist
- Dino Eze (born 1984), Nigerian former footballer
- Dino Falconi (1902–1990), Italian screenwriter and film director
- Dino Fava (born 1977), Italian footballer
- Dino Fazlic (born 1991), German footballer
- Dino Fekaris (born 1945), Greek-American music producer and songwriter
- Dino Felicetti (born 1970), Italian-Canadian retired professional ice hockey player
- Dino Ferari, Italian drummer
- Dino Ferrari (1914–2000), Italian painter
- Dino Ferruzzi (born 1892), Italian equestrian
- Dino Fetscher (born 1988), Welsh actor
- Dino Formaggio (1914–2008), Italian philosopher, art critic, and academic
- Dino Gabriel, Italian-born Anglican bishop of Natal
- Dino Galparoli (born 1957), retired Italian footballer
- Dino Galvani (1890–1960), Italian actor
- Dino Gardner (born 1993), Canadian soccer player
- Dino Gaudio (born 1957), former American college basketball coach
- Dino Gavric (born 1989), Croatian footballer
- Dino Giarrusso (born 1974), Italian television personality and politician
- Dino Gifford (1917–2013), Italian professional footballer
- Dino Gillarduzzi (born 1975), Italian speed skater
- Dino Grandi (1895–1988), 1st Conte di Mordano, Italian Fascist politician
- Dino Hackett (born 1964), former American NFL player
- Dino Halilović (born 1998), Croatian footballer
- Dino Hall (born 1955), former American NFL player
- Dino Hamidović (born 1996), Bosnian handball player
- Dino Hamzić (born 1988), Bosnian professional footballer
- Dino Hotić (born 1995), Slovenian footballer
- Dino Imperial (born 1988), Filipino actor, Club MC, commercial model, and radio DJ
- Dino Innocenti (1913–1971), Italian ice hockey player
- Dino Islamović (born 1994), Swedish footballer
- Dino Jelusić (born 1992), Croatian rock singer, musician, and songwriter
- Dino Kartsonakis (born 1942), American pianist who plays Christian-influenced music
- Dino Kessler (born 1966), former Swiss professional ice hockey player
- Dino Klisura (born 1999), Bosnian musician and producer
- Dino Kluk (born 1991), professional Croatian footballer
- Dino Kotopoulis (1932–2020), American artist
- Dino Kovacec (born 1993), Croatian footballer
- Dino Kovacevic (born 1999), Austrian footballer
- Dino Kraspedon (1905–1985), Brazilian author
- Dino Kresinger (born 1982), Croatian footballer
- Dino Lalvani (born 1973), British businessman, chairman, and CEO
- Dino Lamb (born 1998), English rugby union player
- Dino Lanaro (1909–1998), Italian painter
- Dino Lee (born 1993), Taiwanese singer, composer, musician, and actor
- Dino Lenny, Italian DJ, singer, record producer, and record label owner
- Dino Liviero (1938–1970), Italian road racing cyclist
- Dino Lombardi (born 1990), Italian motorcycle racer
- Dino Lopez (born 1969), Canadian retired soccer player
- Dino Lucchetta (born 1968), Italian rowing coxswain
- Dino Maamria (born 1974), Tunisian football manager and former player
- Dino Maiuri (1916–1984), Italian screenwriter, film director, and producer
- Dino Mangiero (born 1958), retired professional American football player
- Dino Marcan (born 1991), Croatian professional tennis player
- Dino Marino (born 1985), former Italian footballer
- Dino Martens (1894–1970), Italian painter and glass artist
- Dino Martin (1920–1999), American professional basketball player and coach
- Dino Martinovic (born 1990), Slovenian footballer
- Dino Mascotto (born 1932), former Canadian professional hockey player and AHL player
- Dino Mattessich, Croatian-American university administrator and former college lacrosse coach and player
- Dino Medjedovic (born 1989), Bosnian footballer
- Dino Melaye (born 1974), Nigerian politician
- Dino Menardi (1923–2014), Italian ice hockey player
- Dino Meneghin (born 1950), Italian former professional basketball player
- Dino Mennillo (born 1975), Australian retired soccer player and current occupational therapist
- Dino Merlin (Edin Dervišhalidović, born 1962), Bosnian singer-songwriter
- Dino Mikanović (born 1994), Croatian footballer
- Dino Minichiello (born 1968), Canadian fashion designer and entrepreneur
- Dino Molinaro, band member of Ikon
- Dino Monduzzi (1922–2006), Italian prelate of the Catholic Church
- Dino Moras (born 1944), French biochemist and research director
- Dino Morea (born 1975), Indian model and actor
- Dino Morelli (born 1973), former racing driver
- Dino Muric (born 1990), Slovenian professional basketball player
- Dino Nardin (1932–2010), Italian rower
- Dino Natali, American stage- and television-actor
- Dino Ndlovu (born 1990), South African professional footballer
- Dino Pagliari (born 1957), Italian professional former footballer and manager
- Dino Patti Djalal (born 1965), former Indonesian Ambassador to the US
- Dino Pedriali (1950–2021), Italian photographer
- Dino Pedrone, American former President of Davis College
- Dino Perić (born 1994), Croatian professional footballer
- Dino Perrone Compagni (1879–1950), Italian fascist, military personnel, and politician
- Dino Philipson (1889–1972), Italian lawyer and politician
- Dino Philyaw (born 1970), retired American professional football player
- Dino Piero Giarda (born 1936), Italian economist and academic
- Dino Pita (born 1988), Bosnian-Swedish basketball player
- Dino Pogolotti (1879–1923), Italian real estate entrepreneur
- Dino Pompanin (1930–2015), Italian alpine skier
- Dino Phillips (1969–2025), American actor, model, and director
- Dino Porrini (born 1953), Italian former cyclist
- Dino Prižmić (born 2005), Croatian tennis player
- Dino Quattrocecere (born 1973), South African figure skater
- Dino Rada (born 1967), Croatian former professional basketball player
- Dino Radončić (born 1999), Montenegrin professional basketball player
- Dino Radoš (born 1991), Croatian professional basketball player
- Dino Ramic (born 1988), American soccer player
- Dino Rešidbegović (born 1975), Bosnian contemporary classic/electronic/experimental music composer
- Dino Restelli (1924–2006), American professional baseball player
- Dino Reyes Chua (born 1980), Filipino businessman and politician
- Dino Risi (1916–2008), Italian film director
- Dino Rondani (1868–1951), Italian socialist politician, lawyer, and parliamentarian
- Dino Rora (1945–1966), Italian swimmer
- Dino Rossi (born 1959), American politician and businessman
- Dino Sani (1932–2026), Brazilian footballer and coach
- Dino Sanlorenzo (1930–2020), Italian politician
- Dino Santana (1940–2010), Brazilian actor
- Dino Šarac (born 1990), Serbian footballer
- Dino Sefir (born 1988), Ethiopian long-distance runner
- Dino Segre (1893–1975), Italian writer
- Dino Seremet (born 1980), retired Slovenian footballer
- Dino Sete Cordas (1918–2006), Brazilian guitar player
- Dino Sex, member of the American punk rock band the Murder Junkies
- Dino Shafeek (1930–1984), Bangladeshi-British comedy actor
- Dino Sinovcic (born 1992), Croatian Paralympic swimmer
- Dino Skender (born 1983), Croatian professional football manager
- Dino Skorup (born 1999), Croatian professional footballer
- Dino Slavić (born 1992), Croatian handball player
- Dino Sokolovic (born 1988), Croatian Paralympic alpine skier
- Dino Spadetto (born 1950), retired Italian professional footballer
- Dino Staffa (1906–1977), Italian Cardinal of the Roman Catholic Church
- Dino Stancic (born 1992), Slovenian footballer
- Dino Stecher (born 1964), Swiss ice hockey coach and former player
- Dino Stiglec (born 1990), Croatian professional footballer
- Dino Tadello (born 1954), former Italian mountain runner and masters athlete
- Dino Tavarone (born 1942), Italian-Canadian actor
- Dino Terragni (1927–1979), Italian entrepreneur and inventor
- Dino Toppmoller (born 1980), German football manager and former player
- Dino Toso (1969–2008), Italian-Dutch engineer
- Dino Turcato (born 1946), Italian weightlifter
- Dino Urbani (1882–1958), Italian fencer
- Dino Valls (born 1959), Spanish painter
- Dino Vasso (born 1987), American football coach
- Dino Verde (1922–2004), Italian author, lyricist, playwright, and screenwriter
- Dino Verzini (born 1943), retired Italian track cyclist
- Dino Visser (born 1989), South African footballer
- Dino Waldren (born 1991), American rugby union player
- Dino Wells (born 1970), American actor, writer, boxer, and filmmaker
- Dino Wieser (born 1989), Swiss professional ice hockey player
- Dino Williams (born 1990), Jamaican international footballer
- Dino Yannopoulos (1919–2003), Metropolitan Opera director
- Dino Yulo (born 1963), Filipino politician
- Dino Zamparelli (born 1992), British racing driver
- Dino Zandegù (born 1940), Italian former cyclist
- Dino Zoff (born 1942), Italian former football goalkeeper
- Dino Zonić, Bosnian composer and conductor
- Dino Zucchi (1927–2011), Italian basketball player

== Nickname ==
- Dino Armas (born 1941), Uruguayan theater director and writer
- Dean Bandiera (1926–2020), Canadian football player
- Sabahudin Bilalovic (1960–2003), Bosnian professional basketball player
- Dino De Laurentiis (1919–2010), Italian film producer
- Alfredo Ferrari (1932–1956), Italian automotive engineer, Enzo Ferrari's son
- Dean Martin (1917–1995), American singer, actor, and comedian
- Dean Paul Martin (1951–1987), American singer and actor, Dean Martin's son
- Dino Saluzzi (born 1935), Argentine musician
- Dino Stamatopoulos (born 1964), American television comedy writer, actor, and producer

== Fictional characters ==
- Dino Ortolani, in the HBO drama series Oz, played by Jon Seda
- Dino Zerilli, in the crime drama series The Sopranos, played by Andy Davoli
- Dino (The Flintstones), Fred and Wilma Flintstone's pet dinosaur

== See also ==
- Dinos (disambiguation)
- Dino (surname)
