= Dino (surname) =

Dino is a surname. It may refer to:

- Abedin Dino (1843–1906), Albanian politician
- Abidin Dino (1913–1993), Turkish painter
- Ahmed Dino (1785–1849), Albanian military leader and politician
- Ali Dino (1889–1938), Albanian cartoonist and a Member of the Greek Parliament
- Flávio Dino (born 1968), Brazilian attorney, judge, politician and professor
- Gerald Nicholas Dino (1940–2020), American clergyman
- Güzin Dino (1910–2013), Turkish literary scholar, linguist, translator and writer
- Kenny Dino (Kenneth J. Diono, 1939–2009), American singer
- Nicolao Dino (born 1963), Brazilian jurist
- Rasih Dino (1865–1928), Albanian politician
- Sálvio Dino (1932–2020), Brazilian writer and politician
- Shahin Dino, Albanian politician and diplomat in the 19th and early 20th centuries
- Xhemil Dino (1894–1972), Albanian politician and diplomat

== See also ==
- Diño, Filipino surname
