= List of centenarians (authors, editors, poets and journalists) =

The following is a list of centenarians – specifically, people who became famous as authors, editors, poets and journalists – known for reasons other than their longevity. For more lists, see lists of centenarians.

All supercentenarians (above 110 years old)
Living

Name	Lifespan	Age	Reason for Notability
M. H. Abrams	1912–2015	102	American literary critic
Angelina Acuña	1905–2006	101	Guatemalan educator, writer and poet
Jacob Adler (aka: B. Kovner)	1874–1974	100	Polish-born Jewish-American Yiddish writer, poet, and humorist
Nan Hayden Agle	1905–2006	100	American children's writer
Said Akl	1912–2014	102	Lebanese writer and poet
Ashig Alasgar	1821–1926	105	Azerbaijani ashik
Roger Angell	1920–2022	101	American essayist, writer and poet
Ruth Nanda Anshen	1900–2003	103	American author and editor
Jaime Ardila Casamitjana	1919–2019	100	Colombian writer
Diana Athill	1917–2019	101	British literary editor, novelist and memoirist
Francisco Ayala	1906–2009	103	Spanish novelist
Ba Jin	1904–2005	100	Chinese author
Ann Barzel	1905–2007	101	American writer, critic and lecturer on dance
Ralph Bates	1899–2000	101	English novelist
Georgina Battiscombe	1905–2006	100	British biographer
Pierre Béarn	1902–2004	102	French poet
Pepin Bello	1904–2008	103	Spanish intellectual and writer
Eric Bentley	1916–2020	103	American playwright and theatre critic
Edward Bernays	1891–1995	103	Austrian-born American publicist
Harry Bernstein	1910–2011	101	English-American author
Colm de Bhailís	1796–1906	109	Irish poet, songwriter and stonemason
H.J. Blackham	1903–2009	105	British humanist author and philosopher
Lesley Blanch	1904–2007	102	English author and fashion critic
Ronald Blythe	1922–2023	100	English writer
Ralph de Boissière	1907–2008	100	Trinidadian-Australian author
Landrum Bolling	1913–2018	104	American journalist, diplomat, and noted pacifist
Georges Bonnet	1919–2021	101	French writer and poet
Salvador Borrego	1915–2018	102	Mexican journalist
John Boyd	1913–2021	108	Canadian communist journalist and editor
E. R. Braithwaite	1912–2016	104	Guyanese author
George Braziller	1916–2017	101	American book publisher
George E. Bria	1916–2017	101	American journalist
Sir Harry Brittain	1873–1974	100	British journalist and founder of the Empire Press Union
Arthur Judson Brown	1856–1963	106	American clergyman, missionary and author
William Slater Brown	1896–1997	100	American novelist, biographer and translator
Elfriede Brüning	1910–2014	103	German journalist and novelist
Geneviève Callerot	1916–2025	108	French novelist
Paco Cano	1912–2016	103	Spanish photojournalist
Patrick Skene Catling	1925–1926	100	British journalist and author
Chang Ch'ung-ho	1914–2015	101	Chinese-American poet, writer and educator
Fulgence Charpentier	1897–2001	103	Canadian journalist and columnist
Nirad C. Chaudhuri	1897–1999	101	Bengali-Indian writer
Yehuda Chitrik	1899–2006	106	American Chabad-Lubavitch author and Mashpia
Georges-Emmanuel Clancier	1914–2018	104	French poet
Beverly Cleary	1916–2021	104	American author
Julia Clements	1906–2010	104	English author and flower arranger
Norman Corwin	1910–2011	101	American writer, essayist, screenwriter, television producer, and teacher
Fleur Cowles	1908–2009	101	American author, editor and artist
Victoriano Crémer	1906–2009	102	Spanish poet
Wilbur Cross	1918–2019	100	American author
Ève Curie	1904–2007	102	American author and biographer; daughter of Pierre and Marie Curie
Bernard Binlin Dadié	1916–2019	103	Ivorian novelist, playwright and poet
Robin Dalton	1920–2022	101	Australian literary agent, journalist and memoirist
Hope Hale Davis	1903–2004	100	American feminist and communist, later author and writing teacher
Geoffrey Dearmer	1893–1996	103	British poet
Bessie Delany	1891–1995	104	American dentist, author and civil rights pioneer; younger sister of fellow centenarian Sadie Delany
Sadie Delany	1889–1999	109	American educator, author and civil rights pioneer; elder sister of fellow centenarian Bessie Delany
Güzin Dino	1910–2013	102	Turkish writer
Marjory Stoneman Douglas	1890–1998	108	American journalist, author, women's suffrage advocate, and conservationist
Milt Dunnell	1905–2008	102	Canadian sportswriter
Oscar Dystel	1912–2014	101	American publisher
Richard Eberhart	1904–2005	101	American poet; Pulitzer Prize winner
Julius Eisenstein	1854–1956	101	Russian-American writer and historian
Mari Ellis	1913–2015	101	Welsh feminist writer
Nils Elowsson	1890–1999	109	Swedish journalist and politician
Jeannette Eyerly	1908–2008	100	American writer
Lawrence Ferlinghetti	1919–2021	101	American poet
Charles Fern	1892–1995	102	American journalist and aviator
Hélio Fernandes	1921–2021	100	Brazilian journalist
Edward Field	1924–2026	102	American poet and author
Juan Filloy	1894–2000	105	Argentinian writer
Traute Foresti	1915–2015	100	Austrian poet and actress
Neta Lohnes Frazier	1890–1990	100	American children's author
Mariana Frenk-Westheim	1898–2004	106	German-Spanish writer
Jacque Fresco	1916–2017	101	American futurist
Jean Fritz	1915–2017	101	American children's author
Dorothy Frooks	1896–1997	101	American author, publisher, military officer and military lawyer
Ruth Stiles Gannett	1923–2024	100	American children's writer
Luciana Frassati Gawronska	1902–2007	105	Polish-Italian author
Margot Gayle	1908–2008	100	American author and historical preservationist
Edward K. Gaylord	1873–1974	101	American newspaper publisher and philanthropist
Mildred Gillett	1909–2014	105	English author on local history.
Itche Goldberg	1904–2006	102	Yiddish writer, scholar and political activist
Miriam Goldberg	1916–2017	100	American newspaper publisher and editor
Eugen Gomringer	1925–2025	100	Bolivia-born Swiss poet
Bernice Gordon	1914–2015	101	American cruciverbalist
Hester Gaskell Holland Gorst	1887–1992	105	British writer and artist
Javare Gowda	1915–2016	100	Indian Kannada language author
George F. Grant	1906–2008	102	American author on angling and innovator of fly tying
Francesc Gras Salas	1921–2022	101	Catalan ophthalmologist and writer
Ruth Gruber	1911–2016	105	American journalist and writer
Doris Grumbach	1918–2022	104	American novelist, memoirist, biographer, literary critic, and essayist
Charles H. Hayward	1898–1998	100	British author, editor, and illustrator of books and magazines on woodworking; also a cabinet maker
Józef Hen	1923–	103	Polish writer, screenwriter and dramaturge
Andrés Henestrosa	1906–2008	101	Mexican writer
Học Phi	1913–2014	101	Vietnamese dramatist
Drue Heinz	1915–2018	103	American literary publisher (The Paris Review) and patron (Drue Heinz Literature Prize)
Clare Hollingworth	1911–2017	105	British journalist, first correspondent to report on World War II
Joan Hollobon	1920–2024	104	Welsh-born Canadian writer and journalist
Edith Iglauer	1917–2019	101	American writer
William Arthur Irwin	1898–1999	101	Canadian journalist and diplomat
Mohammad-Ali Jamalzadeh	1892–1997	105	Iranian writer
Elizabeth Jenkins	1905–2010	104	English novelist
Satya Mohan Joshi	1920–2022	102	Nepalese writer and scholar
Muhammad Ibrahim Joyo	1915–2017	102	Indian nationalist writer and scholar
Ernst Jünger	1895–1998	102	German writer
Irena Jurgielewiczowa	1903–2003	100	Polish author
Bernard Kalb	1922–2023	100	American journalist, moderator, and author
Joseph Nathan Kane	1899–2002	103	American author
Bel Kaufman	1911–2014	103	German-born American novelist and professor
Hans Keilson	1909–2011	101	German-Dutch novelist, poet, psychoanalyst and child psychologist
Hossein Wahid Khorasani	1921–2026	105	Iranian author and ayatollah
Ted Knap	1920–2023	102	American journalist
Masajirō Kojima	1894–1994	100	Japanese novelist
William Krehm	1913–2019	105	Canadian author, foreign correspondent and Spanish Civil War volunteer
Stanley Kunitz	1905–2006	100	American poet; two-time Poet Laureate (1974 and 2000)
André Lafargue	1917–2017	100	French journalist and theatre critic
Marc Lamunière	1921–2021	100	Swiss writer
Anthony Lawrence	1912–2013	101	British journalist
Erna Lazarus	1903–2006	102	American screenwriter
Chin Yang Lee	1915–2018	102	Chinese-American author
Frances M. López-Morillas	1918–2018	100	American translator of Spanish literature
Krystyna Łyczywek	1920–2021	100	Polish photographer, translator and journalist
Ma Shitu	1915–2024	109	Chinese writer and politician
Dorothy Maclean	1920–2020	100	Canadian writer and educator
Michio Mado	1909–2014	104	Japanese poet
George Mandel	1920–2021	101	American Beat writer
Clément Marchand	1912–2013	100	Canadian author, poet, journalist and publisher
Claire Martin	1914–2014	100	Canadian novelist
Lambert Mascarenhas	1914–2021	106	Indian journalist (The Navhind Times and Goa Today), independence activist and writer
Mildred Shapley Matthews	1915–2016	101	American book editor and writer, best known for her astronomy books
Lorna McDonald	1916–2017	100	Australian author and historian
Joe Medicine Crow	1913–2016	102	American Crow historian and author
Polly Allen Mellen	1924–2024	100	American fashion editor and stylist
Louise Meriwether	1923–2023	100	American author and activist
Erik Mesterton	1903–2004	100	Swedish author, literary critic and translator
Curt Meyer-Clason	1910–2012	101	German writer and translator
Morton Mintz	1922–2025	103	American journalist
Naomi Mitchison	1897–1999	101	Scottish writer
Alicia Moreau de Justo	1885–1986	100	Argentine writer
Henry Morgenthau III	1917–2018	101	American writer
John G. Morris	1916–2017	100	American author, photojournalist and picture editor
Ruth Munce	1898–2001	103	American romance novelist
Carla Porta Musa	1902–2012	110	Italian essayist and poet
Maurice Nadeau	1911–2013	102	French writer and editor
Fumio Niwa	1904–2005	100	Japanese novelist
Lise Nørgaard	1917–2023	105	Danish journalist and writer
Eleanor Owen	1921–2022	101	American journalist, playwright, actress, professor and mental health advocate
Boris Pahor	1913–2022	108	Italian Slovenian novelist and concentration camp survivor
Lillian Rogers Parks	1897–1997	100	American writer
Nicanor Parra	1914–2018	103	Chilean poet
Frances Partridge	1900–2004	103	English diarist; member of the Bloomsbury Group
James Larkin Pearson	1879–1981	101	American poet; Poet Laureate of North Carolina (1953–81)
Michel Peyramaure	1922–2023	101	French writer
José Osvaldo de Meira Penna	1917–2017	100	Brazilian classical liberal writer
Fernando Pessa	1902–2002	100	Portuguese journalist and radio broadcaster
Chapman Pincher	1914–2014	100	British writer
Nilawan Pintong	1915–2017	101	Thai feminist writer
Gertrude Poe	1915–2017	101	American journalist, lawyer and real estate agent
Ida Pollock	1908–2013	105	British romance novelist
Tao Porchon-Lynch	1918–2020	101	American author, dancer and yogi
Giuseppe Prezzolini	1882–1982	100	Italian journalist and writer
Edith Ballinger Price	1897–1997	100	American author of children's books
Carl Rakosi	1903–2004	101	American Objectivist poet
Joana Raspall i Juanola	1913–2013	100	Spanish writer
Naomi Replansky	1918–2023	104	American poet
Madeleine Riffaud	1924–2024	100	French poet, journalist and member of the French Resistance
Richard Rohmer	1924–	102	Canadian novelist, lawyer and aviator
Ahmad Samii Gilani	1921–2023	102	Iranian translator and editor
Pura Santillan-Castrence	1905–2007	101	Filipino author and diplomat
Aiko Satō	1923–2026	102	Japanese writer and author
Constance Savery	1897–1999	101	English author, principally of children's books
Gil Savery	1917–2018	101	American journalist
Marian Cannon Schlesinger	1912–2017	105	American artist and author
Claude Seignolle	1917–2018	101	French author
George Seldes	1890–1995	104	American journalist and writer
K. D. Sethna	1904–2011	106	Indian author and poet
Gene Shalit	1926–2026	100	American journalist and film critic
Mildred Shapley Matthews	1915–2016	100	American book editor
Toyo Shibata	1911–2013	101	Japanese poet
Vera Shlakman	1909–2017	108	American Marxist writer and academic
Jakob Skarstein	1921–2021	100	Norwegian journalist and radio personality
Barbosa Lima Sobrinho	1897–2000	103	Brazilian historian, writer and journalist
Marga Spiegel	1912–2014	101	German writer
Edna Staebler	1906–2006	100	Canadian writer
Margarita Stāraste-Bordevīka	1914–2014	100	Latvian writer
Barrie Stavis	1906–2007	100	American playwright
Grace Zaring Stone	1891–1991	100	American novelist
Audrey Stubbart	1895–2000	105	American newspaper columnist
Peter Stursberg	1913–2014	101	Canadian writer and broadcaster
Dragutin Tadijanović	1905–2007	101	Croatian poet and writer
Gladys Tantaquidgeon	1899–2005	106	American anthropologist and author
Ellen Tarry	1906–2008	101	American writer specialized in children's literature
Ruth Ashton Taylor	1922–2024	101	American television and radio newscaster
Jean Bell Thomas	1881–1982	101	American folk festival promoter, traveler and author
Frits Thors	1909–2014	104	Dutch journalist and news anchor
Calvin Tomkins	1925–2026	100	American author and art critic
Vance Trimble	1913–2021	107	American journalist
Walter Trohan	1903–2003	100	American writer and historian
Daisy Turner	1883–1988	104	American storyteller and poet
William Ungar	1913–2013	100	Polish-born American author
Edward Upward	1903–2009	105	English writer
Josep Vallverdu	1923–2026	103	Catalonian author
Henri Vernes	1918–2021	102	Belgian author
Molla Vali Vidadi	1709–1809	100	Azerbaijani ashik
Ida Vitale	1923–	103	Uruguayan poet and author
Edward Wagenknecht	1900–2004	104	American co-author of White House memoirs
Alison Waley	1901–2001	100	New Zealand poet and author
Ann B. Walker	1923–2025	101	American journalist, editor and broadcaster
Arthur Walworth	1903–2005	101	American writer and biographer of Woodrow Wilson
Curt Weibull	1886–1991	105	Swedish historian and author
Ruth Weiss	1924–2025	101	German-born South African writer
Phyllis A. Whitney	1903–2008	104	American mystery writer
Mary Wilson, Lady Wilson of Rievaulx	1916–2018	102	English poet; wife of British Prime Minister Harold Wilson
Herman Wouk	1915–2019	103	American author
Yang Jiang	1911–2016	104	Chinese playwright, author and translator
Donald Zec	1919–2021	102	British journalist
Zheng Min	1920–2022	101	Chinese poet
Lester Ziffren	1906–2007	101	First American journalist to report on the Spanish Civil War
Juan Eduardo Zúñiga	1919–2020	101	Spanish author and literary scholar
