= Moras (surname) =

Moras is a surname. Notable people with the name Moras or de Moras include:

- Marie-Angélique Frémyn de Moras (1676–1763), French courtier and memoirist
- Abraham Peyrenc de Moras (1684–1732), French banker
- Walter Moras (1856–1925), German painter
- Bernard Blasius Moras (born 1941), Indian prelate of the Roman Catholic Church
- Dino Moras (born 1944), French biochemist
- Karen Moras (born 1954), Australian Olympic distance freestyle swimmer
- Narelle Moras (born 1956), Australian Olympic freestyle swimmer
- Carolina de Moras (born 1981), Chilean model, actress and television presenter
- Davide Moras (born 1981), Italian metal and rock singer also known as Damna or Damnagoras
- Vangelis Moras (born 1981), Greek football player
- Sarah Moras (born 1988), Canadian mixed martial artist
- Gladys Roldan-de-Moras, Mexican-American painter
