= Rasih Dino =

Albanian politician, diplomat and activist (1865–1927/28)

Rasih Dino (1865–1927 or 1928) was an Albanian politician, diplomat and a figure of the Albanian national movement of the early 20th century.

== Life ==
Rasih Dino was born in 1865 in Preveza to the notable Dino family of the area. His father was Abedin Dino, one of the founders of the League of Prizren. Rasih Dino's children include Ali, famous cartoonist and member of the Hellenic Parliament, Leyla Dino Ileri, Abidin (named after his father Abidin) famous painter, and Ahmet (named after Rasih's grandfather Ahmed).

In 1908 he funded along with Musa Demi and other locals of Filiates the first Albanian-language school of the town. In 1913 he was the head of the delegation of Albania that signed the Treaty of London. The other two members of the delegation were Mehmed Konica and Filip Noga.

== Death ==
Rasih Dino died at the end of 1927 or the beginning of 1928 in Adana.
