= Abidin Pasha Dino =

Ottoman Albanian politician and poet (1843–1906)

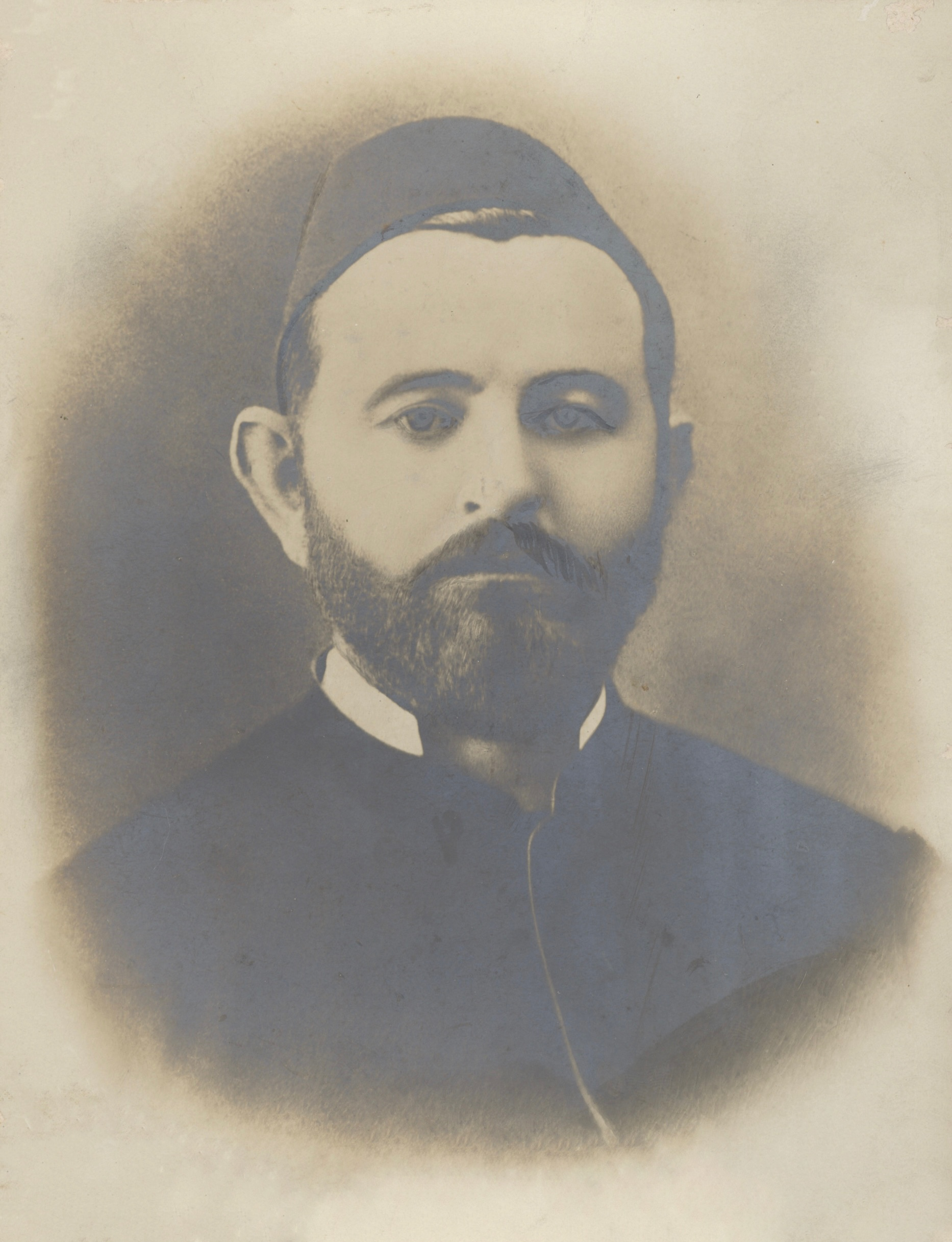
- Born: 5 April 1843; Preveza, Ottoman Empire (modern day Greece)
- Died: 9 May 1906 (aged 63); Istanbul, Ottoman Empire (modern day Turkey)
- Known for: contributor in the Albanian independence
- Children: Rasih Dino (son)
- Parent(s): Ahmed Dino (father), Saliha Çapari (mother)
- Relatives: Vesel Dino (brother), Ali Dino (grandson) Leyla Dino Ileri (granddaughter), Abidin Dino (named after his grandfather) (grandson), and Ahmet Dino (grandson) (named after his great grandfather Ahmed Dino)
- Family: Dino

Abidin Pasha Dino or Abedin bey Dino (Turkish: Prevezeli Abeddin Bey Dino), also Abedin Pasha (Turkish: Prevezeli Abidin Paşa; 5 April 1843 – 9 May 1906) was an Albanian patriot, politician, ideologue and diplomat. As a rilindas involved in the Albanian National Awakening, he was one of the founders of the League of Prizren and its chief representative for Epirus (1878). Dino was one of the main promoters in the need for the creation of the Autonomous Albanian Vilayet under the Ottoman suzerainty.

== Biography ==
Abidin Pasha Dino was from Chameria, and he was born in Preveza on 23 March 1843, to one of the most notable and noble Albanian families of the city (the Dino family). He was the brother of Vesel Bey Dino and his father Ahmed Dino Bey (1785–1849) was an Albanian military leader and politician, his mother was Saliha Çapari an Albanian woman from Capari. He studied in the Zosimaia School and the University of Paris. In 1876 he became one of the legislators of Kanûn-ı Esâsî, the first constitution of the Ottoman Empire. Dino was also a Commissar of Bursa.

During the Great Eastern Crisis Dino was one of ten signatories to a memorandum addressed to Berlin Congress hosts chancellor Bismarck and Count Andrassy on 20 June 1878 calling for reforms and Albanians to remain in the Ottoman state with their rights, desires, interests and traditions being respected. Dino strongly supported the territorial integrity of Albanian inhabited lands remaining within the Ottoman state. By December 1878 the Ottoman government made Dino one of three commissioners who were tasked with delineating a defensible border in negotiations with the Greeks that occurred at Preveza on 5 February 1879. Dino became a prominent League of Prizren leader in 1878 and a member of its central committee representing Chameria. Together with Abdyl Frashëri, Vesel Dino and Mehmet Ali Vrioni he established local League branches of the Albanian Committee of Janina and Assembly of Preveza. On 11 January 1879, a meeting in Preveza of Albanian notables and leaders at Dino's house agreed to oppose Epirus joining Greece, including through the use of military force if an unsatisfactory agreement was imposed by the Great Powers and to express that view to the Berlin Congress. A delay in border negotiations occurred and Greek authorities thought it was due to Dino convening the Preveza meeting and to make Albanian leaders sign petitions against an annexation of Epirus by Greece. The free movement of Dino in Preveza and his appointment as a commissioner for delineating the border were examples of the support the Ottoman Empire gave to the League during this time.

From 10 June to 12 September 1880 Dino briefly served as the Minister of Foreign Affairs of the Ottoman Empire for four months and was elevated to the rank of Pasha, becoming known as Abidin Pasha. Abdul Hamid II appointed Dino as he wanted to strengthen the Ottoman position during negotiations about the border with Greece. Dino thought that he got the position due to the sultan wanting to conciliate the British. As foreign minister he expressed reservations about Jannina and the wider area of Chameria being given to Greece, due to the large Muslim Albanian population of the area and subsequent troubles it would cause the empire. He argued to keep both Jannina, the regional capital and Preveza, its trading port within the Ottoman state. Local Ottoman officials had reservations about arming Albanians due to concerns that weapons in future could be used against the sultan. However, Dino placed his own people as governors of various areas including his brother in law Kazim Bey in Preveza. In part due to his efforts and activities, the Vilayet of Janina did not join Greece and remained within the Ottoman Empire until 1912. He became a wāli (governor) of Aden and from 1904 Vizier (minister) in the Ottoman government headed by fellow Albanian Avlonyalı Mehmed Ferid Pasha.

Abidin Pasha was also a poet, publisher, writer, and translator. He wrote many songs, including the famous "Këngë për Shqipërin" (alb. "Song for Albania", in 1879), "Të nxiturit e Shqipërisë duke përpjeturë" (1880), "Poema e Shenjtë" (Poema of Saint, 1884), "Poetry" (1888). He translated Albanian language poems of the 13th-century Persian poet, and Sufi mystic Rumi.

His son, Rasih Dino was a co-founder of the first Albanian school in the city of Filiates and in 1913 he was the head of the delegation of Albania that signed the Treaty of London that recognized Albania an independent state. His grandchildren from his son Rasih were, Ali Dino, Leyla Dino Ileri, Abidin Dino (named after his grandfather, Abidin Pasha himself) and Ahmet Dino (named after his great grandfather Ahmed Dino, Abidin's father)

== See also ==
- Cham Albanians
- League of Prizren
