= Margarita Stāraste-Bordevīka =

Latvian writer

Margarita Stāraste-Bordevīka (née Barvika; 2 February 1914 – 18 February 2014) was a Latvian children's books writer, born in Vladimir, Tsarist Russia.

Stāraste-Bordevīka's most popular books are Balti tīri sniega vīri (1942), Ziemassvētku pasakas (1943), Zīļuks (1961), Pasaku ābece (1969) and Lācīša Rūcīša raibā diena (1977). Her first book was published in 1942. She co-authored a collection of folksongs in the Livonian language Urū! Rurū! (1994), later published in Latvian as well.

On 7 April 1999, Stāraste-Bordevīka was awarded the title as Commander of the Order of the Three Stars. Stāraste-Bordevīka died on 18 February 2014, 16 days after her 100th birthday.

== See also ==
- List of centenarians (authors, poets and journalists)
