= Ali Dino =

Greek cartoonist and a Member of the Greek Parliament (1890–1938)

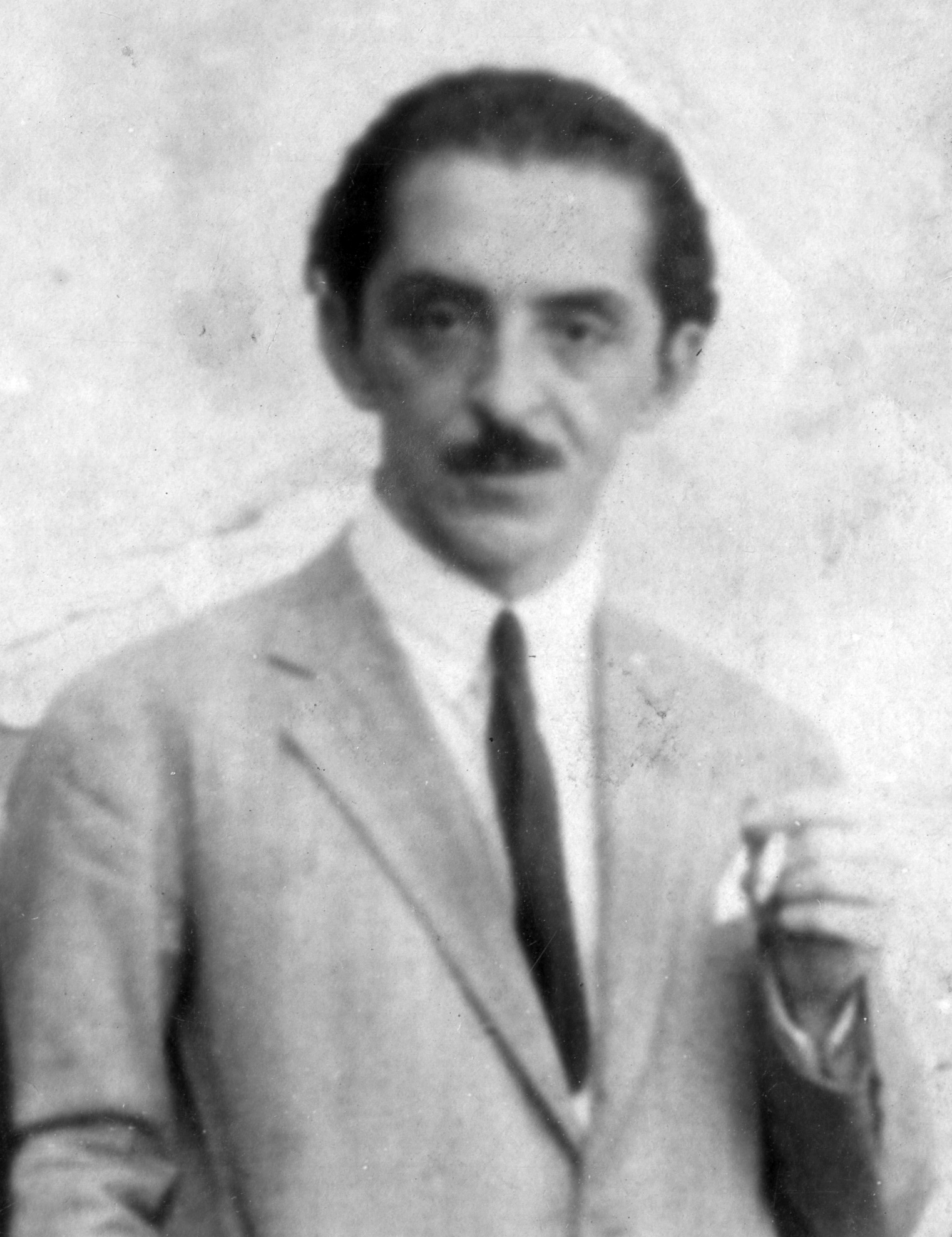
- Ali Dino in 1930
- Born: 1890; Chios or Preveza, Ottoman Empire, modern day Greece
- Died: 1938 (aged 47–48); Athens, Greece
- Occupations: cartoonist, politician

Ali Dino (Greek: Αλή Ντίνο), also known as Ali Dino Bey (Albanian: Ali Bej Dino; Greek: Αλή Ντίνο Μπέης, 1890–1938) was an Albanian cartoonist and a Member of the Greek Parliament.

== Biography ==
Dino was born in Chios, in the Vilayet of the Archipelago of the Ottoman Empire in 1890, to Rasih Dino. He was grandson of Abedin Dino, one of the main contributors of the Albanian independence. His family were from Preveza, Chameria. His siblings were Leyla Dino Ileri, Abidin Dino (named after his grandfather Abedin) famous painter, and Ahmet (named after his great-grandfather Ahmed Dino). He became one of the most famous cartoonists in Greece, and was elected in the Greek Parliament for the Preveza prefecture in 1915. Dino later founded the Party of the Chameria, that represented the local Cham Albanian community as well as of the Greek Albanian Friendship Society. He died in Athens, Greece, in 1938.

== Works ==
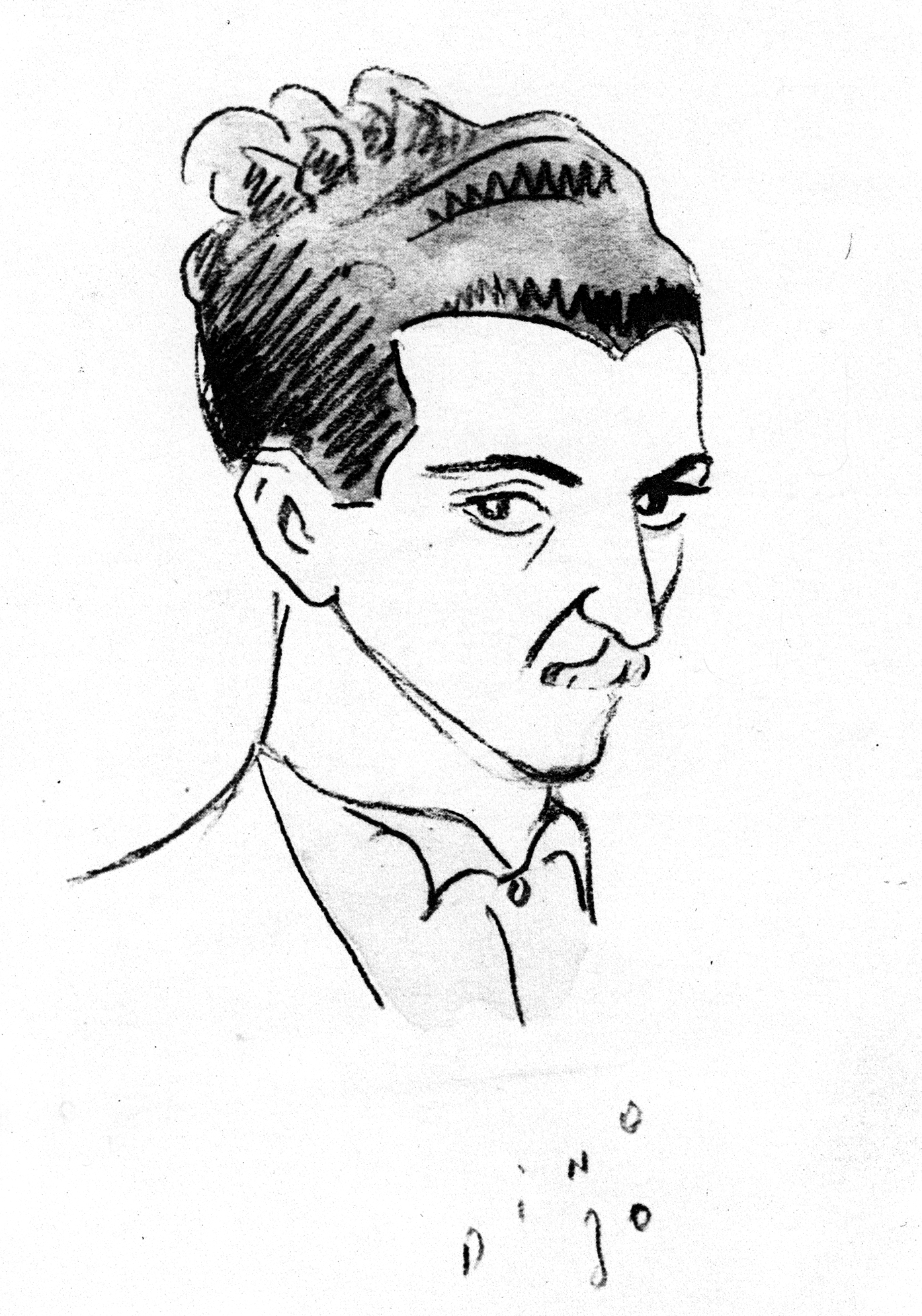
Self portrait

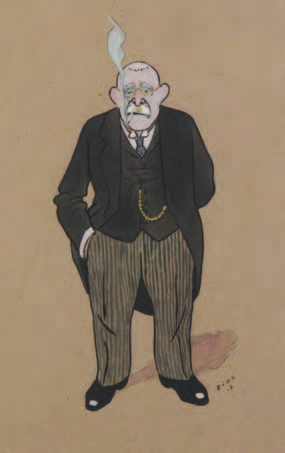
Caricature (1917) Municipal Art Gallery of Ioannina

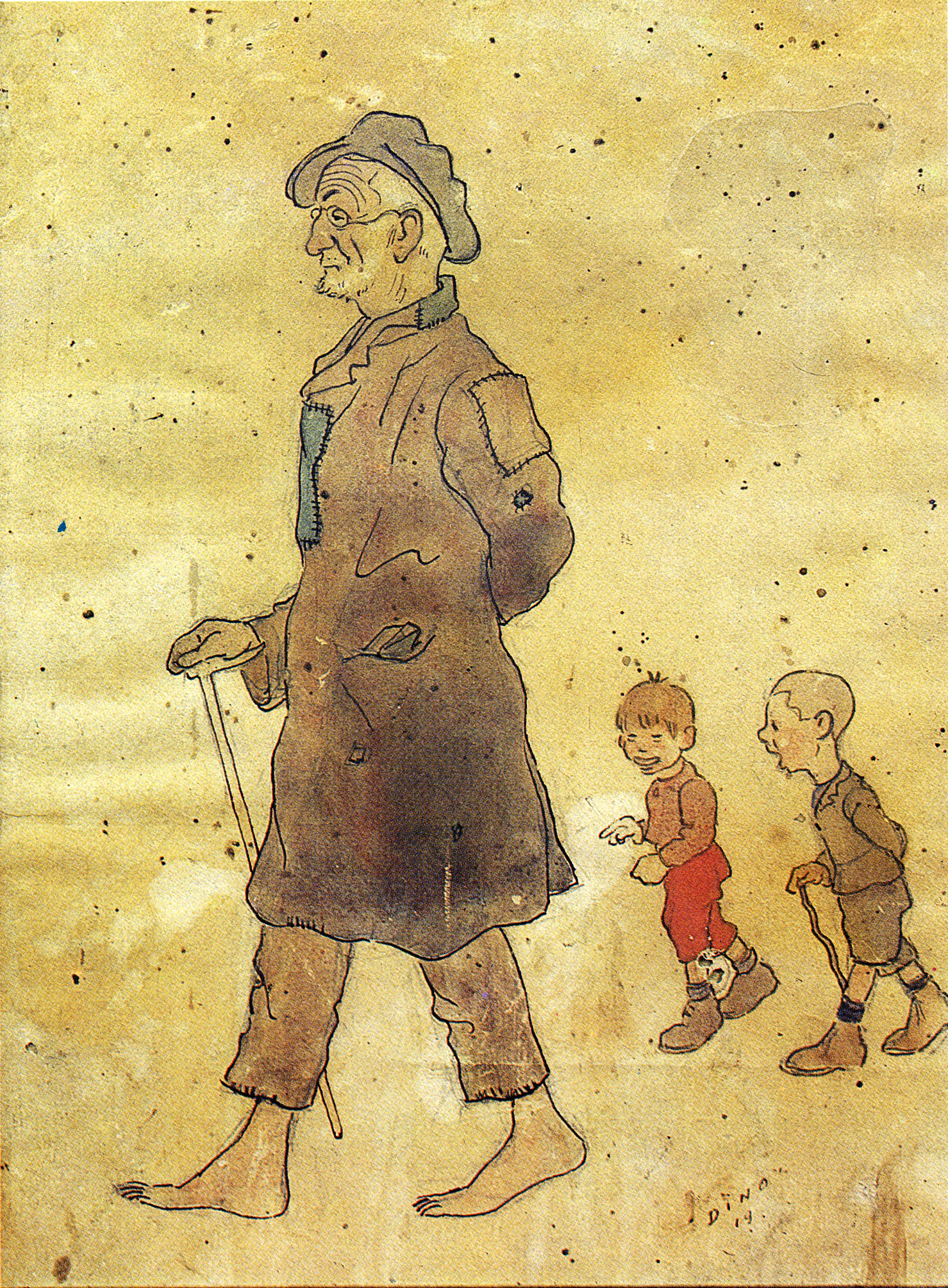
Manos (1919)

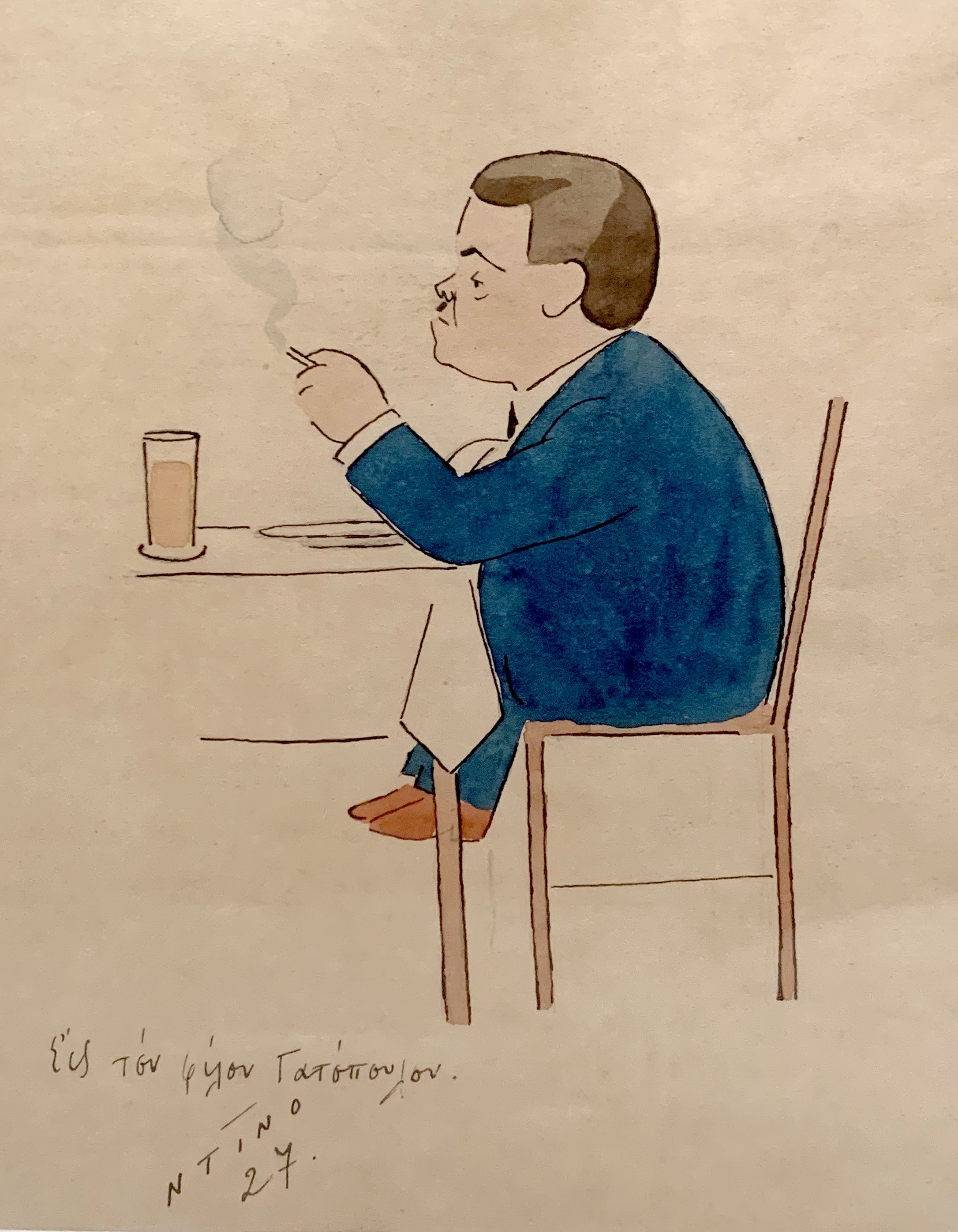
Dimitris Gatopoulos (1927)
