= Abidin Dino =

Turkish artist (1913–1993)

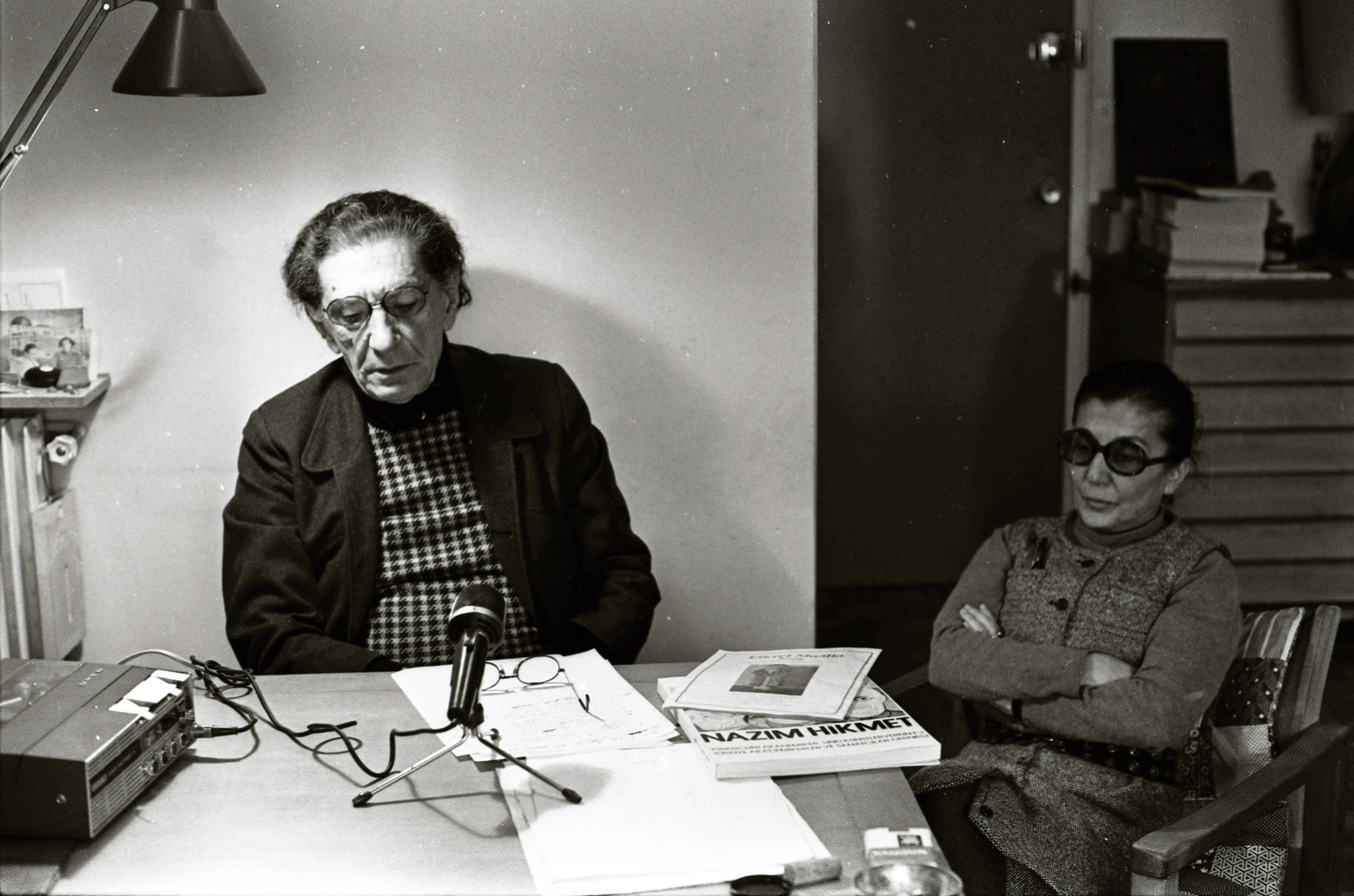
- Abidin Dino with Güzin Dino
- Born: Abidin Dino; 23 March 1913; Istanbul, Ottoman Empire
- Died: 7 December 1993 (aged 80); Paris, France
- Known for: Painting
- Spouse: Güzin Dino

Abidin Dino (23 March 1913 – 7 December 1993) was a Turkish artist and a well-known painter.

== Early life ==
Dino was born on 23 March 1913 in Istanbul into an art-loving family. He was grandchild of Abidin Pasha Dino (he is named after him), an Albanian Ottoman diplomat from the region of Preveza, Chameria and his father was Rasih Dino. His siblings were Ali Dino, famous cartoonist and member of the Hellenic Parliament, Leyla Dino Ileri, and Ahmet Dino (named after his great grandfather Ahmed Dino). He started drawing and painting at a young age influenced by his family. As a child he lived in Geneva, Switzerland and France for several years with his parents, returning to Istanbul in 1925. Dino began his secondary education at the American high school Robert College of Istanbul, but dropped out to devote himself to painting, drawing and writing. His articles and cartoons were soon being published in newspapers and magazines, and in 1933 he and five other young innovative painters founded the “D Group”, which held several exhibitions of their work. At around the same time, he illustrated Nazım Hikmet’s books of poetry.

In 1933, the Soviet director Sergei Yutkevich, who had made a film about Ankara, invited Dino to the Lenfil Studios in Leningrad, and with Atatürk's encouragement Dino accepted. In Leningrad, he worked as a scenery designer and assistant director at several film studios, and directed a film called "Miners" in Moscow, Kiev and Odessa. Shortly after returning to Turkey, he went to Paris, France, where he worked from 1937 to 1939, meeting such famous artists as Gertrude Stein, Tristan Tzara and Picasso.

Following his return to Istanbul again, he participated in the famous "Harbour Exhibition", consisting of paintings of the city's dockworkers and fishermen by well-known Turkish painters of the time. The exhibition aroused widespread public interest, and that year Dino was asked to design the Turkish pavilion at the 1939 New York World's Fair. Meanwhile, he published articles and cartoons in several of the foremost magazines of that time, studying a new approach to realism together with his elder brother poet Arif Dino.

During World War II, he did drawings inspired by the conflict, but his treatment of political subjects in wartime incurred official displeasure, and in 1941 the martial law command of Istanbul exiled him and his elder brother to southeastern Anatolia, where their grandfather had been a governor before. These years of exile until 1945 were artistically very productive for Dino. While his young wife Güzin Dino taught French at Adana High School, he worked for a local newspaper, TurkSozu, producing articles and drawings that illustrated with poetic realism of the hard lives and working conditions of agricultural labourers in the region. It was here that he wrote his plays "Bald" and "Heirs" and began doing sculpture. In 1951, he was allowed to leave Turkey. So, he went first to Rome, Italy, where he stayed nine months, but settled then in Paris in 1952.

== Paris days ==
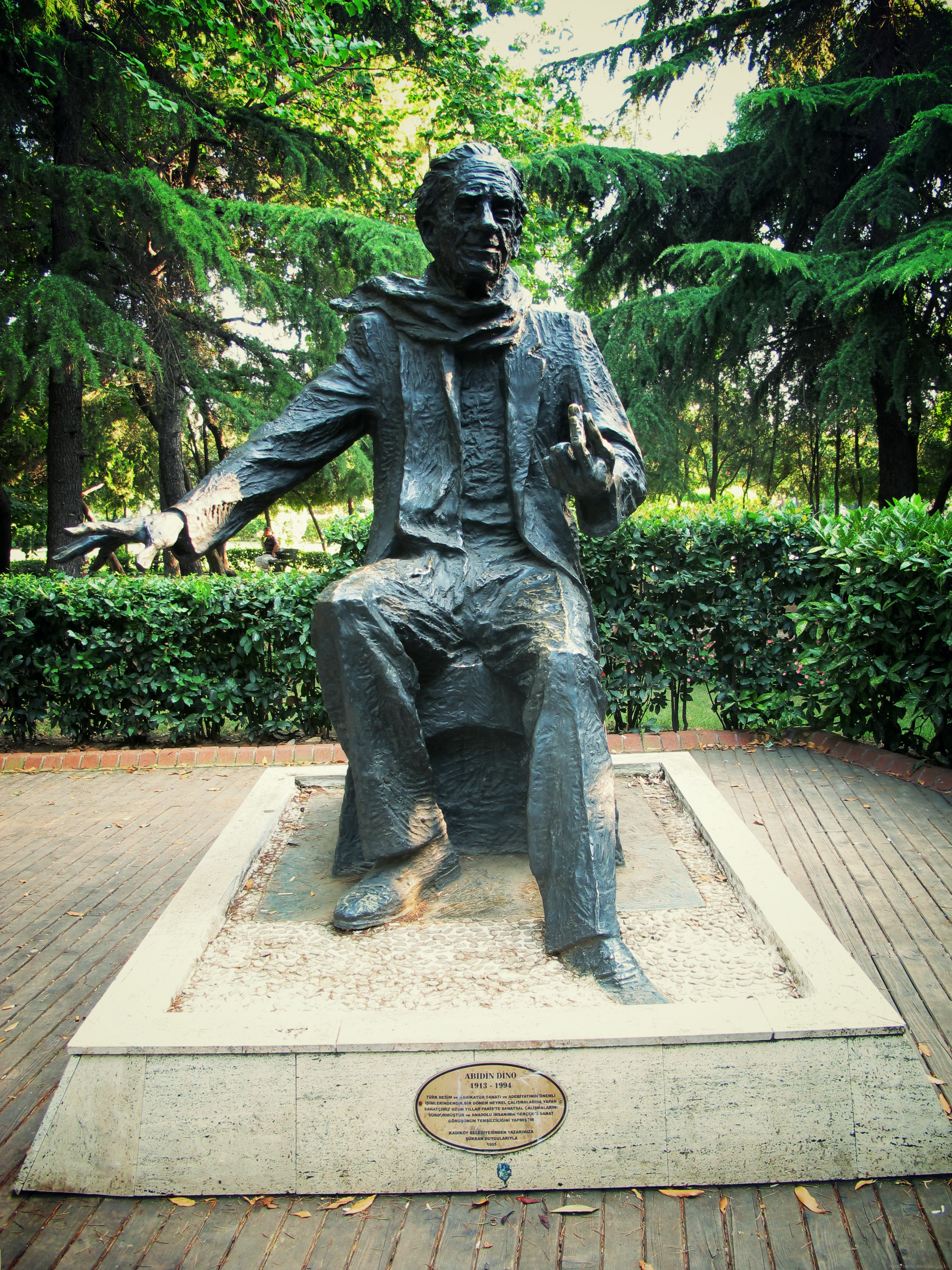
The statue of Dino in Özgürlük Parkı, Kadıköy, Istanbul

Within a short time, the home of Guzin and Abidin Dino in Paris became the haunt of many famous artists and writers. The couple first moved into the studio on the top floor of Max Ernst's apartment on the quay of Saint-Michel, and later to a small flat in L'Eure.

Their foreign and Turkish friends, including Nazım Hikmet, Yaşar Kemal, Ahmet Hamdi Tanpinar and Melih Cevdet, found the opportunity to meet one another at the Dino’s home. The Dinos encouraged young Turkish painters and students in Paris, introducing them to world-famous masters, and assisting them to get established.

For eight years from 1954, Abidin Dino participated in the "Salon de Mai" exhibitions in Paris, while Guzin Dino produced programmes for Radio France, taught Turkish at the Oriental Languages Department of the Sorbonne, and did French translations of Turkish literature.

Abidin Dino died in the Villejuif Hospital in Paris on 7 December 1993, at the age of 80. His body was brought to Istanbul and buried in the Aşiyan Cemetery.

== Unforgettable friendship ==
Although Abidin Dino lived abroad, he never severed relations with Turkey and his friends there, and took a close interest in everything that occurred, particularly in the political field. He was always delighted to cooperate with other artists and writers, writing prefaces and drawing illustrations for his friends' books with unbounded generosity.

After more than a decade's absence he visited Turkey in 1969 to open an exhibition of his work. From then on he came more frequently, participating in both one-person and mixed exhibitions. In 1979 he was elected honorary president of the National Union of the Visual Arts (UNAP) in France. His film "Goal! World Cup 1966" (1966) was a spectacular tribute to his visual sensitivity and brought him the "Flaherty prize". This film about the 1966 World Cup final is a documentary that did not confine itself to football matches, but included fascinating footage of people in London and elsewhere in England.

== Master of drawing ==
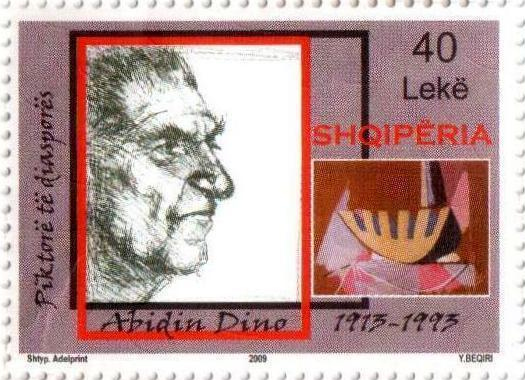
Dino on a 2009 stamp of Albania

Abidin Dino was interested in everything that was alive, skilfully capturing images with his brush, pencil and camera. He had two favourite themes: hands and flowers. In a book of small drawings, which he did for his wife Guzin published on the tenth anniversary of his death, glimpses of the love and sense of solidarity are seen, which were his inspiration. Entitled "Guzin's Abidins", this book consists of drawings and essays by Abidin Dino.

== See also ==
- List of Turkish painters
