= Frits Thors =

Dutch journalist and news anchor

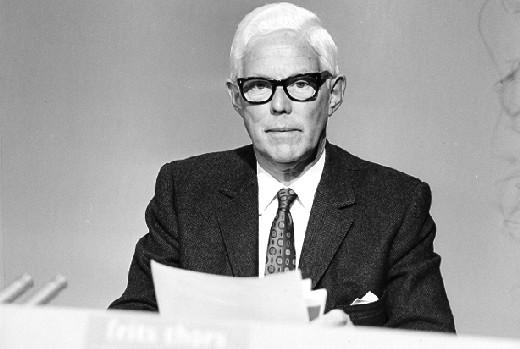
- Born: 13 September 1909; Amsterdam, Netherlands
- Died: 19 April 2014 (aged 104); Laren, Netherlands
- Occupations: Television and news anchor
- Notable credit(s): NTS Journaal; RNW; AVRO

Alexander Frederik Paul "Frits" Thors (13 September 1909 – 19 April 2014) was a Dutch journalist and news anchor. Thors was best known as the newscaster of the NTS-Journaal from 1965 until 1972.

== Biography ==
Prior to the NTS-Journaal, he had already had a long career as a radio presenter for the AVRO. He made his microphone debut in 1928. During World War II he was one of the few broadcasting employees who did not want to work for the Nazi Germany Propaganda broadcasting service in the Netherlands. In 1944 and 1945 he worked for Radio Herrijzend Nederland (Radio Recovering Netherlands) which broadcast from the already liberated south of the Netherlands. From 1946 on he worked as a freelance journalist for the Canadian broadcaster CBC (1946 to 1948 in Montreal) and the Dutch Wereldomroep.

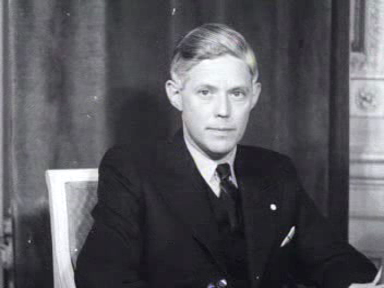
Thors in 1946

For his 100th birthday on 13 September 2009 the Dutch broadcasting network NOS visited him for a NOS news item at his home. In an interview with NOS-reporter Peer Ulijn Thors appeared extraordinarily clear of spirit. Thors was not very fond of publicity in his later years, but he did attend the presentation of a book honouring the Netherlands' most famous newscasters of the NTS-Journaal in October 2012; Thors was 103 at the time.

== See also ==
- List of centenarians (authors, poets and journalists)
