= Claire Martin (writer) =

Canadian writer

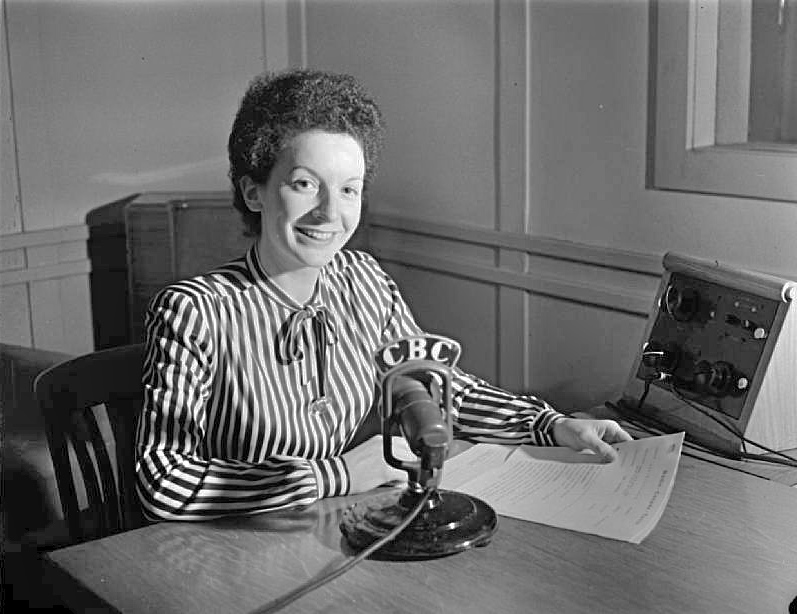
- Martin in 1945
- Born: Claire Montreuil; 18 April 1914; Quebec City, Quebec, Canada
- Died: 18 June 2014 (aged 100); Quebec, Canada
- Writing career
- Pen name: Claire Martin

Claire Martin, CC OQ FRSC (18 April 1914 – 18 June 2014) was the pseudonym of the Canadian writer Claire Montreuil. She wrote mainly in French. Her novels often have themes of women's liberation and erotic relationships. Martin frequently revealed her devotions toward the "Frenchness" and Quebec nationalism as saying "I prefer to be of Quebec." or "I feel closer to love as a French-Canadian." In her works, Quebec and French-Canadian are portrayed as well-educated and living well. Martin focused her writing style on risks and illnesses of love, and wrote with prejudice and social conventions. Her works are characterized by purity and crafty use of language.

== Early life and education ==
Martin (Claire Montreuil) was born in Quebec City, Quebec. She was educated at the Ursuline convent and by the Dames de la Congrégation. According to her interview with Winnipeg Free Press, it is said that her father gave negative influence on her childhood being against education for girls and expressing the hatred toward women.

== Career ==
In 1945 Martin lived in Ottawa and became a writer in residence at the University of Ottawa. Her first novel, Avec ou sans amour, was published in 1958. Her next two novels, the psychological thriller Doux-amer in 1960 and Quand j'aurai payé ton visage in 1962 were praised for elegant use of language. The latter was translated into English and published as The Legacy.

In 1965 she published her two-volume autobiography, Dan un gant de fer.

In 1970 she published her final novel, Les Morts.

In 1972 Martin left the university, and lived in France until 1982, when she returned to Quebec.

In 2014 she celebrated her 100th birthday on 18 April and died on 18 June.

== Honours ==
A Fellow of the Royal Society of Canada, Martin was made an Officer of the Order of Canada in 1984 in recognition for being "one of the most important writers of her generation in Canada". She was promoted to Companion in 2001. She was made an Officer of the National Order of Quebec in 2007. She won the Prix du Cercle du livre de France in 1958 for her first book Avec ou sans amour. She won the Prix France-Québec and the Governor General's Literary Award for Fiction (French) for her autobiographical books Dans un gant de fer (1965) and La joue droite (1966), respectively. Her final novel, Les Morts (1970), was adapted and shown at the Théâtre du Rideau Vert in 1972.

== Selected bibliography ==
- Avec ou sans amour (With or Without Love), 1958 - A book of short stories and two novels
- Doux-amer, 1960
- Quand j'aurai payé ton visage, 1962
- Dans un gant de fer (In an Iron Glove), 1965 - The first volume of her autobiography, about her family life and convent school days in her native Quebec city
- La joue droite (The Right Cheek), September 1966 (winner of a 1966 Governor General's Award) - The second volume of her autobiography
- Les Morts, 1970
- La petite fille lit, 1973
- Toute la vie, 1999
- L'amour impuni, 2000
- La brigande, 2001
- Il s'appelait Thomas, 2003

== See also ==
- List of centenarians (authors, poets and journalists)
