= Party of the Chameria =

The Party of the Chameria (Albanian: Partia e Çamërisë, Greek: Κόμμα της Τσαμουρίας) was a small, short-lived political party in Greece, which aimed to represent the Cham Albanians in the Greek Parliament. It was created by Ali Dino, a famous cartoonist and MP.

== 1926 elections ==
The party took part only in the 1926 general elections, gathering 1,539 votes from the Preveza and Ioannina prefectures. In the subsequent elections, the party did not gain the support of the local Albanian population and Ali Dino ran under Farmer-Labor ticket, gaining only 67 votes in 1932.

== See also ==
- Cham Albanians
- Party for Justice and Unity
- Party for Justice and Integration
- Cham issue
