= Dino Radoš =

Croatian basketball player

No. 12 – Đakovo
- Position: Power forward
- League: Prva muška liga

Personal information
- Born: 1 October 1991 (age 35) Osijek, Croatia
- Listed height: 2.03 m (6 ft 8 in)

Career information
- NBA draft: 2013: undrafted
- Playing career: 2007–present

Career history
- 2007–2013: Osječki sokol
- 2014: Vrijednosnice Osijek
- 2014–2016: Zagreb
- 2016: Hermes Analitica
- 2017: Velika Gorica
- 2017–2018: Alkar
- 2018: Borovo
- 2018–2021: Vardar
- 2022: Jazine Arbanasi
- 2023–: Đakovo

Dino Radoš (born 1 October 1991) is a Croatian professional basketball player.
