= Dino Esposito =

Italian consultant

- Born: 4 May 1965 (age 60)

Dino Esposito is an Italian consultant and the author of several .NET books published by Microsoft Press. Based in Italy, Dino is a frequent speaker at industry events worldwide.

In the May 2006 edition of Microsoft's Developer Network (MSDN) Magazine, Dino made his 100th consecutive installment to the column called "Cutting Edge". He has been writing this column since January 1998 in Microsoft Internet Developer (MIND) – which in March 2000 merged with Microsoft Systems Journal (MSJ) to form MSDN Magazine. He is also a frequent contributor to Dr. Dobb's, where he writes primarily about programming with Microsoft Web technologies, especially ASP.NET and ASP.NET MVC. Dino has also written regularly for Simple-Talk for several years on ASP.NET with over sixty articles to his credit.
