= Dino Valls =

Spanish painter (born 1959)

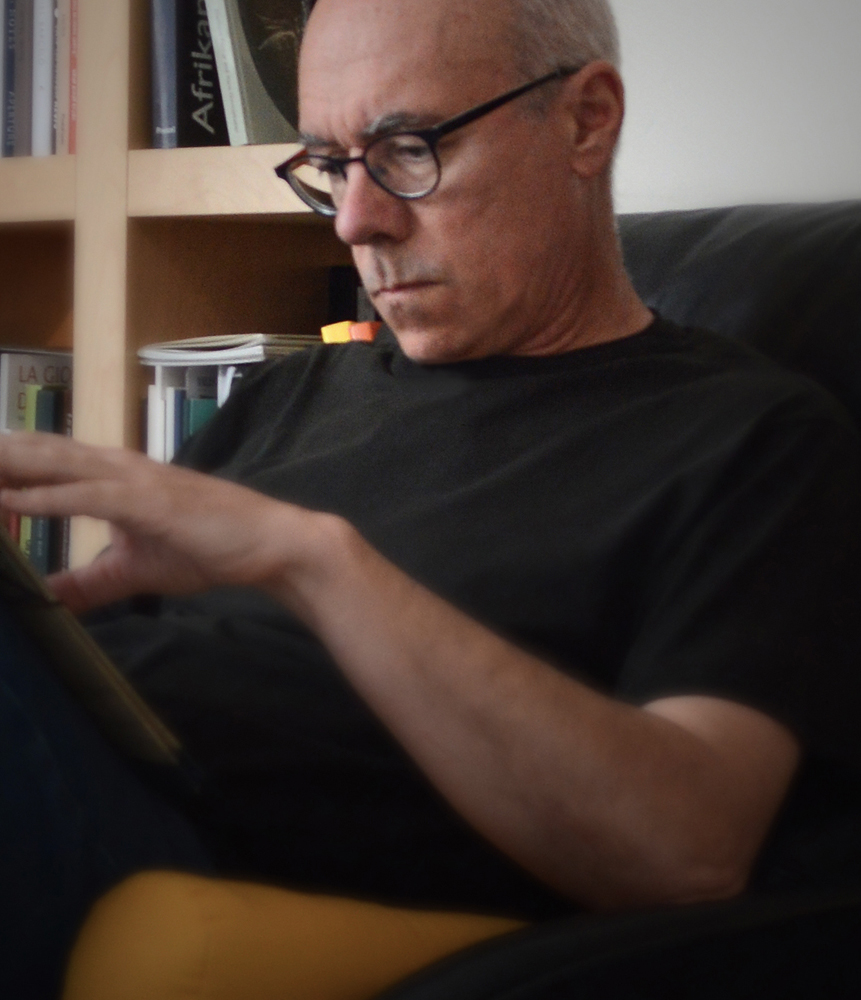
- Valls in 2017
- Born: 1959; Zaragoza, Spain
- Education: Faculty of Medicine, University of Zaragoza
- Occupation: Painter
- Website: www.dinovalls.com

Dino Valls is a Spanish painter born in 1959 in Zaragoza.

Building on a childhood passion for drawing, Valls taught himself to paint in oils beginning in 1975. After completing his degree in Medicine and Surgery in 1982, Valls devoted himself full-time to the profession of painting.

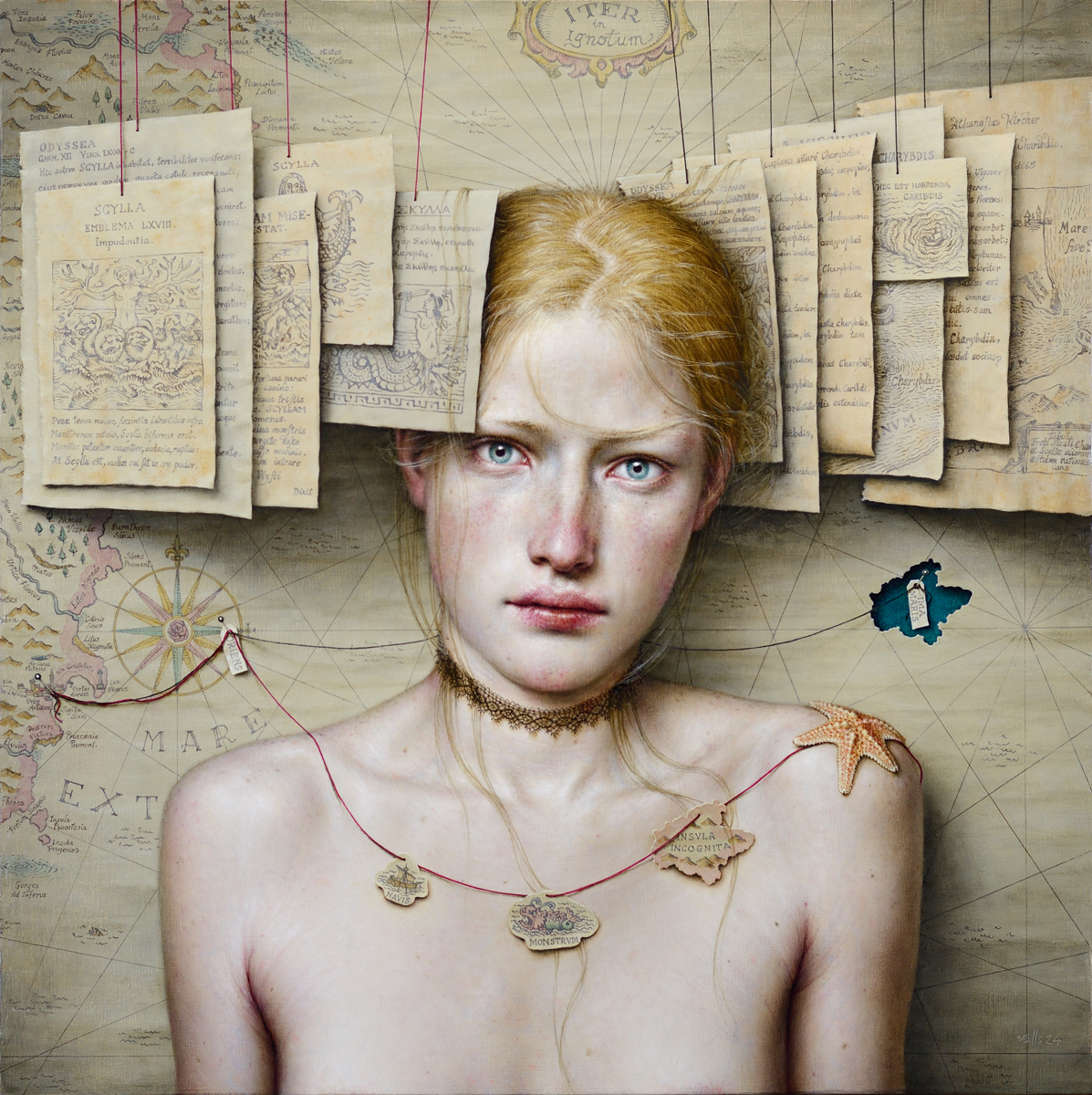
ITER (Dino Valls, oil on wood, 50 x 50 cm. 2024)

As one of the Spanish representatives of the vanguard of figurative art, Valls' work displays the strong influence of past masters and their studies of the human being. In the early '90s, Valls began studying the use of egg tempera, adapting and customizing the techniques of Italian and Flemish masters from the fifteenth to seventeenth centuries to create new works in combinations of tempera and oil. His paintings elaborate and expand upon the methods of past masters, employing formal figurative techniques as the medium through which to explore the human psyche in a conceptual framework laden with profound psychological weight and symbolism.

Valls has participated in important international exhibitions of contemporary art, and has held numerous showings in Europe and the United States.
