= Güzin Dino =

Turkish linguist, translator

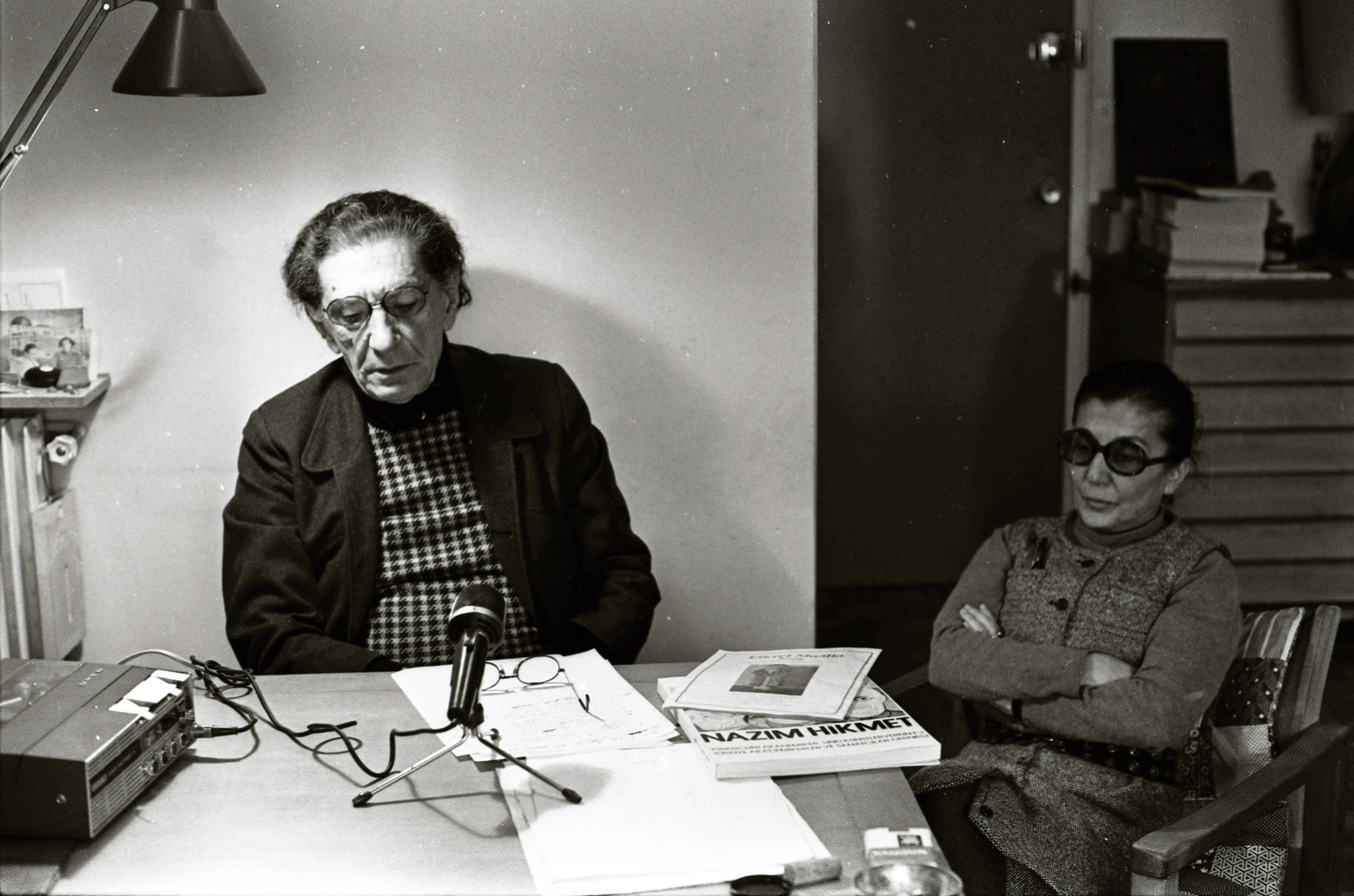
- Güzin Dino with Abidin Dino
- Born: 1910
- Died: 30 May 2013 (aged 102); Paris, France
- Occupations: Linguist, translator, writer
- Spouse: Abidin Dino (married 1943-1993)

Güzin Dino (1910 – May 30, 2013) was a Turkish literary scholar, linguist, translator and writer. She is known for writing from a Marxist perspective. She was married to the painter Abidin Dino (1913–1993).

Güzin and Abidin Dino married in 1943 in Adana, Turkey. Abidin was a member of the Turkish Communist Party, who was exiled to the southern Turkish city. Subject to political pressure and prosecution, Abidin left Turkey in 1952 to settle in Paris, France. She followed her husband to France in 1954.

The couple toured many places across France with sanatoriums due to Abidin's illness. They settled in Saint-Michel in the 5th arrondissement of Paris, where Turkish intellectuals used to reside. Finally, the couple moved into a painter workshop in Rue de l'Eure.

Güzin Dino worked in the French National Centre for Scientific Research (CNRS) and was an instructor at the Institut national des langues et civilisations orientales (INALCO). By translating the works of the poet Nazım Hikmet and the writer Yaşar Kemal into French language, she introduced Turkish literature into France. Her translations were published by many renowned publishing houses, and her essays found positive interest in French and American journals. She also served many years as the head of the Turkish language section of the Radio France Internationale (RFI).

Their home became a meeting point for intellectuals and artists from Turkey. She did not leave her husband alone during the time of hardship and her husband's illness. Güzin Dino continued to live her entire life alone in this house after Abidin's death from throat cancer in 1993. Telling about her life with Abidin Dino, the Turkish policy and the memories with Nazım Hikmet to the younger generations, she used to lament that "That country never showed respect and dignity for its valued citizens".

Güzin Dino was hospitalized because she fell three times in a week. She died at the age of 102 on the May 30, 2013.

== See also ==
- List of centenarians (authors, poets and journalists)
