= Eleanor Owen =

American journalist, professor, actress and mental health professional (1921–2022)

- Born: Eleanor Elizabeth DeVito; January 22, 1921; Brooklyn, New York, U.S.
- Died: February 6, 2022 (aged 101); Seattle, Washington, U.S.
- Occupations: Professor of Dramatic Arts, mental health professional, theatre actress, journalist
- Known for: Co-founder of the National Alliance for the Mentally Ill
- Spouse: John Owen (m. 1952)
- Children: 2

Eleanor Owen (January 22, 1921 – February 6, 2022), also known as Eleanor DeVito, was an American journalist, playwright, university professor, costume designer, theatre actress, and mental health professional. She received statewide and national honors and awards for her advocacy work on behalf of families and individuals with mental illness. Serving as an advocate in Olympia, Washington, Owen participated in the introduction and successful passage of health and human services legislation.

In 1978, she founded the Washington Advocates for the Mentally Ill and the following year in Wisconsin, she co-founded the National Alliance for the Mentally Ill (NAMI), which is the largest public initiative in the US that works to support families and individuals facing mental health difficulties. The organization encompasses over 1,200 affiliates at the regional, state, and federal level in every geographical region throughout the US. Offices can also be found in Puerto Rico, the Virgin Islands, and Canada.

In 1999, King County Executive and Deputy Secretary of the United States Department of Housing and Urban Development, Ron Sims, honored her with the Lifetime Achievement Award at the King County Mental Health Exemplary Service Awards. In 2000, she received the Jefferson Award from the Seattle Post-Intelligencer for her advocacy work on behalf of individuals and families affected by mental illness.

== Early life ==
Eleanor Elizabeth DeVito was born on January 22, 1921, in Brooklyn, New York City. She was the third of eight children and eldest daughter of Charles Francis "Frank" and Elvira "Abirone" (née Mazzatenda) DeVito, Italian immigrants from Chieti, Italy. Her siblings included brothers Francis, Albert, and Charles; and sisters Mildred (Starin), Gloria (Freer), Genevieve (Glynn), and Evelyn (Carbone).

When she was a young child, the DeVito family moved to Balmville, a small hamlet overlooking the Hudson River in upstate New York. The DeVito children attended school together in a small, three-room school house. Following an academic assessment in elementary school, Eleanor advanced a couple of levels, graduating early.

In summer 1936, DeVito was responsible for the care of her younger siblings and decided to take them all to a local swimming hole to cool off. She parked the car on the far side of the railroad tracks from the water. After a day of enjoyment, she called for each child to jump in the car for the drive home and honked the car horn, hoping they would hurry along. Unbeknownst to her, a train was coming. Her six-year-old brother, Charles, was killed instantly while crossing the railroad tracks. "It took me a long time to accept the fact that I was responsible for that, but it did happen, and I had to come to terms with it."

=== Educational background ===
When Owen was 16 years old, she graduated from Newburgh Free Academy. Her goals included attending nursing school following high school. While she successfully passed the entrance exam, she was not allowed to enroll in the nursing school, due to policy that only accepted new students aged 17 and older.

Once she turned 17, Owen briefly studied nursing at Mount Saint Mary College (MSMC), before enrolling at the American Academy of Dramatic Arts (AADA), where she focused on acting and costume design. After graduation from the AADA, she studied journalism at Columbia University, followed by a stint as a junior reporter for Newburgh Daily News, earning $17 per week.

After relocating to Washington, she earned two degrees at the University of Washington, including a Bachelor of Arts in Social Welfare and a Master's degree in Educational Psychology.

== Professional background ==
Following her graduation from the AADA, Owen moved back to New York City, this time to Greenwich Village, where she sewed costumes for school performances and local dance troupes. In 1947, she worked with Roxanne Marden designing costumes for Columbia University's performance of Lion About Dance, which was part of the Modern Dance Recital presented by the Philolexian Society at the Brander Matthews Theater. In 1953, she served as the costume designer for Fred Berk's Merry-Go-Rounders Dance Company's dance production of Holiday in Israel which was performed at the Teresa L. Kaufman Auditorium in New York City.

She spent two summers working in summer stock theatre in Orange, New Jersey. She also appeared in the Broadway production of As You Like It and toured with the production of Life with Father, in which she portrayed Annie. She appeared in the off-Broadway production of The Year of Pilar.

In addition to performing in different theatrical productions, she also directed children's plays for the New York Children's Theatre Company. She appeared in the theatrical adaptation of the film, Aladdin and His Lamp, portraying three different roles, including Alladin, the princess, and the mother. She became known for her work in theatre and dance costume design in New York City. Clients included the Merce Cunningham Dance Company at Black Mountain College, headed by world-renowned dancer and choreographer, Merce Cunningham.

Moving from New York to Kennewick, she worked with the Richland Light Opera Company, serving as staging director for several productions, including Victor Herbert's The Red Mill. She has also worked with the Spokane Children's Theatre, where she has facilitated acting workshops for the Children's Theatre Festival, in partnership with the San Francisco Magic Carpet Players.

When the family moved from Kennewick to Seattle in 1955, she continued her work in costuming by creating displays for Frederick & Nelson and The Bon Marché. She also joined the writing staff of the Seattle Post-Intelligencer, as well as the faculty of Lakeside School, where she taught anthropology and drama. She later joined the staff at the University of Washington School of Drama, serving as associate professor.

== Legislative advocacy ==
In 1978, Owen established the Washington Advocates for the Mentally Ill (WAMI), which advocates for families and individuals facing mental health crises. The following year, she co-founded the National Alliance on Mental Illness (NAMI), which provides support, education, and advocacy at the regional, state and federal level, with over 1,200 offices throughout the US, as well as in Washington, D.C., Puerto Rico, Canada, and the Virgin Islands.

Owen served as the president and executive director of WAMI, now known as NAMI Greater Seattle office from 1978 to 2002. As executive director of NAMI Greater Seattle, Owen was directly involved in advocating for sweeping changes in mental health legislation in Washington State, including a law introduced and passed in the 1970s that allows involuntary confinement and treatment of individuals whose mental illness makes them a grave threat to themselves or others. She drafted the language in RCW 71.05 to include "grave disability due to mental illness" as criteria for a 72-hour evaluation for Involuntary Treatment.

Owen made her presence known during the 1989 legislative session. In the Washington State House of Representatives and Senate, she is known as "The Barracuda" for her advocacy efforts. In 2002, she ran for election to the 43rd district of the Washington State House of Representatives, but was defeated by Frank Chopp. Undeterred, she remained a key player and advocate on passing a bipartisan, $65 million strategic plan to restructure the strategic plan and priorities of the Washington State Department of Social and Health Services and the State's Mental Health Division. Retired King County Superior Court Judge Janice Niemi recalls Owen as a catalyst in the successful passage of the bill, "You can't really pass a comprehensive bill like this without what you might call a 'bulldog', and that was Eleanor."

== Personal life and death ==
In 1952, DeVito married John Lewis Owen in Kennewick, Washington. Together, they had two children, Susan and John, Jr. In 1955, the Owen family relocated to Seattle, when John accepted an engineering position with the Boeing Company.

Owen was passionate in her advocacy work due to the illness of her son, John, Jr., known as "Jody". In 1974, he was hospitalized and diagnosed with schizophrenia. The illness manifested through threatening voices that terrified her son, causing him to withdraw. At times, he became catatonic, curling up into a ball. He also developed an involuntary movement disorder that manifested as uncontrolled movement in his upper body and limbs. Owen has stated that her son "was hibernating. He was living in a box in the basement. Then he made a noose and hung it up". When she found the noose, she became determined to do everything she could to help her son. When he was 21 years old, Jody was arrested for killing a man in a bar. When the prosecutor and attorney agreed to accept an insanity plea, he was sent to Western State Hospital for six years.

In 2011, Seattle Times reporter Maureen O'Hagan wrote an article about Owen, entitled "Eleanor Owen's tireless battle for mental-health care", which was featured in the Seattle Times' Pacific Northwest Magazine. Referring to Owen as a "local legend", O'Hagan provided an in-depth look at Owen's life which included the background of her son's early descent into schizophrenia, which manifested in suicidal ideation and eventual murder of a man in a local bar. In response, she began working to address the stigma and lack of services for families and individuals living with mental illness. She was known on a national level for her advocacy work and insight into practical and effective ways to work toward recovery from schizophrenia and reformation of the societal view of victims and families experiencing mental illness in their lives.

The Pacific Northwest Magazine article about Owen received praise from the Washington State Coalition to Improve Mental Health Reporting. On June 10, 2011, O'Hagan was presented with the Washington State 2010–2011 Mental Health Reporting Award. In honor of O'Hagan, University of Washington professor of journalism, Roger Simpson stated that "Maureen O'Hagan's profile of Eleanor Owens (sic) directs attention to the importance of engaging passionately with the mental health system in the broadest sense, from state agencies to pharmaceutical companies, while staying focused, as a good story does, on the dynamic woman at its center." In response to receiving the award, O'Hagan stated

We set out to write a profile of Eleanor because she has a long and interesting history with the mental health system—and because she's such a personality, to boot. But it was her son Jody who quietly provided what we considered to be some of the most valuable insights. Through this very personal story, we were able to write about larger issues that have touched so many lives. We're truly honored to have this work recognized.

When she turned 90 years of age, Owen announced that she started writing her memoir, which includes stories of surviving a "chaotic Italian immigrant family" during the Depression. Her memoir was published under the title The Gone Room in January 2022.

Owen died in Seattle on February 6, 2022, at the age of 101.

== Honors and awards ==
- Jefferson Award for Outstanding Community Service (1980, 2000)
- President's Volunteer Action Award Nominee (1982 and 1983)
- Matrix Table Award from Women in Communications, Inc. (1985)
- Lifetime Achievement Award, Mental Health Exemplary Service Awards (October 4, 1999)
- National Alliance on Mental Illness (NAMI) Most Outstanding Advocate Award (2000)
- "Eleanor Owen Day" in King County, Washington (July 12, 2002)

== Board memberships ==
- 1978–2001: founder and executive director, Washington Advocates for the Mentally Ill
- 1979: co-founder, National Alliance for the Mentally Ill
- 1984–1990: member and chair, King County Mental Health Advisory Board
- 1996–20??: president, Mental Health Association of Washington
- 1997–20??: co-founder and member, Coalition for Insurance Parity
- 1998–20??: executive committee member, DSHS Title XIX Advisory Committee
- 2001: wrote, edited, and published 11 editions of "Connections, a Self-Help and Resource Guide for Individuals With Mental Illness, Their Families and Social Service Professionals"
- As of 2012: member and co-chair, Legislative Advocacy Committee, King County Mental Health Advisory Board
