= Dino Claudio Sanchez =

Dino Claudio M. Sanchez is a Filipino politician who served as vice mayor of Butuan from 2007 to 2010. He was also a former councilor before winning the vice-mayoralty position in the May 2007 elections. He comes from a family with a long history of public service.

A graduate of San Beda College, Sanchez is a wide reader of books on public administration, philosophy, World Wars I and II, international parliamentary structures and world history. He is fluent in English, Tagalog, Cebuano and Butuanon dialects.
