= Dino Ramic =

American soccer player

Dino Ramić
Personal information
- Date of birth: December 31, 1988 (age 37)
- Place of birth: Mostar, Bosnia and Herzegovina
- Position: Forward

Youth career
- –2008: Hanford High School

College career
Years	Team	Apps	(Gls)
2008–2012	Clarke University	61	(40)

Senior career*
Years	Team	Apps	(Gls)
2015–2016	Highlands Park F.C.	9	(3)
- * Club domestic league appearances and goals

Dino Ramić (born December 31, 1988) is an American soccer player who last played for Highlands Park F.C. of the South African National First Division. He was known for his speed, footwork and goalscoring ability during his time at Clarke University, playing a key role in the team's success.

== Early life ==
Beginning football when he was 3, Ramić immigrated with his family aged 8 to the United States in 1997 due to the Bosnian War, a conflict that had lasting reverberations around the area.

== Career ==
=== South Africa ===
Wearing South African National First Division competitors Highlands Park F.C.'s colors in 2015–16, Ramic tallied nine appearances there, scoring a header when his team beat African Warriors 3-0 and getting a brace in another 3–0 victory, this time over Thanda Royal Zulu. The forward started training with Highlands Park in late 2014, with the club waiting for his work permit.

== Personal life ==
Ramić was born on December 31, 1988, in Mostar, SR Bosnia and Herzegovina to Hajrudin and Sabina Ramić and has one sister, Arna Ramić. With his grandfather and father having professional football experience in Bosnia, Ramić's mother's cousin is former footballer and current sporting director of FC Bayern Munich Hasan Salihamidžić.

== Honors ==
=== High school ===
- Hanford High School Rookie of the Year(1)
- Hanford High School Golden Boot Award(2)
- first-team All-Mid-Valley Conference(2)
- State team class 3A(1)

=== College ===
- MCC Newcomer of the Year(1): 2008
- Most game-winning goals (5) and shots per game (3.61) in college soccer history- 2010
- MCC All-Conference Honorable Mention(1): 2010
- MCC Offensive Player of the Week(2): 2011
- NAIA All-American Honorable Mention(1): 2011
- MCC first-team All-Conference(1): 2008, 2011, 2012
- Most goals scored in Clarke college soccer career
