= Dino Bergens =

Dutch-Surinamese basketball player

Personal information
- Born: August 31, 1969 (age 57) Paramaribo, Suriname
- Listed height: 1.82 m (6 ft 0 in)

Career information
- Playing career: 1987–2006
- Position: Point guard
- Number: 4, 11, 10

Career history
- see text

Dino Bergens (born August 31, 1969 in Paramaribo, Suriname) is a Dutch-Surinamese retired professional basketball player who played for various Eredivisie teams from the late 1980s into the 2000s.

== Career ==
- Nashua Den Bosch 1987-1990
- Festo BVV 1990-1991
- Donar Groningen 1991-1994
- Den Bosch 1994-1997
- De Dunckers 1997-1998
- BC Omniworld 2003-2006.

In 2022, Bergens was youth coach of BC Apollo
