= Dino Sanlorenzo =

Italian politician (1930–2020)

Dino Sanlorenzo (May 22, 1930 – December 5, 2020) was an Italian politician, and a member of the Italian Communist Party. He was President of the regional Council in Piedmont from 1975 until 1980 and later deputy president of the Region till 1983. He was a member of the Italian Parliament in Rome from 1983 till 1987, and was a member of the foreign policy commission.

During the years he held office, the Italian Communist Party was divided on the issue of terrorism, with some members supporting and some members condemning far-left terrorism. Sanlorenzo was a strong defender of the democratic system, who opposed both far-left and far-right terrorism. Within the Communist Party, he was one of the first to condemn far-left terrorism, taking a stance against the Marxist–Leninist groups. He led the fight against terrorism groups in Piedmont, Prima Linea and Red Brigades. He collaborated with other members of the Italian Communist Party, such as Giancarlo Paietta, Piero Fassino and Diego Novelli, in pursuing this policy.

== Activity ==
Sanlorenzo never accepted the expression "comrades who do wrong" (Italian: Compagni che sbagliano). His stance against terrorism induced the terrorist organizations, on July 24, 1979, to publish in the newspaper a death sentence against him from Prima Linea. One terrorism group tried to carry out the death sentence, but a housemaid saw the armed group waiting for Sanlorenzo to return in his automobile and warned him. The ambush failed.

== See also ==
- Terrorism in Italy
- Years of lead (Italy) (1969-1989)
- Prima Linea
- Italian Communist Party
- Democrats of the Left

== Bibliography ==
- Libro: Gli anni spietati Autore: Sanlorenzo Dino—Editore: Edizioni Associate—data publ.: 1989
- Libro: Noi cominciammo così... 120 esponenti della vita politica di Torino raccontano le radici della loro scelta a Sinistra - Autore: Sanlorenzo Dino - Editore: The C' Comunicazione - Argomento: torino-politica, sinistra politica—Genere: scienza politica data publ.: 1999
- Libro: Carlo Marletti; Francesco Bullo, Luciano Borghesan, Pier Paolo Benedetto, Roberto Tutino, Alberto de Sanctis, Anni di piombo. Il Piemonte e Torino alla prova del terrorismo, Soveria Mannelli, Rubbettino [2004], 2007. ISBN 978-88-498-1735-5 - One research sponsored from Consiglio Regionale del Piemonte about the fight against terrorism in Piemonte
