= Nils Elowsson =

Swedish journalist and politician

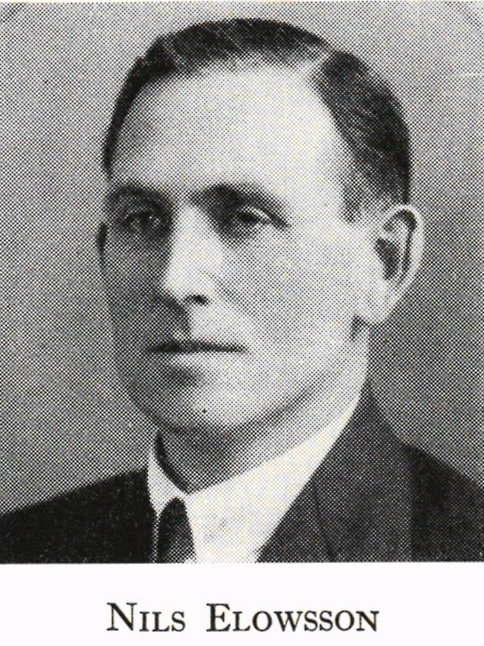
Image of Nils Elowsson

Nils Elowsson (23 October 1890 – 27 October 1999) was a Swedish politician and journalist. He was born in Kristianstad County, Sweden and died in Kristianstad aged 109.

== Career ==
Elowsson began his career as a journalist in 1917, and eventually became the editor of the Swedish newspaper Läns-Demokraten in 1932. The newspaper was closed down in 1957. He was a party member of the Swedish Social Democratic Party and a member of the Riksdag 1940–1963 (24 years). Aged 89 he became the author of a book called Det var på snapphanens tid. At the time of his death, four days after his 109th birthday, he was the oldest living man in Sweden.
