= Dino Stecher =

Swiss ice hockey player and coach

- Born: April 5, 1964 (age 60); Switzerland
- Height: 5 ft 10 in (178 cm)
- Weight: 172 lb (78 kg; 12 st 4 lb)
- Position: Goaltender
- Caught: Left
- Played for: EHC Olten; HC Fribourg-Gottéron; ZSC Lions
- National team: Switzerland
- NHL draft: Undrafted
- Playing career: 1982–1999

Dino Stecher (born April 5, 1964) is a Swiss ice hockey coach and former goaltender. He is formerly the head coach for EHC Basel of the Swiss National League B.

Stecher was named the 1993-94 National League A Goaltender of the Year.
