= Dino Phillips =

American adult film actor and model (1969–2025)

- Born: Dimitri Perparos; December 13, 1969; Chicago, Illinois, U.S.
- Died: October 26, 2025 (aged 55); Tempe, Arizona, U.S.
- Other names: Dino Philips; Dino Jordan; Dane Preston
- Occupations: Actor; Model; Dancer; Director
- Years active: 1992–2009
- Agent: Falcon Studios

Dimitri Perparos (December 13, 1969 – October 26, 2025), known professionally by his stage names Dino Phillips, Dino Jordan, and his directorial pseudonym Dane Preston, was an American adult film actor, director, and model. He was a prominent figure during the golden era of gay adult cinema in the 1990s and 2000s, performing for leading studios such as Catalina Video, Vivid Man, and All Worlds Video. Over a career spanning more than 15 years, he accrued over 60 on-camera credits, established a prominent print modeling career, and later transitioned into directing, while also becoming a recognized LGBTQ+ community volunteer and fundraiser in his later life.

== Early life ==
Perparos was born on December 13, 1969, in Chicago, Illinois. During his youth, he participated in competitive high school wrestling, an athletic background that would later influence his professional performance style.

By the early 1990s, Perparos relocated to the Southwest. In 1992, at the age of 23, he was working as a dancer at The Works, a popular nightclub in Phoenix, Arizona. During a live performance venue appearance by adult film director Chi Chi LaRue, LaRue discovered Perparos alongside fellow dancer Tyler Regan. Recognizing their screen potential, LaRue invited both men to San Francisco, California, immediately casting them in the adult release Hard Body II Video Magazine (1993), which marked Perparos' official entry into the adult entertainment industry.

== Career ==
=== Acting career and stylistic focus (1992–2009) ===
Performing primarily under the name Dino Phillips (and occasionally credited as Dino Jordan early in his career), Perparos quickly built a reputation for his athletic build, masculine screen presence, and wrestling background. This distinct athletic skill set led to frequent bookings with BG Enterprises, a studio specializing in athletic and wrestling-themed adult content.

Throughout the 1990s and 2000s, Phillips became a staple performer for the era's definitive gay adult entertainment studios, including Video 10, Vivid Man, HIS Video, Hot Desert Knights, All Worlds Video, and Catalina Video.

During his career, Phillips collaborated with many major performers of the era. He frequently cited performer Travis Colt as his favorite on-screen costar. His career also included high-profile, unreleased projects; he was hired by Studio2000 to film a featured scene for one of the Mavericks series films alongside top star Tom Katt. However, due to physical compatibility issues during production—which Phillips later noted was due to Katt's heavy thighs and thick build making choreography overly difficult—the scene was ultimately discarded from the final cut.

By the time of his retirement from on-camera performing in 2009, Dino was credited with over 61 on-camera performances.

=== Modeling and print media ===
In addition to his film career, Phillips was a highly sought-after print model during the 1990s. Renowned for his distinct handsome looks and a famously muscular, lean physique, he crossed over heavily into adult publishing. He appeared as a featured model in numerous high-profile nude magazines, gay publications, and erotica adult magazines throughout the decade. His print work significantly amplified his popularity, making his image widely recognizable beyond video releases and cementing his status as a prominent pin-up of the 1990s adult era.

=== Directorial (1999–2009) ===
In 1999, looking to expand his creative control and establish longevity in the industry, Phillips transitioned behind the camera. Adopting the directorial pseudonym Dane Preston, he began writing and directing feature-length films and vignette series.

For the next decade, he balanced his remaining on-camera roles with a prolific directorial output. Legacy studios such as Catalina Video and All Worlds Video heavily relied on his directorial work, trusting him to helm large-budget projects during the industry's critical technological transition from VHS to DVD format. He maintained his directorial and acting career concurrently until his formal retirement from the adult industry in 2009.

=== Later life and philanthropy ===
Following his complete retirement from the adult industry in 2009, Perparos stepped entirely out of the entertainment industry and resided primarily in West Hollywood, California, and Tempe, Arizona.

In his post-adult career, he became a respected within the West Hollywood LGBTQ+ community. Operating under his real name, Dimitri Perparos, he dedicated significant time to local advocacy, volunteering, and anchoring fundraisers. Industry peers and community organizers frequently noted his reputation as a supportive, gentle, and reliable community volunteer.

== Death ==
Perparos died unexpectedly at the age of 55 on October 26, 2025, in Tempe, Arizona. His passing prompted widespread tributes from former colleagues and community leaders, including his original mentor Chi Chi LaRue and performer Sabin Gray, who publicly commemorated his kindness, professional legacy, and extensive charitable contributions.

== Filmography ==
=== Film ===
Year	Title	Role	Notes
1992	Travelin' Wild	Dino	Debut
1993	Hard Body Video Magazine 2	Dino Phillips	
1994	The Cum-Back Kid	Dino Phillips	
1994	By Invitation Only	Dino Phillips	
1994	Come with Me	Dino Phillips	
1994	Please Don't Tell	Dino Phillips	
1994	Together Again	Dino Phillips	
1994	Too Damn Big!	Dino Phillips	
1994	Forever Hold Your Piece 1	Dino Phillips	
1994	Red, White, and You	Dino Phillips	
1994	X-Fights 11	Dino Phillips	
1995	How to Get a Man in Bed	Dino Phillips	
1995	Quick Study: Sex Ed 1	College Dean	
1995	Taxi Tales	Dino Phillips	
1995	Guest Services	Dino Phillips	
1995	Into Leather 1	Dino Phillips	
1995	Limited Entry	Dino Phillips	
1995	Hot Springs Orgy	Croquet Player	
1995	The Urge	Dino Phillips	
1995	The Watering Game	Dino Phillips	
1995	Smooth Strokes	Dino Phillips	
1995	The Night We Met	Dino Phillips	
1995	Hard Ball	Dino Phillips	
1995	Spankfest 1	Dino Phillips	
1995	Hard on Demand	Dino Phillips	
1995	Earning His Keep	Dino Phillips	
1995	Spring Fever	Dino Phillips	
1995	A Score of Sex: Johnny Rey's Sex Series 2	Dino Phillips	
1995	Keep the Tip	Dino Phillips	
1995	Alex's Leather Dream	Dino Phillips	
1995	Wet Warehouse 1	Dino Phillips	
1995	Right Hand Man	Dino Phillips	
1995	Gay Video Guide Porn Star Softball Game	Dino Phillips	
1995	Battling Briefs 4	Dino Phillips	
1996	In the Mix	Dino Phillips	
1996	Happily Ever After	Don	
1996	Big Rigs	Dino Phillips	
1996	Boys from Bel-Air	Neighbor	
1996	Hot Cops 2: This Time the Law's Gone Too Far	Dark-haired Prisoner Washing Van	
1996	A Night with Todd Stevens	Dino Phillips	
1996	I Wanna Be in Porn	Dino Phillips	
1996	Hard Lessons: Sex Ed 2	The Dean	
1996	The Rush	Dino Phillips	
1996	Pheromones: The Smell of Sex aka Johnny Rey Sex Series 3	Dino Phillips	
1996	Palm Springs Cruisin	Dino Phillips	
1996	3-Some	Dino Phillips	
1996	Met on the Net	Dino Phillips	
1996	Showboys	Dino Phillips	
1996	Blue Nights	Dino Phillips	
1996	Hell Weekend 2	Dino Phillips	
1996	High Stakes Wrestling 2	Dino Phillips	
1996	Leather Impressions	Dino Phillips	
1996	Erotic Combat 8	Dino Phillips	
1997	Beyond Punishment	Dino Phillips	
1997	Hard for the Money	Dino Phillips	
1997	Stud Fee	Dino Phillips	
1997	Orgies 1	Dino Phillips	
1997	Face Riders	Dino Phillips	
1997	Underground, Jeff Stryker's	Dino Phillips	
1997	Hard-on Hotel	Dino Phillips	
1997	Snap Shots	Dino Phillips	
1997	Initiation 2: Hell Week	Dino Phillips	
1997	Threesome	Dino Phillips	
1997	Tempted	Dino Phillips	
1997	Desert Paradise 1	Dino Phillips	
1997	Sex Toy Story 2	Dino Phillips	
1997	The Best of Leather 2	Dino Phillips	
1997	Talk Dirty to Me	Dino Phillips	
1997	Hunk Hunt 30	Dino Phillips	
1997	Widespread 2	Dino Phillips	
1997	Extreme Scenes for Gays	Dino Phillips	
1997	Fresh Buns 7	Dino Phillips	
1997	Rim Masters	Dino Phillips	
1997	Hometown Boys	Dino Phillips	
1997	Wanted	Dino Phillips	
1997	Leather Jacket Love Story	Private Club Patron	
1997	Star Contact, Chrystal Crawford's	Dino Phillips	
1997	Ass Slappin' 1	Dino Phillips	
1997	Probation	Dino Phillips	
1997	Lockerroom Sex Brawl	Dino Phillips	
1997	Sex Wrestling 4	Dino Phillips	
1998	A Lesson Learned	Dino Phillips	
1998	Snafu	Dino Phillips	
1998	Always Available	Dino Phillips	
1998	Orgies 4	Dino Phillips	
1998	Plugged	Dino Phillips	
1998	Too Many Tops	Dino Phillips	
1998	Gay 4 the Weekend aka Gay for the Weekend	Dino Phillips	
1998	Runway Studs	Dino Phillips	
1998	Penetration on Pennsylvania Avenue	Dino Phillips	
1998	Hawaiian Vacation 2	Dino Phillips	
1998	The Dildo Voyeur	Dino Phillips	
1998	The Object of My Erection	Dino Phillips	
1998	Inside Men 2	Dino Phillips	
1998	Wanna Be in Pictures?	Dino Phillips	
1998	Hawaiian Vacation 1	Dino Phillips	
1998	Trixxx of the Trade	Dino Phillips	
1998	Rent to Bone	Dino Phillips	
1998	Eroto Wrestling 3	Dino Phillips	
1998	Huge Nutbusters	Dino Phillips	
1998	Russell the Wonder Muscle	Dino Phillips	
1998	Squirting Cocks	Dino Phillips	
1998	The Underboss	Dino Phillips	
1998	Spank Me Man!	Dino Phillips	
1998	WEHO Alley	Dino Phillips	
1998	BiTanic	Dino Phillips	
1998	Cruizn' 4 Sex	Dino Phillips	
1998	Hot Tub Fever	Dino Phillips	
1998	Mount the Big One	Dino Phillips	
1998	Mat Muscle Mayhem 2	Dino Phillips	
1998	Rendezvous At the Golden Gate Bed & Breakfast	Dino Phillips	
1998	Heat of the City	Dino Phillips	
1999	Skateboard Sliders	Man in Sewer	
1999	Wild Sex in America	Dino Phillips	
1999	Opposites Attract	Dino Phillips	
1999	Cockstar 3	Dino Phillips	
1999	Hard Lovin	Dino Phillips	
1999	Burying the Bone	Dino Phillips	
1999	Nude Science	Dino Phillips	
1999	Hardcore Mat Fights	Dino Phillips	
1999	Biagra	Dino Phillips	
1999	Fantasies and Adventures 2	Dino Phillips	
2000	The Head Mechanic	Dino Phillips	
2000	The Underboss	Bodyguard	
2000	From Room to Room	Dino Phillips	
2000	Peters	Peter Duke	
2000	VamBIres	Dino Phillips	
2000	Babes Ballin' Boys 5	Dino Phillips	
2000	Bologna Pony	Dino Phillips	
2000	Super Squirters	Dino Phillips	
2001	Going Down & Cumming Out in Beverly Hills	Dino Phillips	
2001	Ass Slammers	Dino Phillips	
2001	Hard-On Wrestling 1	Dino Phillips	
2001	Meat Packers 2	Dino Phillips	
2002	Breaking Him In	Dino Phillips	
2002	Full Frontal	Dino Phillips	
2003	Bear Ass	Dino Phillips	
2003	3-Way Sandwiches 1	Dino Phillips	
2003	Gay American Heroes	Dino Phillips	
2003	No Twink Zone 1	Dino Phillips	
2004	West Hollywood Sex Party aka Dereck, Drew, Dean & Dino	Dino Phillips	
2004	You've Got Male	Dino Phillips	
2005	Man Talk	Dino Phillips	
2006	Erotic Combat 3	Dino Phillips	
2006	The Best of the Rockland Brothers	Dino Phillips	
2007	Erotic Combat 2	Dino Phillips	
2007	Cum Dump (Toxxxic)	Dino Phillips	
2008	Erotic Combat 4	Dino Phillips	
2008	Feeding Frenzy: Storm Chronicles 4	Dino Phillips	
2008	Great Dane Gold Collector's Edition 1	Dino Phillips	
2008	Great Dane Gold Collector's Edition 2	Dino Phillips	
2011	Erotic Combat 11	Dino Phillips	
2011	Erotic Oil Wrestling 1	Dino Phillips	
2012	Erotic Combat 6	Dino Phillips	
2014	Erotic Oil Wrestling 2	Dino Phillips	
2018	20 Years of HDK Boys	Dino Phillips	
2020	Super Studs of Yesteryear 1	Dino Phillips	
2021	Best of Manville Retro	Dino Phillips	
2023	High Stakes Wrestling 1 & 2	Dino Phillips	

== Awards and nominations ==
Year	Award	Category	Work	Result	Ref
1996	Grabby Awards	Best Newcomers	Himself	Won	
1996	Adult Video News	Best Supporting Actor	Happily Ever After	Won	
1998	GayVN Awards	Best Actor	A Lesson Learned	Nominated	
2000	GayVN Awards	Best Screenplay	Peters	Nominated	
