= Dino Zonić =

Bosnian composer and conductor

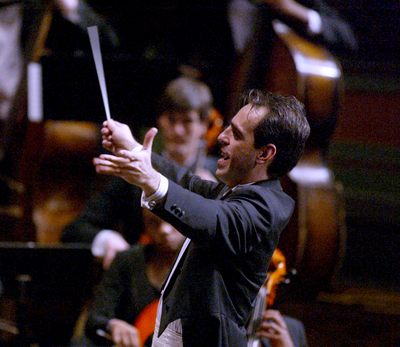
Dino Zonić

Edin Dino Zonić is a Bosnian composer and conductor.

== Biography ==
Zonić was born and raised in Sarajevo. He is the composer, conductor, and director of productions throughout Europe and the United States concert halls, festivals and theaters of Europe and the United States, including for Pope John Paul II, the Dalai Lama and US President Bill Clinton. He was named as Cultural Ambassador of Bosnia and Herzegovina.

During the war in 1993, Zonić began to compose CIRCLE, a musical which played for four years in concert halls in Europe and the United States such as "Theatre an der Wien" in Vienna-Austria, the City of London Festival, "Irish Art Center" in New York, "Vatroslav Lisinski" Concert Hall in Zagreb, Croatia, and "Schuster Performing Arts Center" in Dayton, Ohio.
