= Dino Kovačević =

Austrian footballer

Personal information
- Full name: Dino Kovačević
- Date of birth: 21 November 1999 (age 26)
- Place of birth: Austria
- Height: 1.76 m (5 ft 9 in)
- Position: Attacking midfielder

Team information
- Current team: ASKÖ Oedt
- Number: 7

Youth career
- 2006–2019: Vorwärts Steyr

Senior career*
Years	Team	Apps	(Gls)
2017–2019	Vorwärts Steyr	10	(0)
2020–	ASKÖ Oedt	54	(14)
2022	→ Juniors OÖ (loan)	0	(0)
- * Club domestic league appearances and goals as of 20:17, 26 October 2025 (UTC)

Dino Kovačević (born 21 November 1999) is an Austrian footballer who plays as an attacking midfielder for ASKÖ Oedt.

== Career ==
=== Club career ===
Kovačević is a product of SK Vorwärts Steyr. At the age of 16, he became a regular starter for the clubs reserve team and was also called up for a training camp in Turkey with the first team in the winter 2016. On 13 May 2017, Kovačević got his official debut for the club on 13 May 2017 against the reserve team of SK Sturm Graz in the Austrian Regionalliga. In that season, he made a total of two appearances in the Austrian Regionalliga, seven in the 2017–18 season and one in the 2018–19 season, where the team had been promoted to the Austrian Football Second League.

With nine goals for the reserve team in the 2019–20 season and yet no appearances for the first team in the 2019-20 Austrian Football Second League season, the club announced on 4 December 2020, that Kovačević would join OÖ Liga club ASKÖ Oedt on 1 January 2020. Kovačević scored in his first league game for Oedt on 15 August 2020 against SV Zebau Bad Ischl. On 2 February 2022, Kovačević was loaned out to 2. Liga club FC Juniors OÖ until the end of the season.
