= Dino Mascotto =

Canadian ice hockey player (1932–2017)

- Born: October 25, 1932 Sioux Lookout, Ontario, Canada
- Died: December 20, 2017 (aged 85) Toledo, Ohio, U.S.
- Height: 6 ft 0 in (183 cm)
- Weight: 205 lb (93 kg; 14 st 9 lb)
- Position: Defense
- Shot: Left
- Played for: Providence Reds; Quebec Aces; Toledo Hornets; Trois-Rivieres Lions
- Playing career: 1952–1971

Dino A. Mascotto (October 25, 1932 – December 20, 2017) was a Canadian professional ice hockey player who played in the American Hockey League for the Providence Reds. He also played for the Toledo Hornets in the International Hockey League, and for the Quebec Aces and Trois-Rivieres Lions in the Quebec Hockey League. Mascotto died in Toledo, Ohio on December 20, 2017, at the age of 85.
