= Dino Innocenti =

Italian ice hockey player

Personal information
- Nationality: Italian
- Born: 6 December 1913 St. Moritz, Switzerland
- Died: 1 December 1971 (aged 57) Milan, Italy

Sport
- Sport: Ice hockey

Dino Innocenti (6 December 1913 – 1 December 1971) was an Italian ice hockey player. He competed in the men's tournament at the 1948 Winter Olympics.
