= Capari =

Capari Цапари
- Village
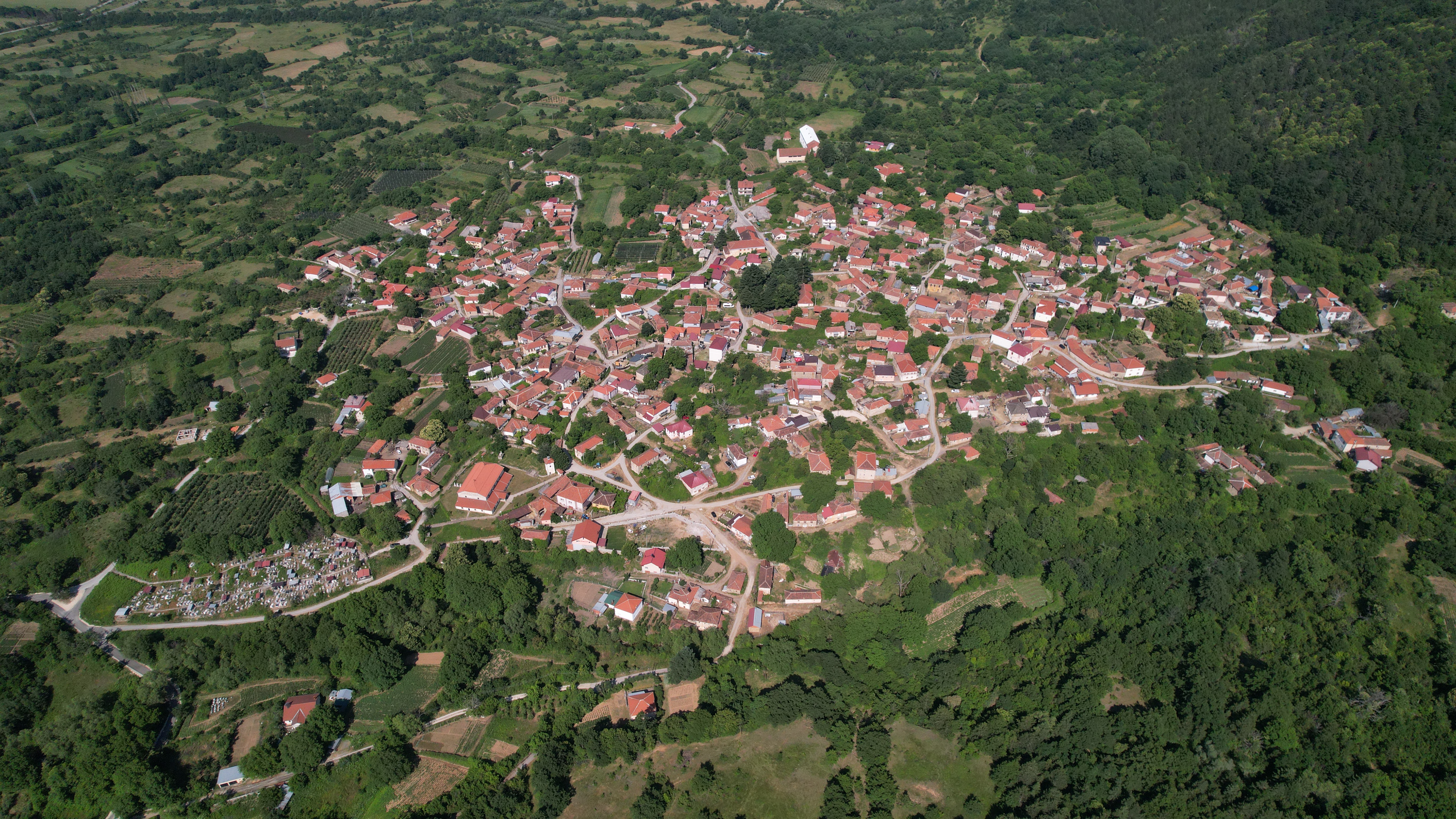
- Air view of the village

- Location within North Macedonia
- Country: North Macedonia
- Region: Pelagonia
- Municipality: Bitola

Population (2021)
  - Total: 307
- Time zone: UTC+1 (CET)
  - Summer (DST): UTC+2 (CEST)

Capari (Macedonian: Цапари) is a village in North Macedonia. It was formerly a municipality center, but is now within the Bitola municipality.

== Demographics ==
According to the 2002 census, the village had a total of 493 inhabitants. Ethnic groups in the village include:

- Macedonians 493

As of the 2021 census, Capari had 307 residents with the following ethnic composition:

- Macedonians 284
- Bosniaks 1
- Aromanians 1
- Persons from whom data are taken from administrative sources 21
