= Dino Moras =

French biochemist

Dino Moras, born on 23 November 1944, is a French biochemist, research director at the CNRS and co-director of the Institute of Genetics and Molecular and Cellular Biology (IGBMC) in Illkirch-Graffenstaden until 2010.

== Biography ==
Dino Moras is a chemist by training with a thesis defended in 1971 at the University of Strasbourg, formerly Louis-Pasteur University. After a post-doctoral fellowship at Purdue University in Indiana, USA, he joined the CNRS in 1969 and founded the department of crystallography at IBMC in 1980. In 1995 he moved with his CNRS unit in the new IGBMC. He became a member of the American Academy of Arts and Sciences in 1998 and a full member of the Academy of Sciences in 1999.

In 2002, following Pierre Chambon and Jean-Louis Mandel, he was Deputy Director and then Director of the IGBMC in Strasbourg from 2002 to 2010.

== Main Scientific contributions ==
=== Chemistry ===
1968 - Synthesis and structure determination of a heterocycle without carbon atom.

1971 - Structure determination of heterocyclic cryptates.

1982 - First structural characterization and imaging of H_{3}O^{+}, the catalytic intermediate at the heart of acid-base catalysis postulated by Brönsted in 1918).

=== Structural Biology ===
==== Structure-function relationships in transfer RNAs (tRNAs) and aminoacyl-tRNA synthetases and their relation to the origin of the genetic code ====
(i) Crystal structure of tRNAasp, the second to be solved at atomic resolution.

(ii) Partition of aaRSs into two classes based on structural and functional correlation (each class of enzymes targets different chiral centers).

(iii) The first structure determination of a class II tRNA-aaRS complex led to the elucidation of the reaction mechanism for the aspartic acid system, prototypic of all class II enzymes. It provided the structural explanation for the different chirality of the targets in the two classes. Further the crystal structure led to the discovery and functional characterization of a novel conformation of adenosine triphosphate (ATP). The latter was so far only found in class II enzymes.

(iv) The crystal structure of threonyl-tRNA synthetase enlightened the molecular mechanism of the editing reaction to correct for tRNA mischarging by serine thus solving the related Pauling paradox for the fidelity of translation.

==== Transcription regulation by Nuclear Hormones Receptors (NRs) ====
The superfamily of NRs, ligand-dependent transcription factors, regulates the expression of important target genes. NRs control most physiological functions and are implicated in several pathological processes.

In 1995 he solved the first crystal structures of the ligand binding domains (LBDs) of two NRs of retinoids (RXR and RAR) in their apo and liganded form respectively. These structures allowed to define a canonical unique fold for the whole family and revealed the molecular mechanism of ligand dependent activation, setting up the bases for the design of agonist and antagonist drugs. The crystal structure of RXR LBD was the first determination of a protein structure using Xenon as heavy atom derivative.

His team contributed several other molecular structures of NRs LBDs, notably those of human VDR (vitamin D) and insect's receptor Ecdysone (EcR).

In 2004 a comparative analysis of the primary sequences lead to the partition of the superfamily into two classes according to mutually exclusive invariant aminoacids. A functional correlation with clear evolutionary implications could be made with their dimerization properties. Class I receptors encompasses homodimers or monomers while class II assembles the receptors that form heterodimers with RXR.

In order to decipher the structural bases of the communication between nuclear receptors, DNA and components of the basal transcription machinery he used the multi-scale approach of integrative structural biology. The solution structures of several nuclear receptors heterodimers bound to their DNA response elements was the first milestone. It was followed by the cryo-EM structure determination of two additional complexes.

== Honors and awards ==
- Bronze Medal, CNRS, 1972, silver Medal, 1982

- French Academy of Sciences, 1987

- European Molecular Biology Organization (EMBO) member, 1987

- Academia Europaea, member, 1998

- American Academy of Arts and Sciences, member, 1998

- Chevalier de l'ordre de la Légion d'honneur, 2002

- Officier dans l’Ordre national du Mérite, 2014
