= Ahmed Dino =

Albanian military leader and politician (1785–1849)

Ahmed Bey Dino (1785–1849) was an Albanian military leader and politician.

== Biography ==
He was born in 1785 in Preveza to the notable Dino family of the town. He was a close friend and ally of Ali Pasha.

In Egypt he was one of the highest ranking generals of Muhammad Ali of Egypt during his conquest of Egypt.

In 1844 he funded and built in Preveza the Yeni mosque, which was proclaimed a cultural monument of Preveza in the 2000s.

In 1847 he took part in the Albanian Revolt of 1847 led by Zenel Gjoleka. Although the revolt was initially successful, Gjoleka was eventually defeated and Ahmed Dino was exiled in Konya where he died in 1849.

He was married to Saliha Çapari of the notable Çapari family, who have roots in Capari. His son Abedin Dino became one of the founders of the League of Prizren and for a short period Minister of Foreign Affairs of the Ottoman Empire. He also had another son Vesel Bey Dino.
