= Devoll District =

District of Devoll Rrethi i Devollit
- District
- Map showing the district within Albania
- Country: Albania
- County: Korçë County
- Capital: Bilisht

Area
  - Total: 429 km^{2} (166 sq mi)

Population (2010)
  - Total: 33,785
  - Density: 78.8/km^{2} (204/sq mi)

Devoll District(Rrethi i Devollit) was one of the thirty-six districts of Albania (which were dissolved in 2000) that is now part of Korçë County. It derives its name from the Devoll river flowing through the valley. It had a population of 33,785, and an area of 429 km². It is in the southeastern corner of the country, and its capital is Bilisht. Its busy border point Kapshticë/Krystallopigi connects the district with the Greek regional units of Florina and Kastoria to the east and southeast. Devoll borders the district of Kolonjë to the southwest and Korçë to the west and north. Devoll is also considered a traditional or "ethnographic" region with borders similar to the former district.

== History ==
Excavations at Tren cave unearthed Mycenaean Greek pottery of the Late Bronze Age. This appears to be of possible local manufacture.

The district is known in history for the Devol fortress, where the Treaty of Devol between Bohemond I of Antioch and Byzantine Emperor Alexios I Komnenos was held in 1108. Its site became forgotten in modern times, however it has been tentatively identified with the site Zvezdë (located at 40°43′N 020°51′E), a conjecture already proposed by the 19th century British traveller William Martin Leake in 1835.

It was in Devoll, while the region was within the Serbian Empire, that Emperor Stefan Dušan died in 1355.

In late Ottoman times and early Independence era, much of the Christian population emigrated abroad and then returned, and later a part of the Muslim population did the same. Today, there is again mass emigration, although this time the local Muslim population is emigrating in larger numbers and higher proportions than the Christian population, a reverse of the "Kurbet" of the previous century.

== Population ==
The population is overwhelmingly ethnically Albanian, with the majority of Albanians there having been Muslim (many of these belonging to the Halveti Order) at the end of the Ottoman era, while a minority of the Albanians, especially those that resided especially in high altitude areas, remained Orthodox Christian. The Albanian Christian population lives mostly in the upper valley of the Devoll river, in the town of Hoçisht, in Bilisht and in the village of Tren, and insist on being called only Albanian and not Greek. Additionally, a part of the original post-Ottoman Albanian Muslim population has converted to Orthodoxy as part of emigration to Greece. The village of Vërnik (Bulgarian: Връбник, Macedonian: Врбник, Vrbnik) is inhabited by Slavs, who were historically referred to, and referred to themselves, as Bulgarians, including by their immediate Albanian neighbors, who casually call them bullgare and currently may self-identify as Bulgarians or (ethnic) Macedonians. Vërnik took active part in the Bulgarian Ilinden Uprising, with all 80 houses in the village being burnt down by the Ottoman forces. The village accepted the supremacy of the Bulgarian Exarchate in 1904. In 1925, the village elders sent a petition to the Prefecture of Korça asking for the opening of a Bulgarian school in the village and participated in the 1935 request on behalf of the Bulgarians in Albania to the Bulgarian tsaritsa Giovanna requesting her intervention for the protection of the Bulgarian people in Albania - at that time an Italian protectorate. Vërnik is also populated by Roma people, who are mainly Muslim . In modern times, among the Albanian population, there has been extensive intermarriage between the Muslim and Christian populations, with the result being that many of the ethnically Albanian youth in the area identity with both traditions, as "half-Muslim, half-Christian". Like elsewhere in Albania, actual religious observance is typically lax although due to Ottoman history even among some non-practicers, religious identity may still plays a role in social relations, being more significant among the older generations.

The Albanian population speaks with a Tosk dialect, while the Slavic population speaks the Kostur dialect of the Macedonian / Bulgarian language. The entire Slavic population is also bilingual in Albanian nowadays.

== Administrative divisions ==
The district consisted of the following municipalities:

=== Devoll Municipality ===
- **Bilisht**
- Hoçisht
- Miras
- Progër
- Qendër Bilisht

Note: - urban municipalities in bold

== Communities and subdivisions ==
- Arrëz
- Bilisht
- Bitinckë
- Braçanj
- Bradvicë
- Cangonji
- Çetë
- Çipan
- Dobranj
- Ecmenik
- Fitore
- Gjurëz
- Grapsh
- Koshnicë
- Kurilë
- Menkulas
- Miras
- Poloskë
- Kuç
- Perparimaj
- Ponçare
- Progër
- Qytezë
- Sinice
- Shuec
- Sul
- Tren
- Trestenik
- Vernik
- Vishoshicë
- Vidohovë
- Ziçisht
- Baban
- Zvezdë

== Notable people ==
- Dritëro Agolli, Albanian writer.
- Eulogios Kourilas, Christian Orthodox Bishop of Korçë and author.
- Nikolaos Dailakis, Greek revolutionary of the Macedonian Struggle
- Costa Chekrezi, Albanian publicist and historian
- Bashkim M. Gjoza, Albanian poet and writer
- Petraq Zoto, Albanian writer
