= Braçanj =

- Village
- Location within Albania
- Coordinates: 40°33′N 20°59′E
- Country: Albania
- County: Korçë
- Municipality: Devoll
- Administrative unit: Miras
- Time zone: UTC+1 (CET)
  - Summer (DST): UTC+2 (CEST)

Braçanj is a small village located in the Korçë County, Albania. It is part of the former municipality Miras. At the 2015 local government reform it became part of the municipality Devoll.

== Agriculture ==
The sole employment in the village is agriculture. This agriculture is primarily subsistence farming with some cash crops being sold to private market traders from the Albanian capital Tirana. Specifically, the main subsistence crops are wheat, corn and other cereals. Tomatoes, okra, garlic, beans, apples, pears, grapes are also grown for the villages own consumption. However, onions, beans and potatoes are the three main cash crops. Each person in the village owns 1,000 m^{2} (10,764 sq ft) that was given to them at the end of Communism. Under the democracy reforms in 1991 the Communist cooperatives were broken-up and the land distributed to the people living in Braçanj and other Albanian villages. Both adults and children were given this land.

== Population ==
It has a population of 600 people (120 families). Since 1991, 30 families have become economic migrants and have moved to bigger cities in Albania (Tirana and Durrës) and abroad.

== Geography ==
The closet places to Braçanj are the neighbouring villages of sq:Dobranj, sq:Ponçarë, and sq:Kurilë. Braçanj is 1.5 km (0.93 mi) from nearest the Greek border and the customs checkpoint of Krystallopigi. Braçanj is 2 km (1.2 mi) from the Albanian customs checkpoint of Kapshticë and 7 km (4 mi) from the Albanian town of Bilisht.
