= Kokogllave mine =

Nickel mine in Bilisht, Korçë County, Albania

- Location: Bilisht, Korçë County, Albania
- Products: Nickel
- Opened: 2009
- Company: European Nickel

The Kokogllave mine is a large mine in the south-east of Albania in Korçë County 114 km south-east of the capital, Tirana. Kokogllave represents the largest nickel reserve in Albania having estimated reserves of 30 million tonnes of ore grading 1.3% nickel. The 30 million tonnes of ore contains 390,000 tonnes of nickel metal.
