= Devolli mine =

Nickel mine in Bilisht, Korçë County, Albania

Location
- Location: Bilisht, Korçë County, Albania

Production
- Products: Nickel

History
- Opened: 2009

Owner
- Company: European Nickel

The Devolli mine is a large mine in the south-east of Albania in Korçë County 114 km south-east of the capital, Tirana. Devolli represents the largest nickel reserve in Albania having estimated reserves of 35.6 million tonnes of ore grading 1.2% nickel. The 35.6 million tonnes of ore contains 427,000 tonnes of nickel metal.
