= Nikolaos Dailakis =

Greek revolutionary

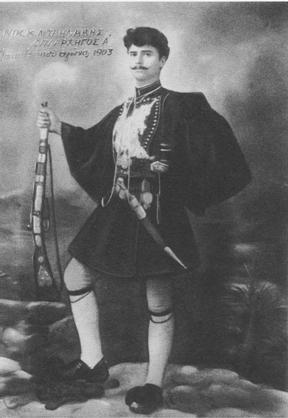
- Dailakis during the Macedonian Struggle.
- Native name: Νικόλαος Νταηλάκης
- Nickname(s): Lakis; Λάκης
- Born: c. 1883; Verniki, Monastir Vilayet, Ottoman Empire (Now Albania)
- Died: 5 October 1941; Kastoria, Hellenic State
- Allegiance: Kingdom of Greece
- Branch: Hellenic Army
- Battles / wars: Macedonian Struggle; Balkan Wars; First Balkan War; Second Balkan War

Nikolaos or Lakis Dailakis (Greek: Νικόλαος Νταηλάκης) was a Slavophone Greek revolutionary of the Greek Struggle for Macedonia.

== Early life and family ==
Dailakis was born in the village of Verniki, Monastir Vilayet Ottoman Empire (now Vernik in southern Albania. He was the eldest son of Konstantinos Dailakis. His younger brother was named Ioannis. His great-grandfather, also a Konstantinos Dailakis, had opposed for several years the Albanian Sali Bey, who wished to turn Verniki into his estate. His opposition continued and intensified with the Greek War of Independence. This resulted in a rivalry that would span generations.

== Macedonian Struggle ==
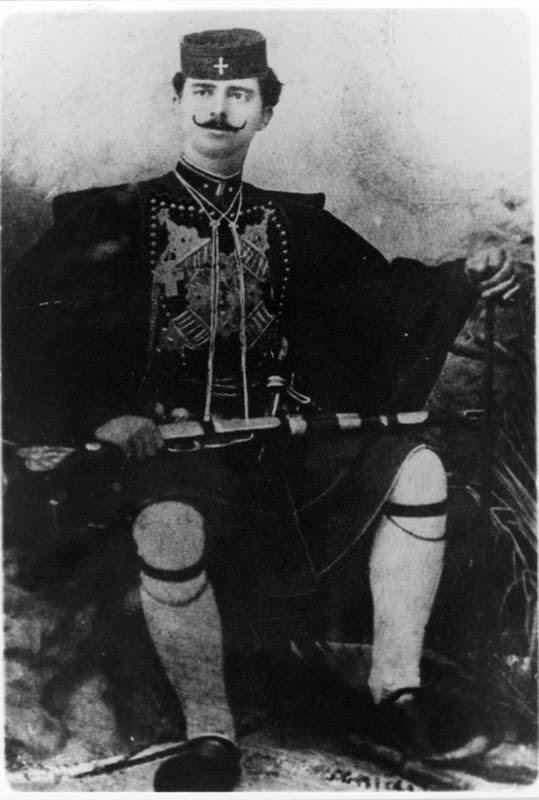
Nikolaos Dailakis in Makedonomachos uniform c. 1904-1908

In 1900, at the age of 18, Nikolaos Dailakis killed Demir Aga, a descendant of Sali Bey, whose family still ruled Verniki. With fear of retaliation against villagers, Dailakis surrendered and was sentenced to 15 years in prison. However, with the help of his uncle, Elias Kovatsidis, he was released on bail. On his return failed ambush by Demir Aga's family, made him leave the village and enter a life of theft. Until the end of 1901, he targeted local Ottoman dynasties in collaboration with the Internal Macedonian Revolutionary Organization. In 1902, he met Konstantinos Kottas Christou in Korestia became a Makedonomachos under his command and fought against Bulgarian groups and Ottoman forces. With an increase in Bulgarian attacks on Greek villages, Nikolaos Dailakis, with the assistance of his father, Konstantinos, who was a prefect in Verniki, set up a network of organizations in the regions of Korestia, Prespa, and Devolis to protect Greeks and Greek interests.

Following the failed Ilinden–Preobrazhenie Uprising and the unfavourable conditions it had produced for the Greeks and other Christian populations, Nikolaos Dailakis traveled to boost morale and revitalize the Greek organizations of the region. With the Bulgarians having turned on the Greeks following the uprising, they had begun to terrorize the Greek population and had committed brutal killings and torture of several relatives and friends of Dailakis and Kottas. The two Makedonomachoi took revenge a few days later by killing Komitadji, Dine Yannev, and arresting Lazar Poptraykov, sentencing him to death (he later escaped).

After the death of Kottas in 1904, Nikolaos Dailakis would get in contact with many other chieftains, regional Greek elites, and church officials to organize armed resistance groups. He then went to Kastoria where he had meetings with Germanos Karavangelis to discuss the resistance of Bulgarian pressure to join the Exarchate. There he also managed to derail a network of IMRO Exarch informants.

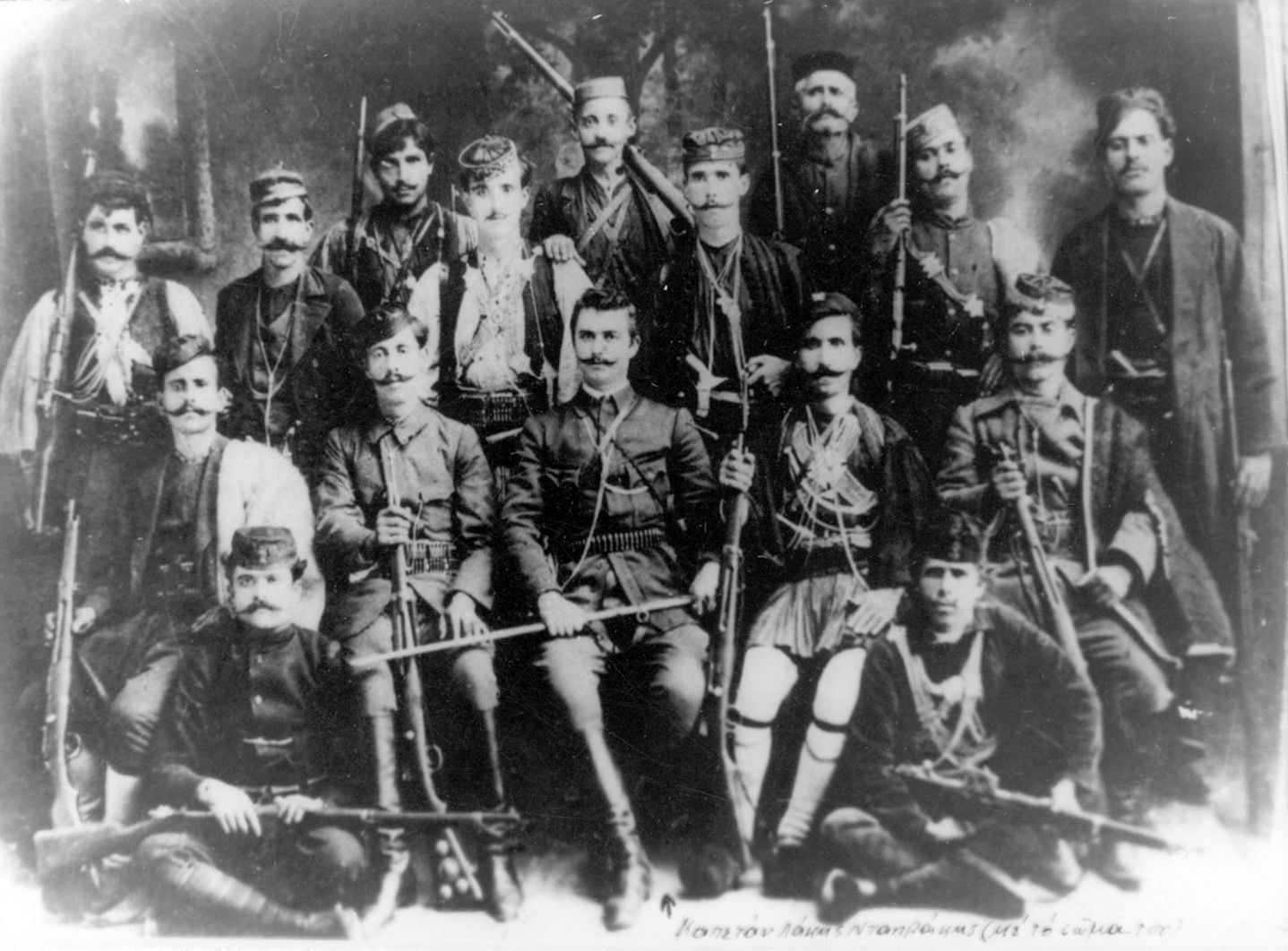
Nikolaos Dailakis with his band (1904-1908).

In early 1905, Nikolaos Dailakis arrested and executed Komitadji Christos Sapkarov and raided a Bulgarian hideout with other Chieftains such as Georgios Tsontos. In April, he was involved in smuggling and in procuring Mannlicher rifles and ammunition for the Makedonomachoi. Throughout the rest of the year, he was involved in many clashes with the Bulgarians, Ottomans, and even an Albanian armed group, and was successful in eliminating several Bulgarian sympathizers. The efforts of Dailakis resulted in the intensified use of the resources of his opponents, and many attempts were made on his life.

In 1907, he left for Athens for the arrangement of weapon procurements and on his return, exterminated the Romanian Tsakamakas, who were partially responsible for the betrayal that resulted in the death of Pavlos Melas in 1904. He was eventually arrested by Ottoman authorities but was given amnesty following the Young Turk Revolution. Upon his release, he was marked for assassination by the Turkish organization "Cemiet", leaving him under constant pursuit.

During the struggle he was also ransomed by the local Ottoman landlord Hussein bey, but despite his hideout near Hoçisht was surrounded, he managed to escape.

After the Balkan Wars Dailakis returned to his birthplace of Verniki. He later settled near the city of Kastoria following full control being granted to Albania over his home region. On October 5, 1941, during the triple Axis Occupation of Greece, he was assassinated. Some claim it was by a group of Bulgarians and others claim it was by members of the left wing resistance. His brother, Ioannis, and two of his sons were also killed during the war by members of ELAS. He was survived by his widow and his remaining three children.

== Legacy ==
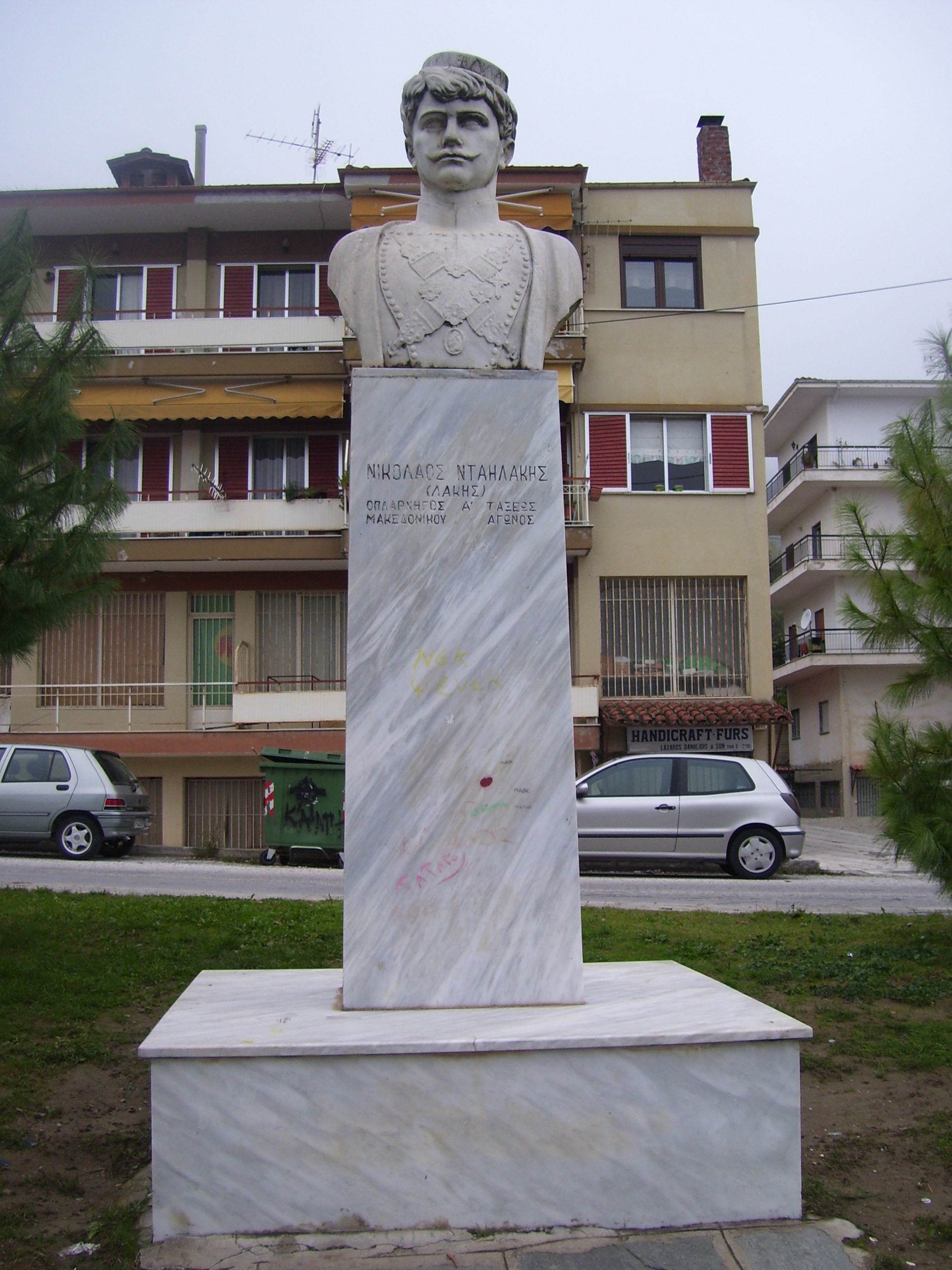
The bust of Nikolaos Dailakis in Kastoria.

He is considered a hero of the Greek Struggle for Macedonian.

There is a bust of him in Kastoria.

A quarter in the city of Kastoria, where he lived, bears his name since 1960.
