= Qendër Bilisht =

- Administrative unit
- Location within Albania
- Coordinates: 40°36′N 21°0′E
- Country: Albania
- County: Korçë
- Municipality: Devoll

Population (2011)
  - Administrative unit: 5,440
- Time zone: UTC+1 (CET)
  - Summer (DST): UTC+2 (CEST)
- Postal Code: 7006
- Area Code: (0)873

Qendër Bilisht is a former municipality in the Korçë County, southeastern Albania. At the 2015 local government reform it became a subdivision of the municipality Devoll. The population at the 2011 census was 5,440. The municipal unit consists of the villages Bitinckë, Tren, Buzliqen, Vërnik, Vishocicë, Kuç, Poloskë, Kapshticë, Trestenik and Kurilë.

== Demographics ==
During the late 2000s linguists Klaus Steinke and Xhelal Ylli seeking to corroborate villages cited in past literature as being Slavic speaking carried out fieldwork in some villages of the area. Buzliqen and Tren were noted as not having a Slavic speaking population with villagers speaking Albanian and older generations stating that they have used only that language. Villagers from nearby Pustec municipality that speak south Slavic languages being well informed about the situation of their minority and neighbouring villages stated that they were not aware of anyone having spoken their language in Buzliqen, Tren and Trestenik. Tren is inhabited by Orthodox Christians and Muslims. Buzliqen is inhabited by Muslims and the oldest families of the village are Merxhani, Bostanxhiu, Ganoli and so on. Vërnik is wholly inhabited by Orthodox Slav-speaking inhabitants.
