= Bilisht =

- Administrative unit
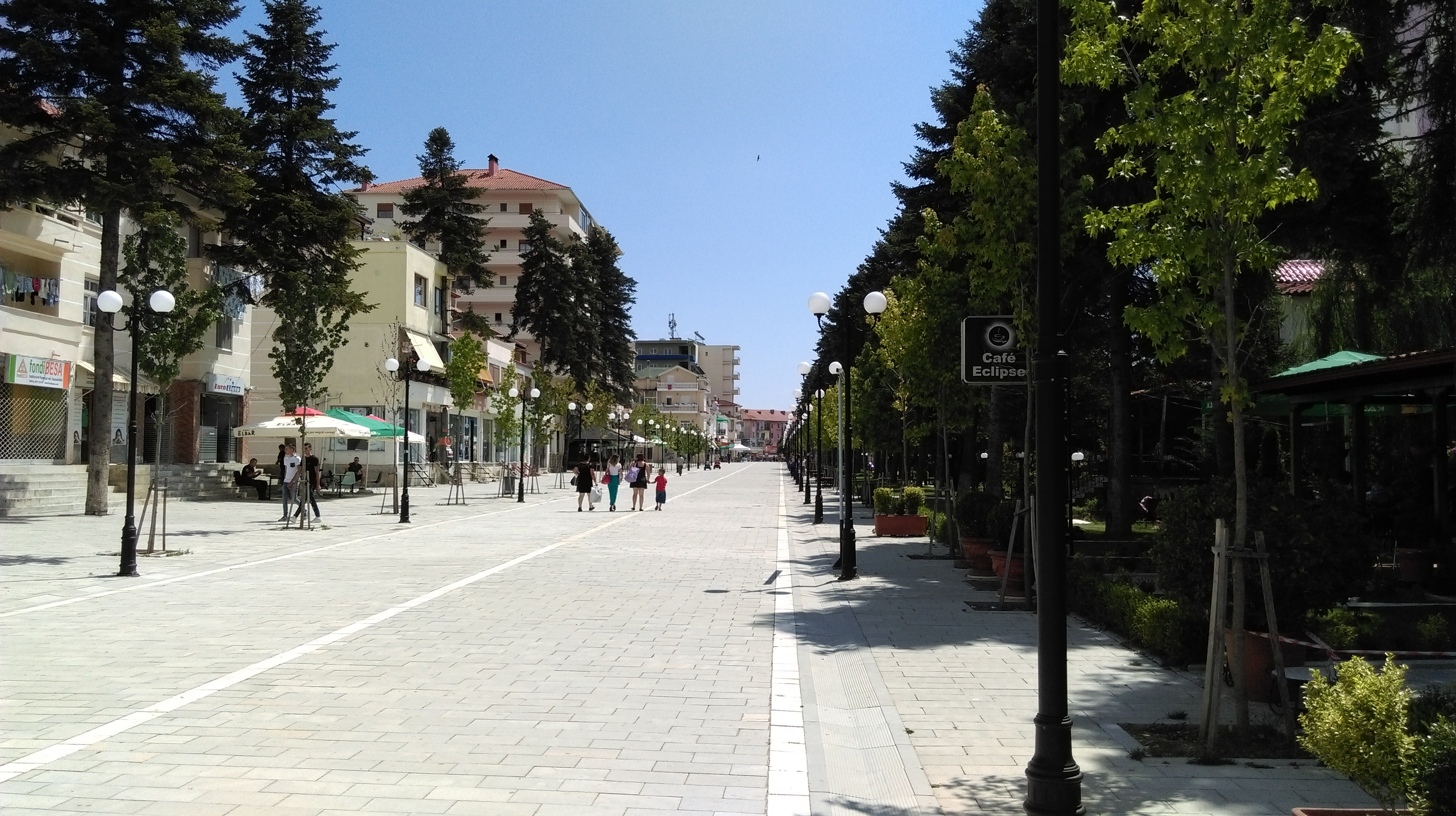
- Bilisht, 2018

- Location within Albania
- Coordinates: 40°37′39″N 20°59′24″E
- Country: Albania
- County: Korçë
- Municipality: Devoll
  - Administrative unit: 4.26 km^{2} (1.64 sq mi)
- Elevation: 922 m (3,025 ft)

Population (2023)
  - Administrative unit: 7,287
  - Administrative unit density: 1,710/km^{2} (4,430/sq mi)
- Time zone: UTC+1 (CET)
  - Summer (DST): UTC+2 (CEST)
- Postal Code: 7006
- Area Code: (0)811

Bilisht (Albanian: Bilisht) is a town and a former municipality in Korçë County, south-eastern Albania. At the 2015 local government reform it became a subdivision and the seat of the municipality Devoll. It was the seat of the former Devoll District. The population as of the 2023 census is 7,287. The town is 9 km from the border with Greece at Kapshticë. The closest Greek village across the border is Krystallopigi in the Florina regional unit. Bilisht is at 890 meters above sea level and has a continental climate with cool summers and cold winters. It serves as an economic centre for the local agriculture, mining, food and textile industries. The football club is Bilisht Sporti.

== Geography ==
The town of Bilisht is the most southeastern city of Albania. It is located to the east of the Devoll Valley, about 880-970m above sea level in a hilly relief that stretches from the Devoll River bed to Kokogllava hill over the city and covers an area of 1.4km2. With average altitude 925 m above sea level Bilisht is the second highest city in Albania after Ersekë (1020m above sea level).

The city has a very favorable geographic position as it passes through the motorway link connecting Albania with Greece via the Kapshticë customs that is 7 km east of it. In the north the town is bordered by Bitinckë (3 km east of it), east bounded by the hills of Kokogllava (1140m above sea level), Stranra (1280m above sea level), Sellcë (an early residence near Bilisht) and Vërnik, (5 km east), south is bordered by Vishoçicë (3 km south), while west is bordered by Devoll River and villages like Poloskë (4 km), Kuç (3 km), Baban (5.5 km ) and Hoçisht (6.5 km). Bilisht has a population of about 12,000 and is the capital of the Municipality of Devoll.

The tyrbe (tomb) of the Muslim Sufi saint Qazim Baba is located in Bilisht.

== History ==
A fortified location dating from the early Iron Age exists nearby Bilisht.

Bilisht (Ottoman Turkish: بهلشته, Bihlişte) was part of the Ottoman Empire for several centuries. Muslims in the kaza (district) of Bilisht owned tenet farms (baștina) in the late 16th century. Bilisht became an important centre for the Sufi Halveti order and maintained two or three tekkes in the town that were reliant on its tekke in Ohrid. During the Great Eastern Crisis, the Treaty of San Stefano nearly placed Albanian areas such as Bilisht in a proposed large Bulgarian state. Shortly thereafter it was superseded by the Treaty of Berlin that left the town and its surrounding area in the Ottoman Empire. In the late Ottoman period, the nahiya (sub–district) of Bilisht was a centre of revolutionary activity for Albanian and Aromanian cheta groups, whom collectively numbered some 150-200 individuals. Until the early twentieth century, Bilisht experienced population growth from the surrounding rural area, as it was a centre for artisan activities and trade located on important transport lines. It also made the town vulnerable in times of crisis to robberies and war.

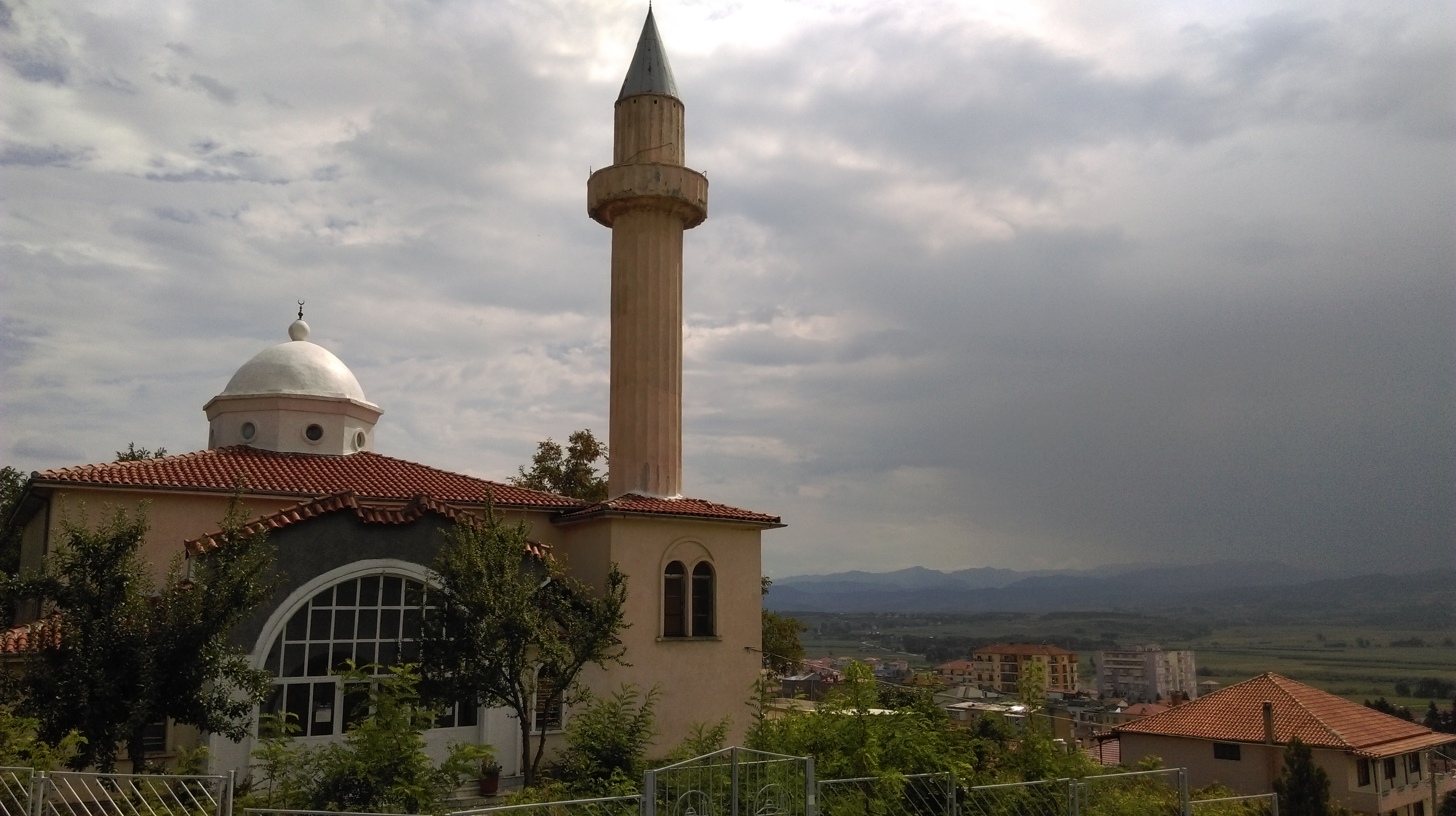
Mosque of Bilisht

Following the Balkan Wars (1912–1913), Bilisht became part of Albania. Some Muslim Albanian villages on the Greek side of the border had Bilisht as their market town until their inhabitants were sent to Turkey during the Greco–Turkish exchange of populations (1923), based on religious criteria. Due to the Albanian census of 1923, the urban status of Bilisht was recognised. During the interwar period a tekke of the Rifa`i Sufi Order existed in Bilisht and part of the surrounding Muslim rural population emigrated to Australia. Bilisht was also the centre of the Bilisht district.

In the 1960s, the area around Bilisht and neighboring Korçë had the highest densities of population in mountainous districts within the country (500 metres and above). The Albanian communist government constructed many bunkers in the Bilisht area. During the early 1990s, Christianity and later Islam were revived in Albania. As such in Bilisht, the Orthodox church of Saint Paraskeva (Shën e Premte) was rebuilt in 1992 followed by a new mosque in 1995. The town in post communist Albania has also been a recipient of in-migration by a small number of people from other parts of the country, due to pre-existing family connections. New shops have opened in Bilisht and it has been one of a number of towns in the wider area that has attracted investment. Old communist era bunkers in Bilisht have been repurposed into cafes and other uses. Built in the late 2010s, the Trans Adriatic Pipeline (TAP) transporting Azerbaijani gas to Europe runs through Bilisht.

== Demographics ==
Ottoman geographer Hadji Khalfa (1609–1657) wrote that during the mid seventeenth century the nahiya (sub-district) of Bilisht was populated by a mixed Albanian and Bulgarian population and the Christian element was declining due to local disturbances and inhabitants converting to Islam. In the early nineteenth century, the ethnic border between Albanians and the neighbouring Slavic (Bulgarian) population ran close and to the east of Bilisht. Between 1805 and 1807, the British traveller William Martin Leake passed through the area, referred to the ethnic border and stated that the people of Bilisht spoke Albanian.

During the 1980s, the population was 5600. In post–communist Albania, Bilisht contains a mixed population of Muslims and Orthodox Christians. In 1995, it had 8,000 inhabitants and 7,000 in 2001. Apart from the village of Vërnik, all other settlements of the Devoll region including Bilisht are populated by an Albanian speaking population. A Romani community also exists in the town that settled in Bilisht during the 17th century. As of the late 2010s, the majority population of Bilisht is Muslim of the Bektashi Order.

== Education ==
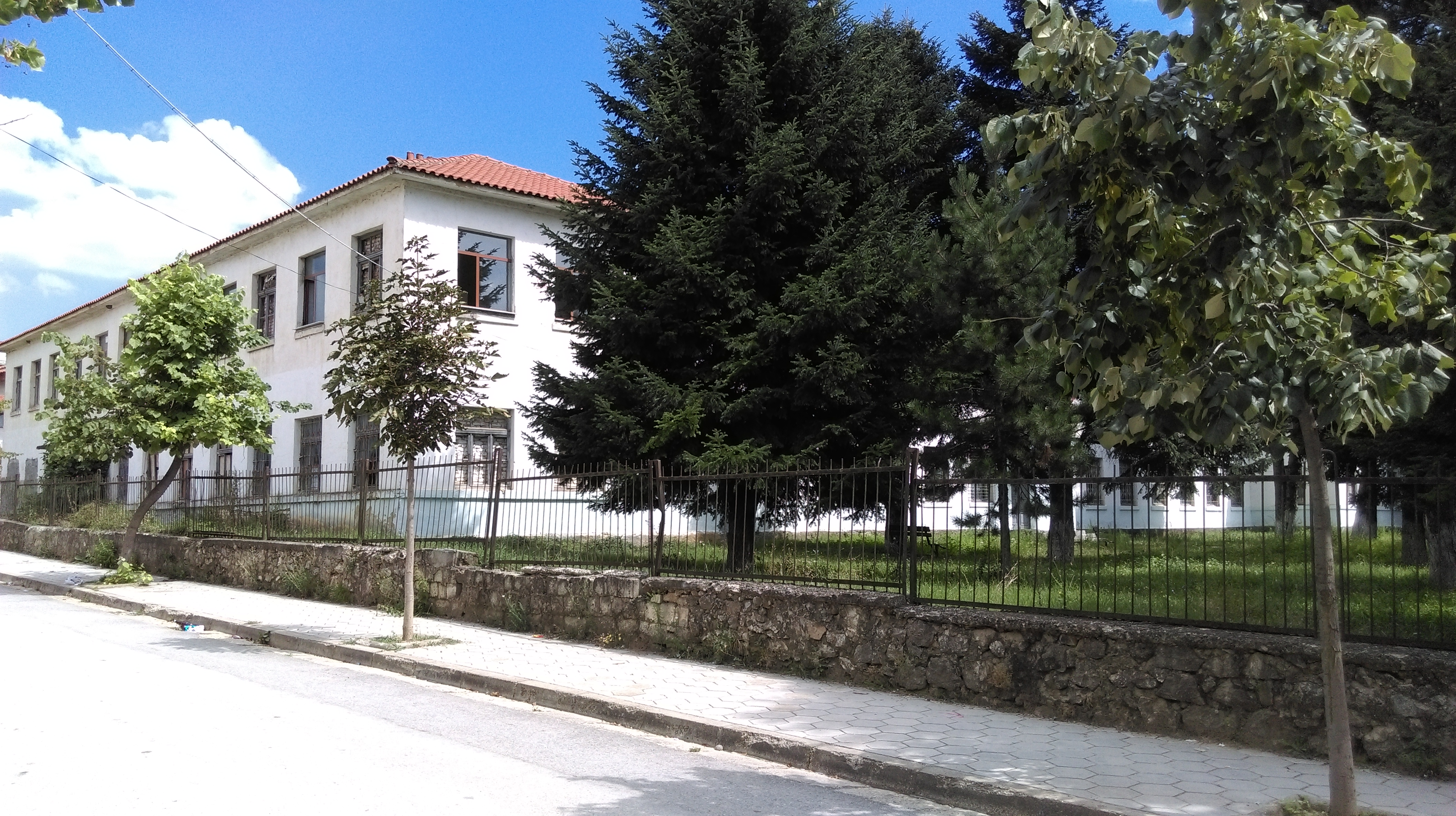
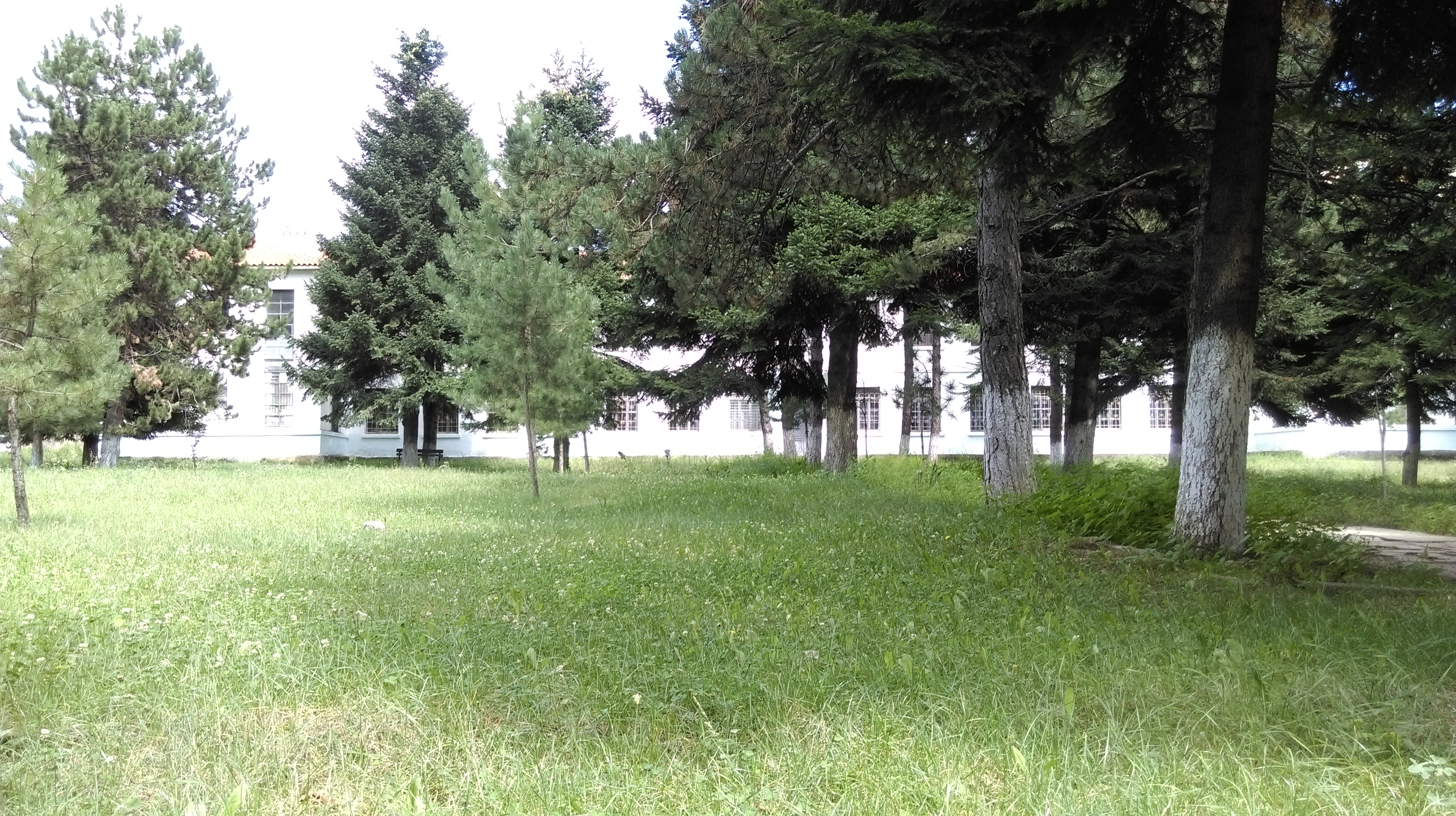
Primary schools "Myteza Sala" (left), "Dritëro Agolli" (right)

An Ottoman secondary school (rüştiye) was opened in Bilisht during 1881–1882. Twelve years later it closed down due to a decrease of students and poor quality teaching from its lone educator. It was transformed into a primary school by the early 1890s. In the mid 1890s it had reverted to a secondary school and was the smallest in the region. By the 1900s, it had two teachers and around 20 students.

A Greek language school was already operating in Bilisht in 1888, while Greek education was still present during the 1912–1914 period. Located outside of Albania's official Greek minority zone, post communist Bilisht has a Greek language and cultural tutoring centre.

In modern Bilisht, there are two Albanian primary schools, "Myteza Sala" with 20 teachers and "Dritëro Agolli" with 25 teachers. Bilisht has an Albanian elementary school "Fuat Babani" and it caters for up to 800 students. It was completely reconstructed and modernised through a €600,000 investment by the TAP pipeline in 2018.

== Governance ==
The municipal council for Devoll composed of 17 members is located in Bilisht. In local Albanian elections of the early 2000s, a member of the Romani community was elected to the municipal council as a councilor. At the 2011 Albanian local elections, the Macedonian minority succeeded in electing one councilor to the municipal council. In the early 1990s, the Greek political party Omonia in Albania fielded a local candidate from Bilisht in elections, however it was later withdrawn after threats of violence.

== Popular culture ==
The town of Bilisht is the location for events in an Albanian polyphonic song Në plepat Bilishtit (The poplars of Bilisht) that commemorates male bravery, honour and family values.

== Gallery ==
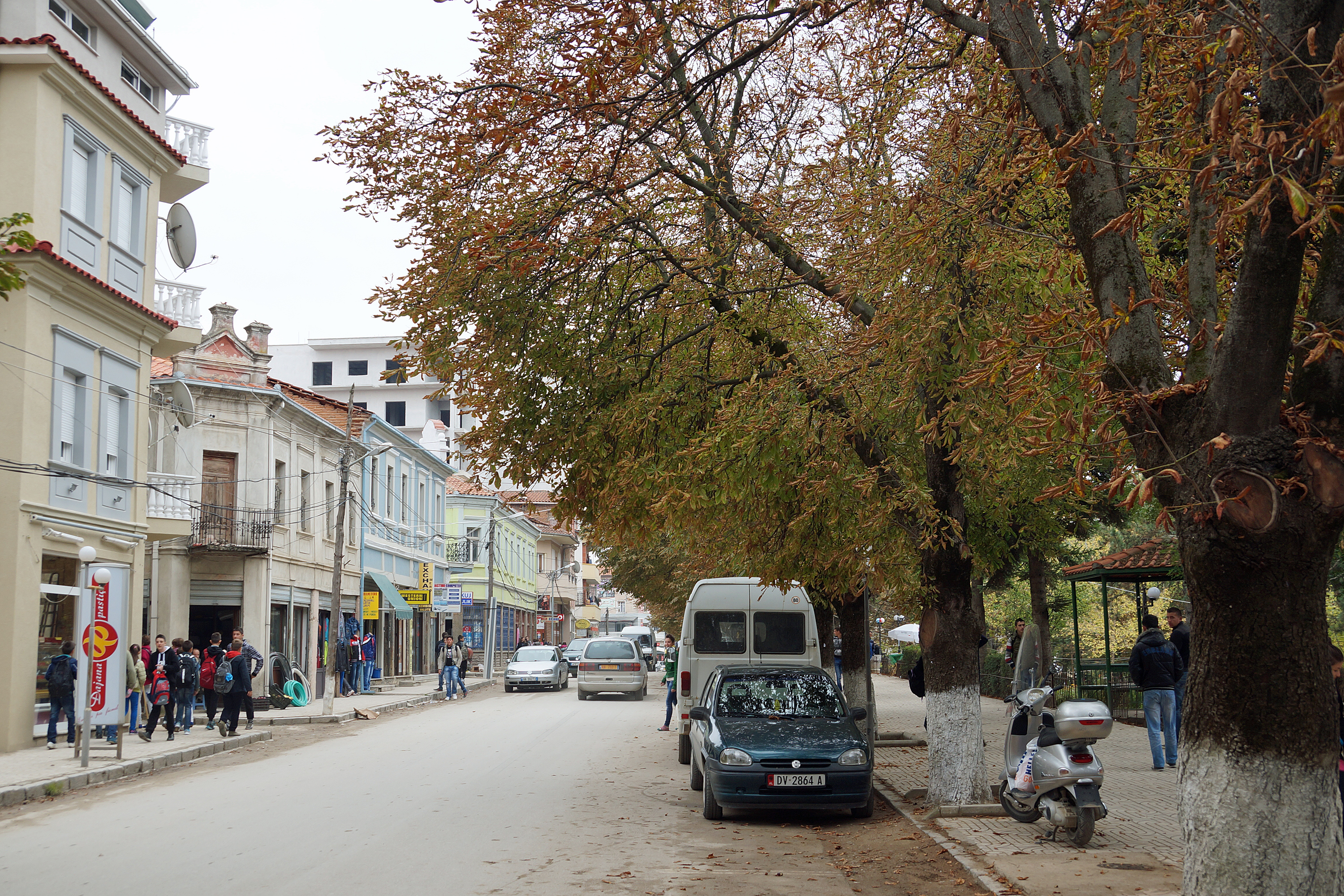
Centre of Bilisht, 2013

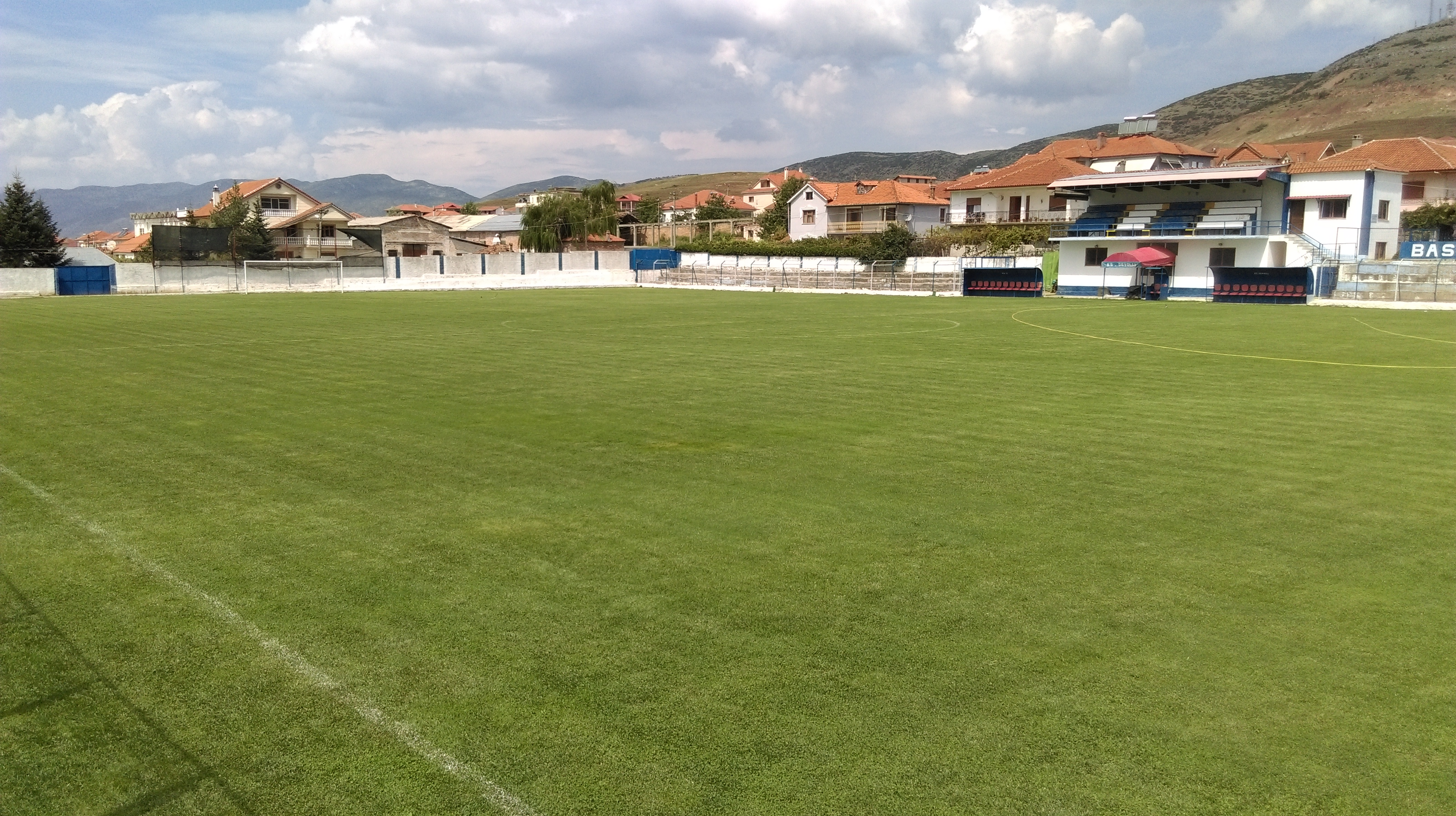
"Devolli" Stadium

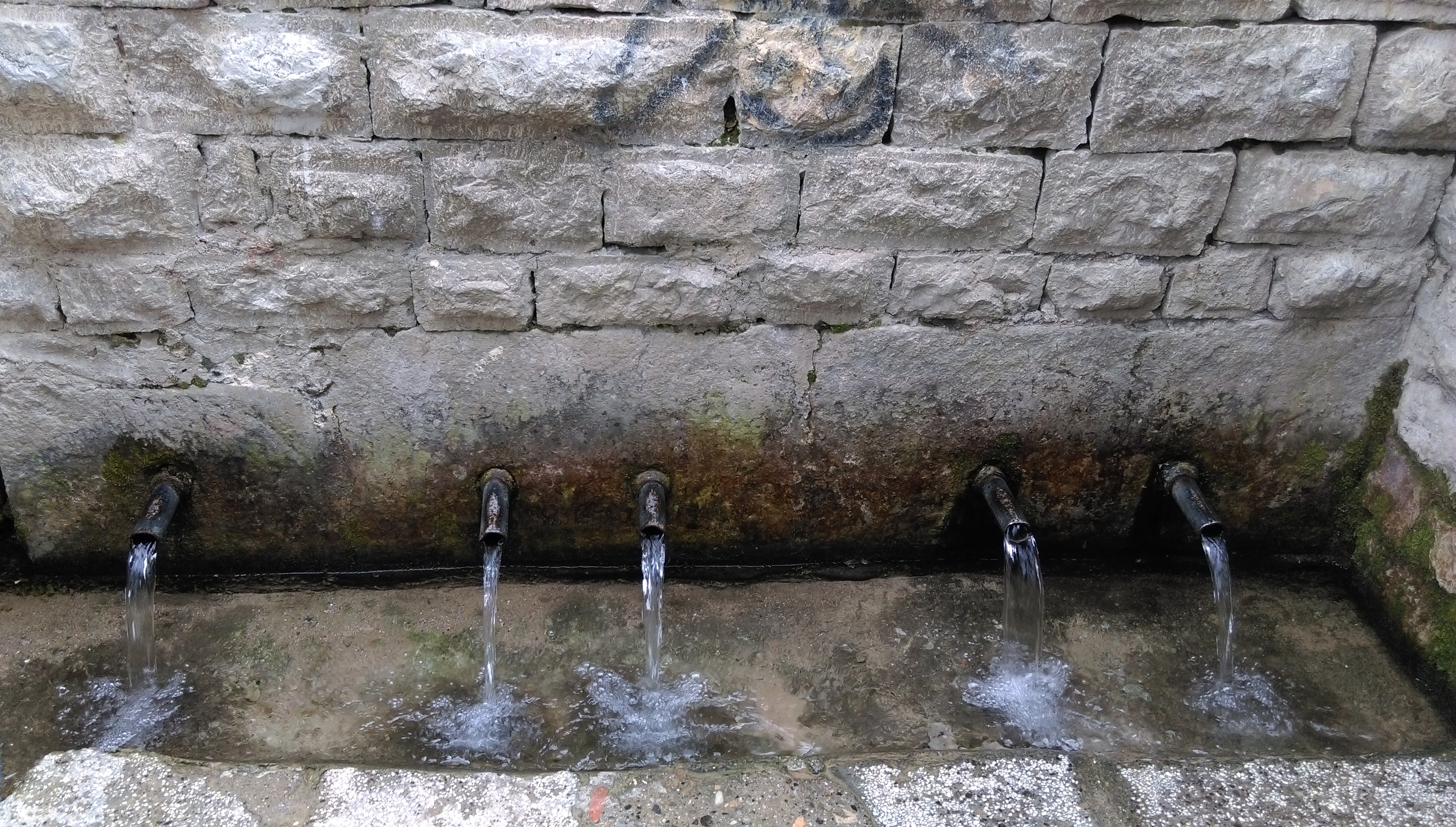
"Çezma e Madhe" (large water fountain), erected 1914–1918

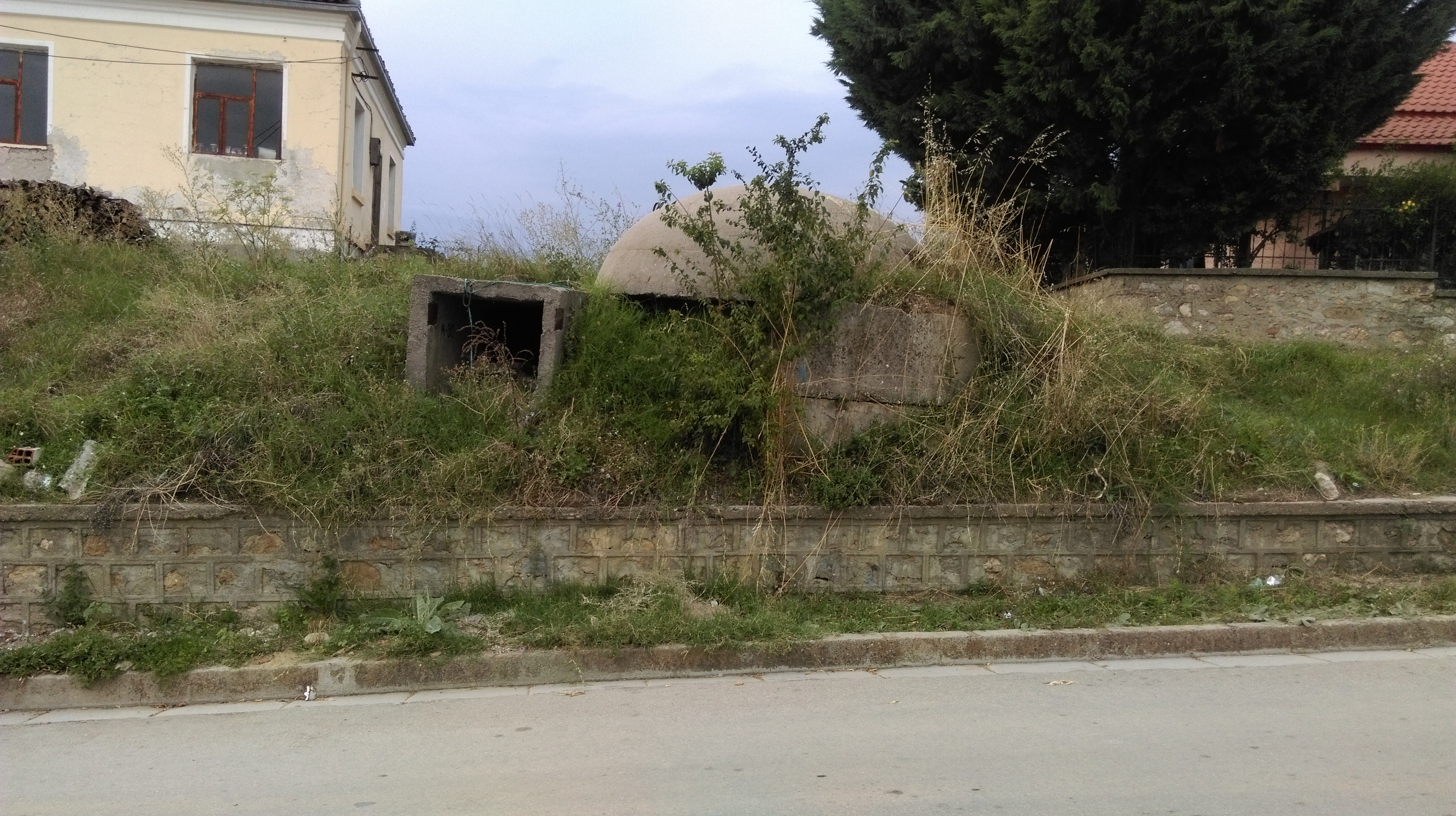
Communist era bunker

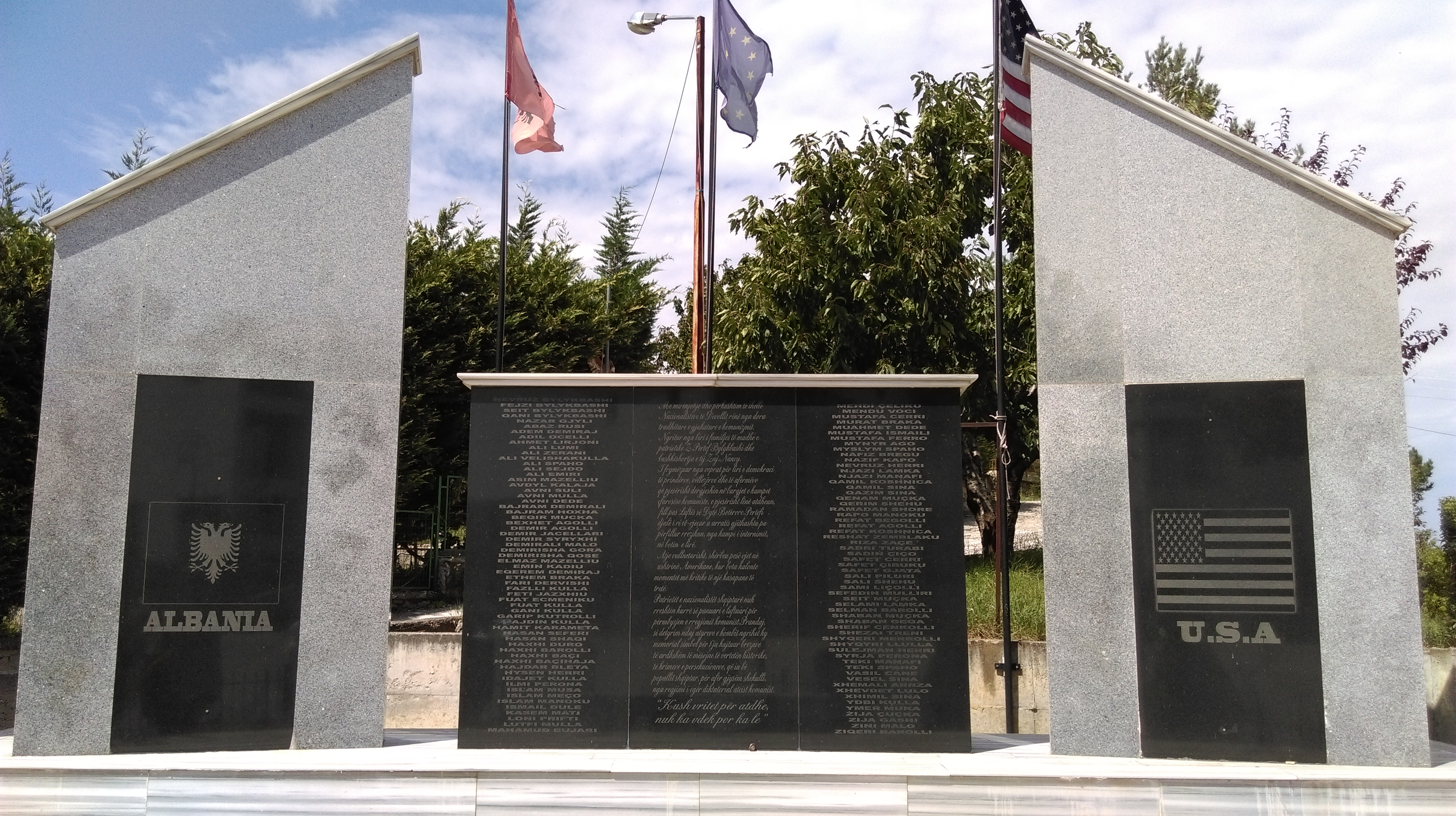
Monument to local victims of communism

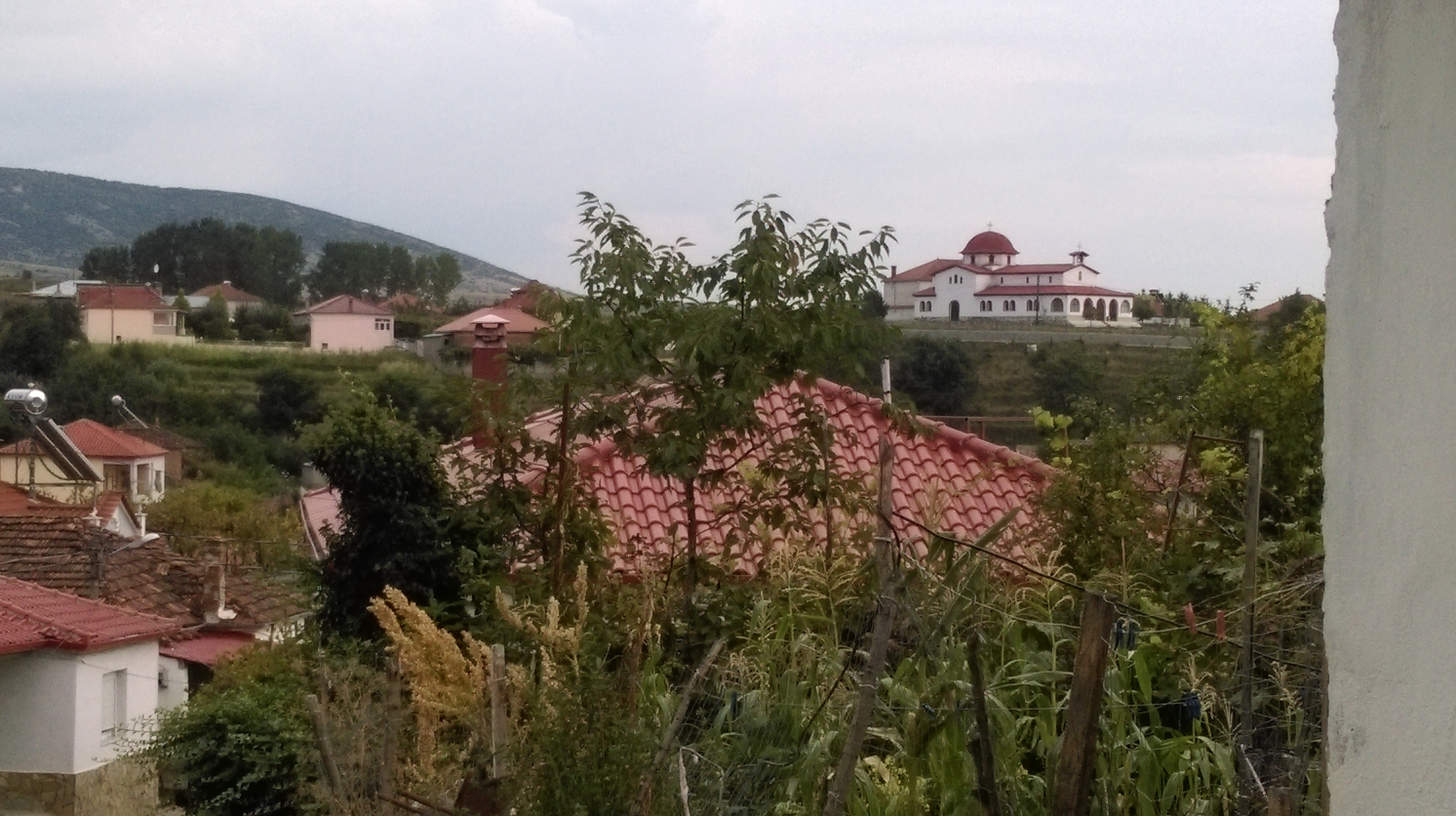
Bilisht and Orthodox Church (far right corner)

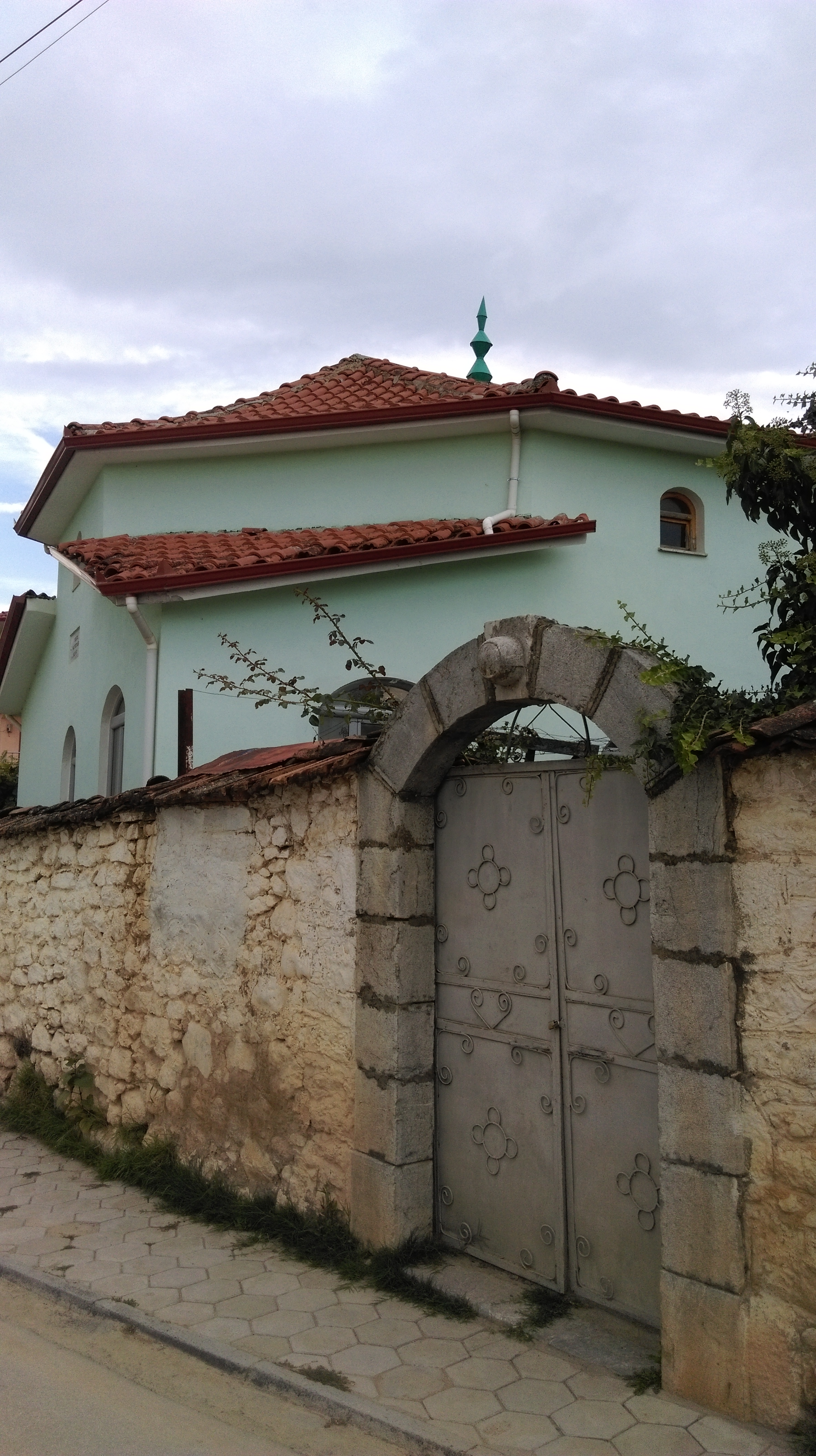
Halveti tekke

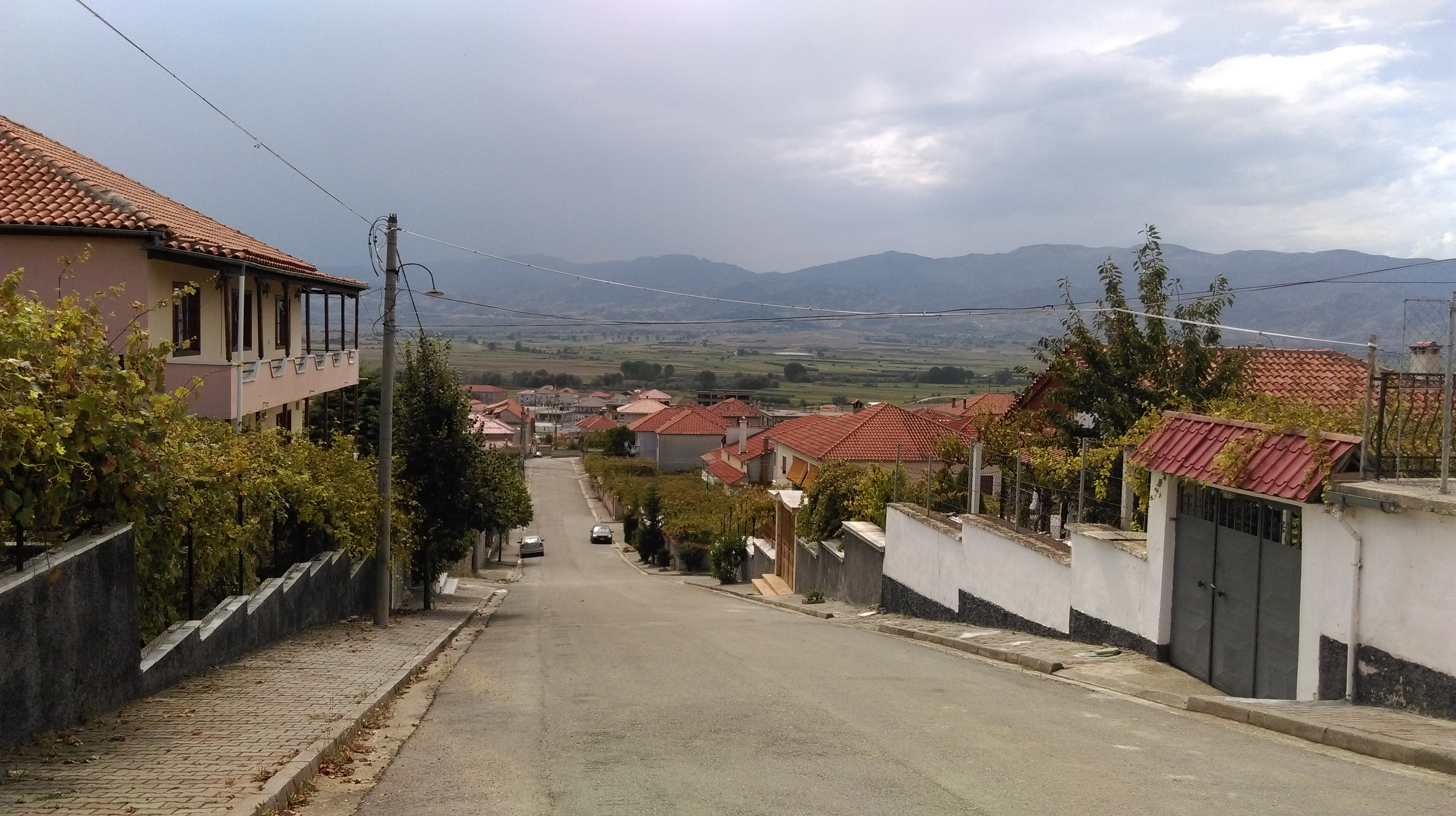
Streetscape in Bilisht

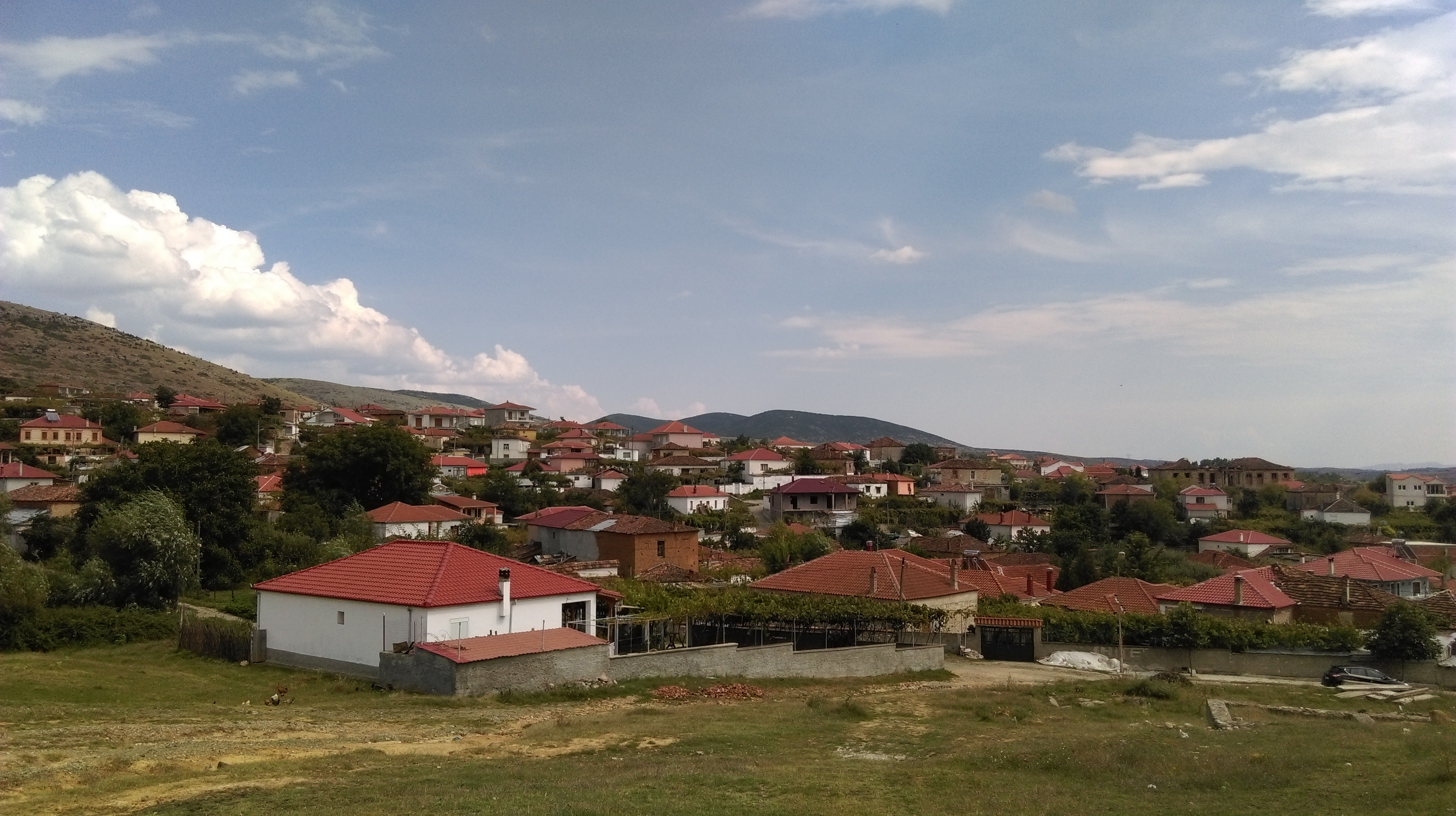
Houses in Bilisht
