= Bitinckë =

- Village
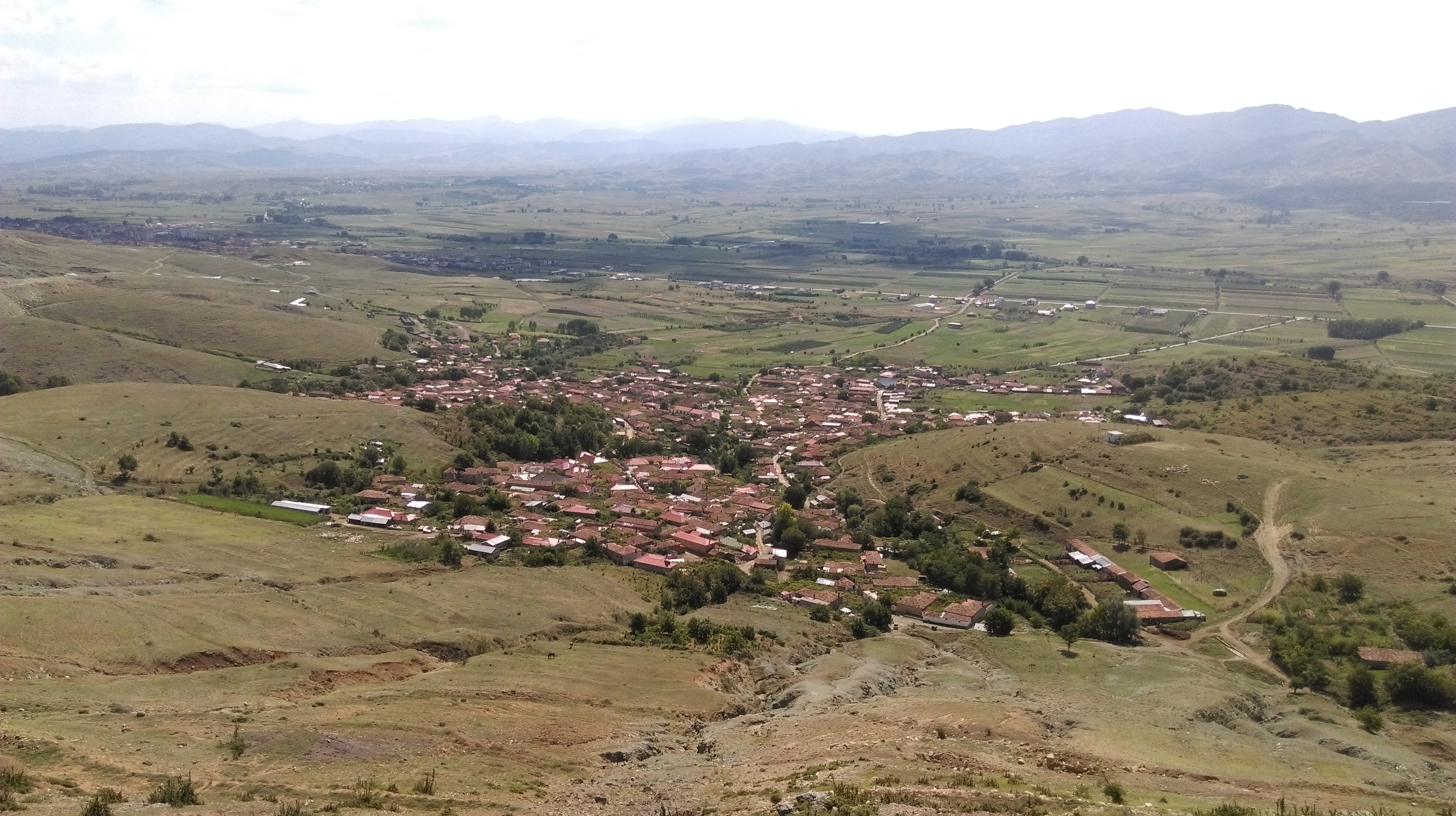

- Location within Albania
- Coordinates: 40°38′52″N 20°59′1″E
- Country: Albania
- County: Korçë
- Municipality: Devoll
- Administrative unit: Bashkia Devoll

Population
  - Total: 2,000
- Time zone: UTC+1 (CET)
  - Summer (DST): UTC+2 (CEST)

Bitinckë is a village in the Korçë County, Albania. At the 2015 local government reform it became part of the municipality Devoll. The village is at 700–1000 metres elevation above sea level.

Bitinckë is the site of an iron-nickel deposit located in one of three such zones in Albania. In addition, Bitinckë is the site of a nickel-silicate deposit, one of two in the country. The mined deposits are connected by a road to the national road (distance of 1 kilometre). The ores of nickel in the area have a thickness of 1–25 metres and contain sizable amounts of both iron and cobalt.

During the communist era, a farming cooperative existed in the village and Bitinckë was visited by Albanian president Enver Hoxha in 1957. Hoxha gave the village a camera to photograph their experiences of the cooperative farm.

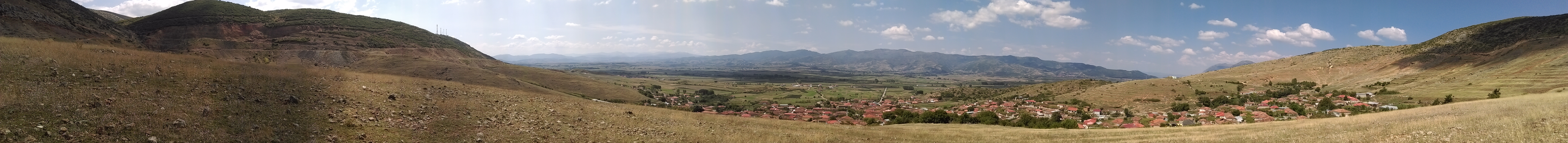
Panorama of Bitinckë showing the iron-nickel deposit (left), the village (centre) and the Devoll plain and Morava mountains (centre background)

== Gallery ==
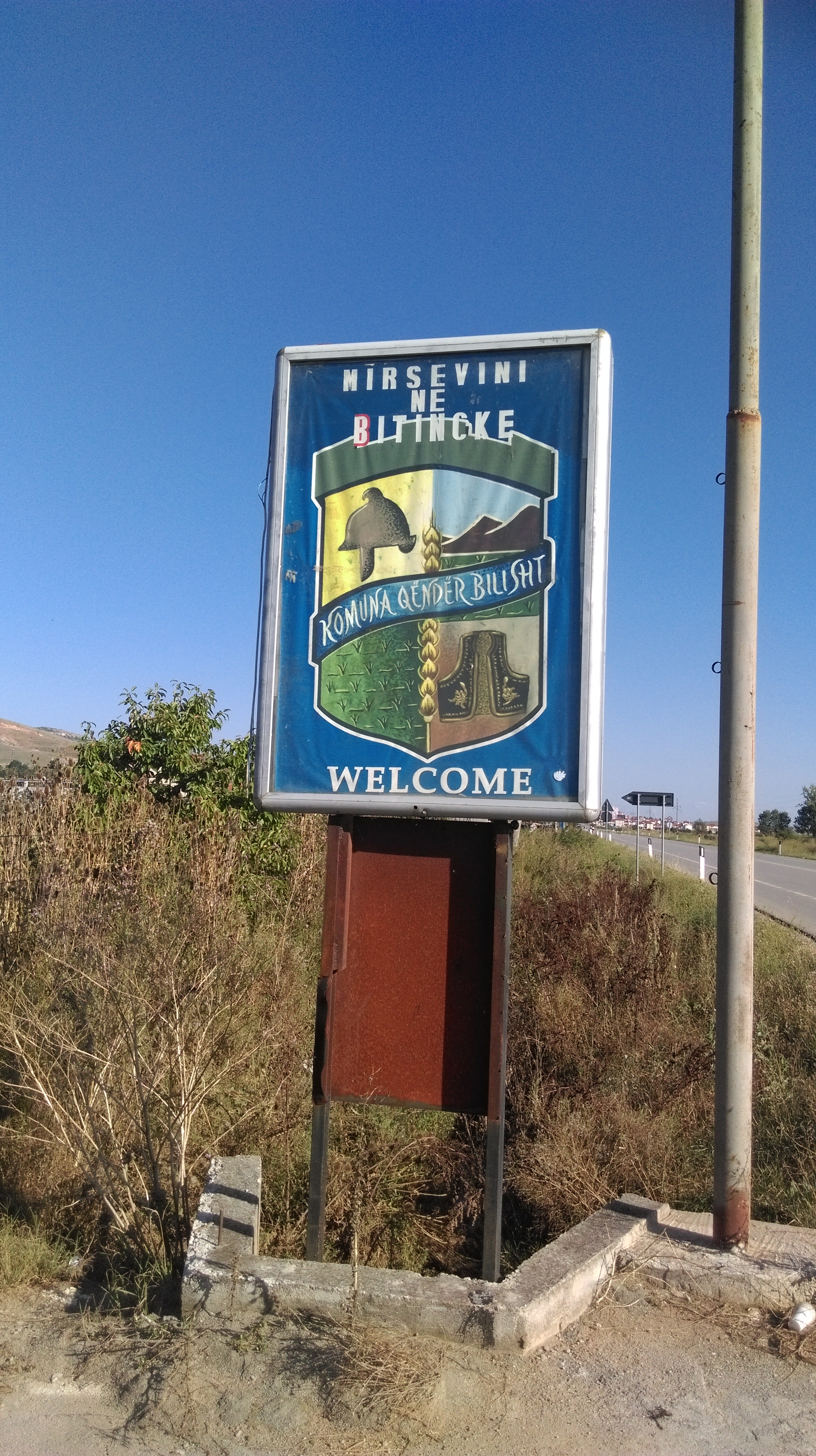
Welcome sign into Bitinckë

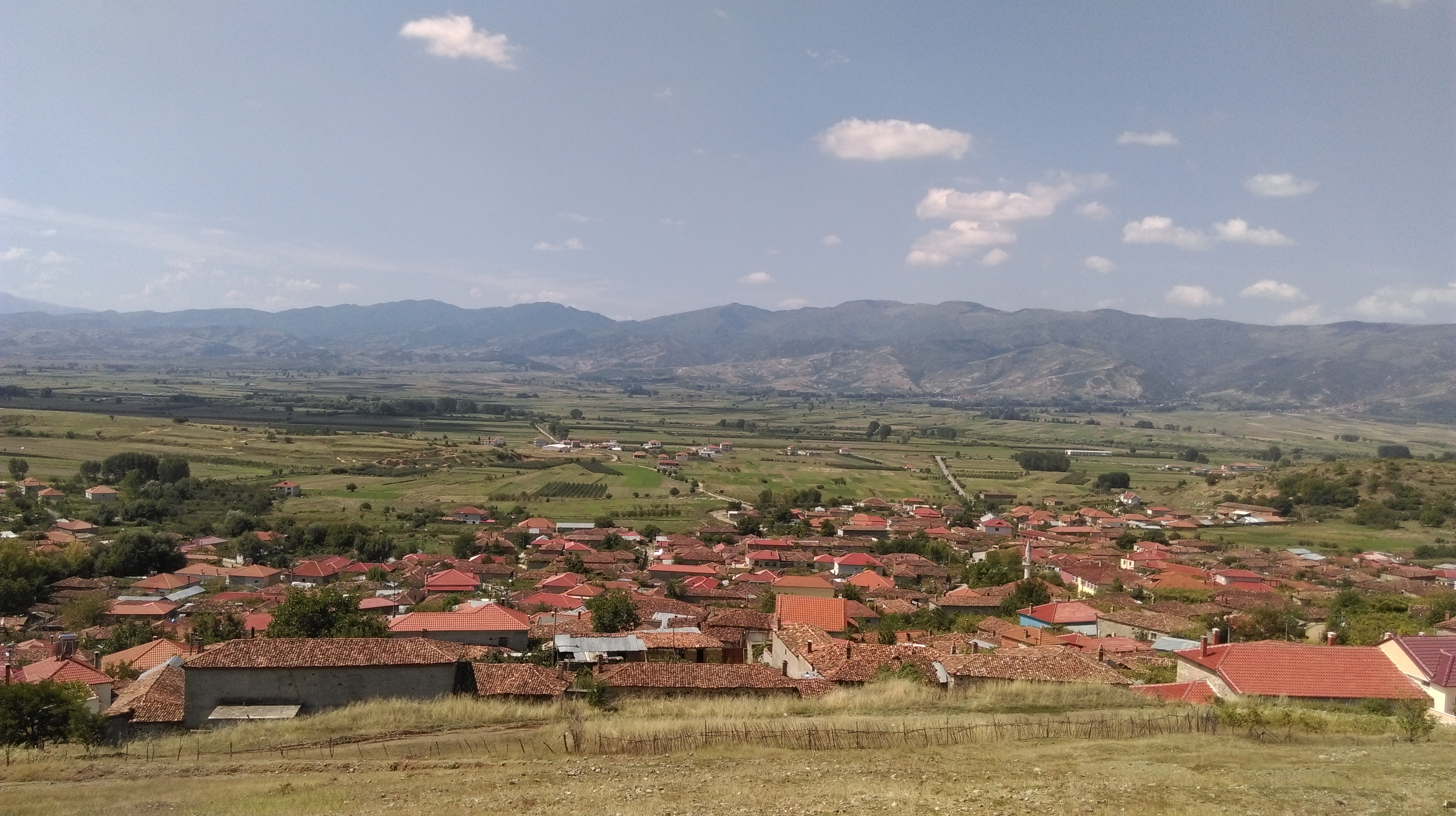
Houses in Bitinckë

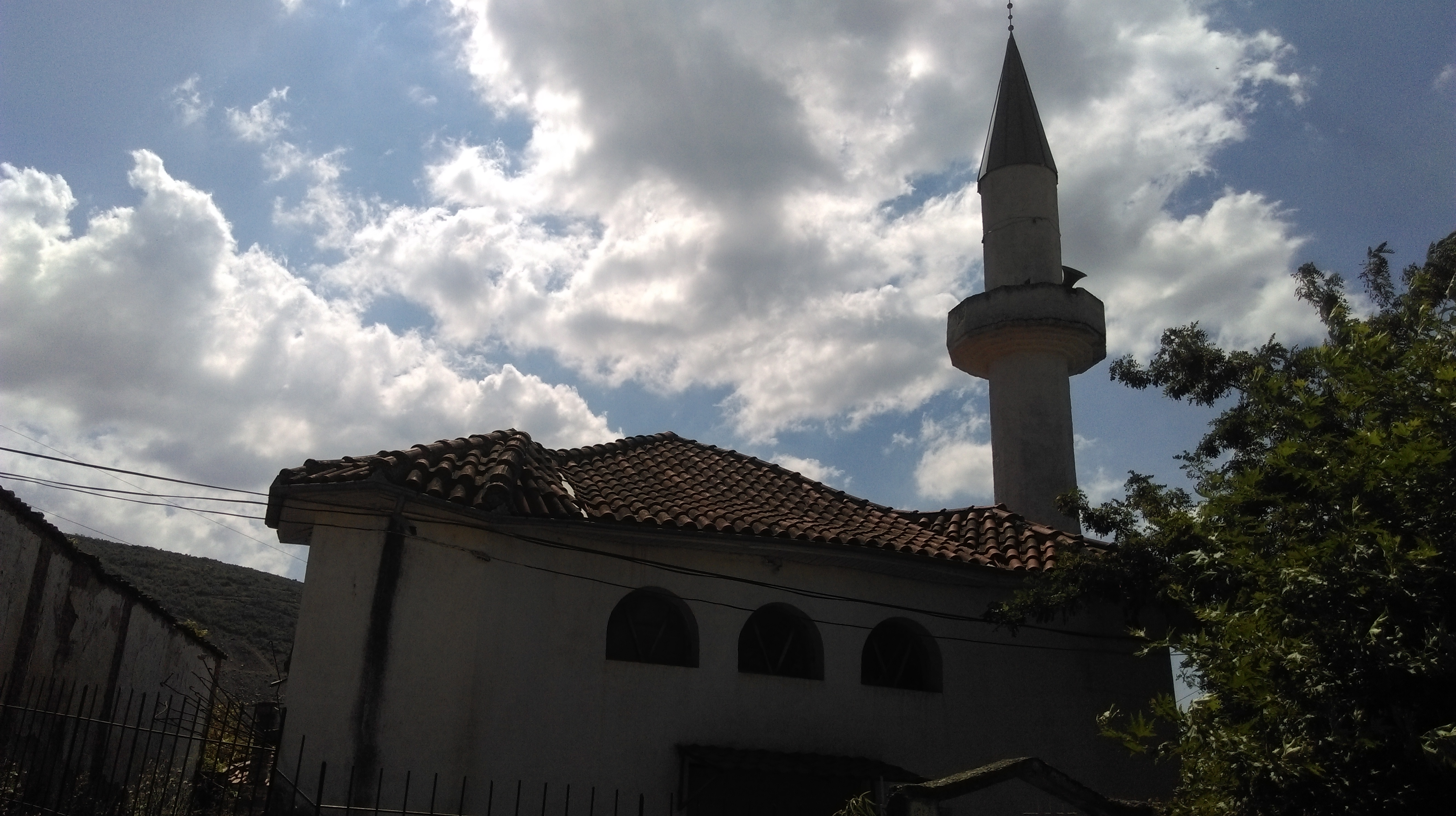
Mosque of Bitinckë

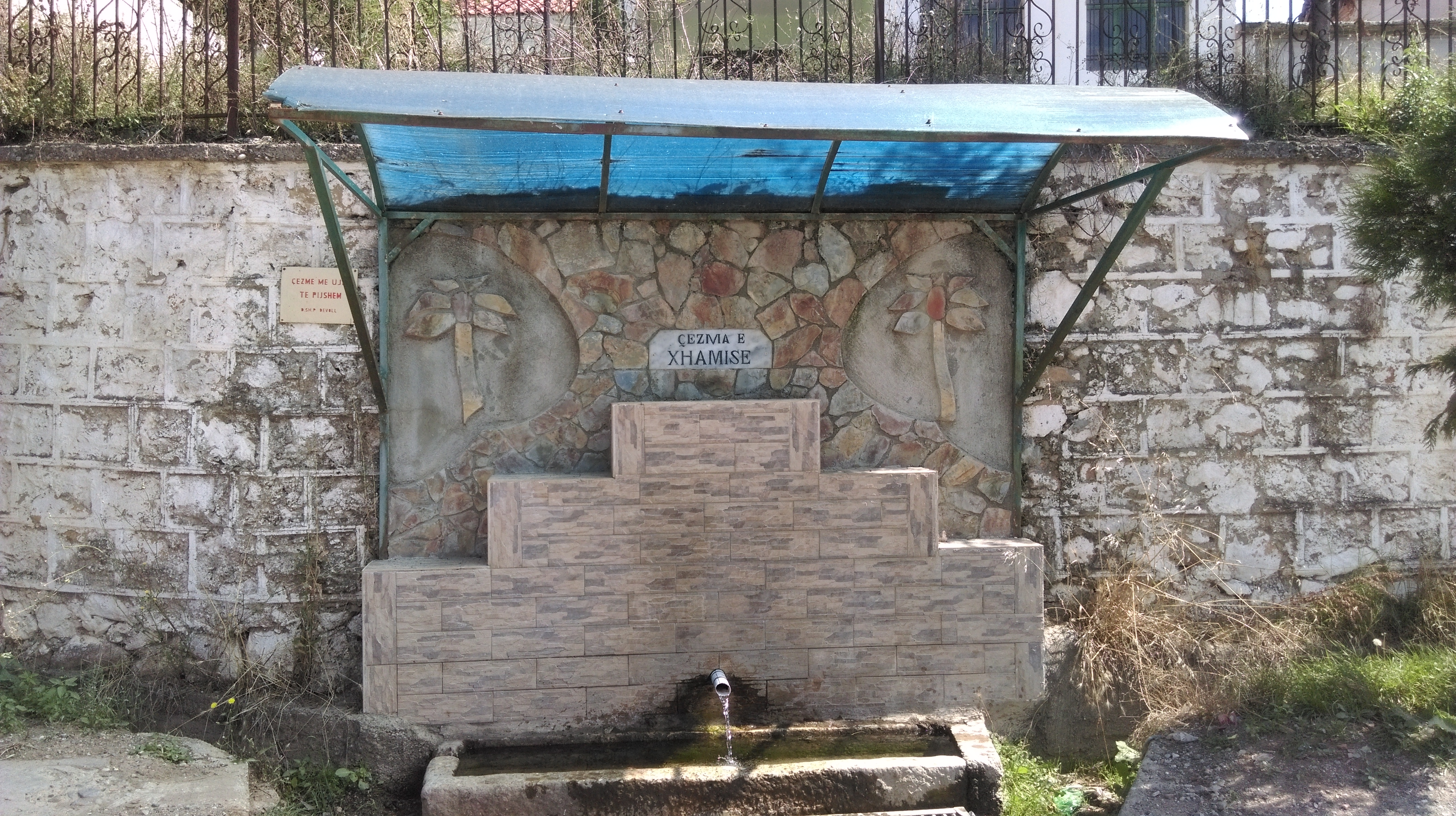
Mosque water fountain

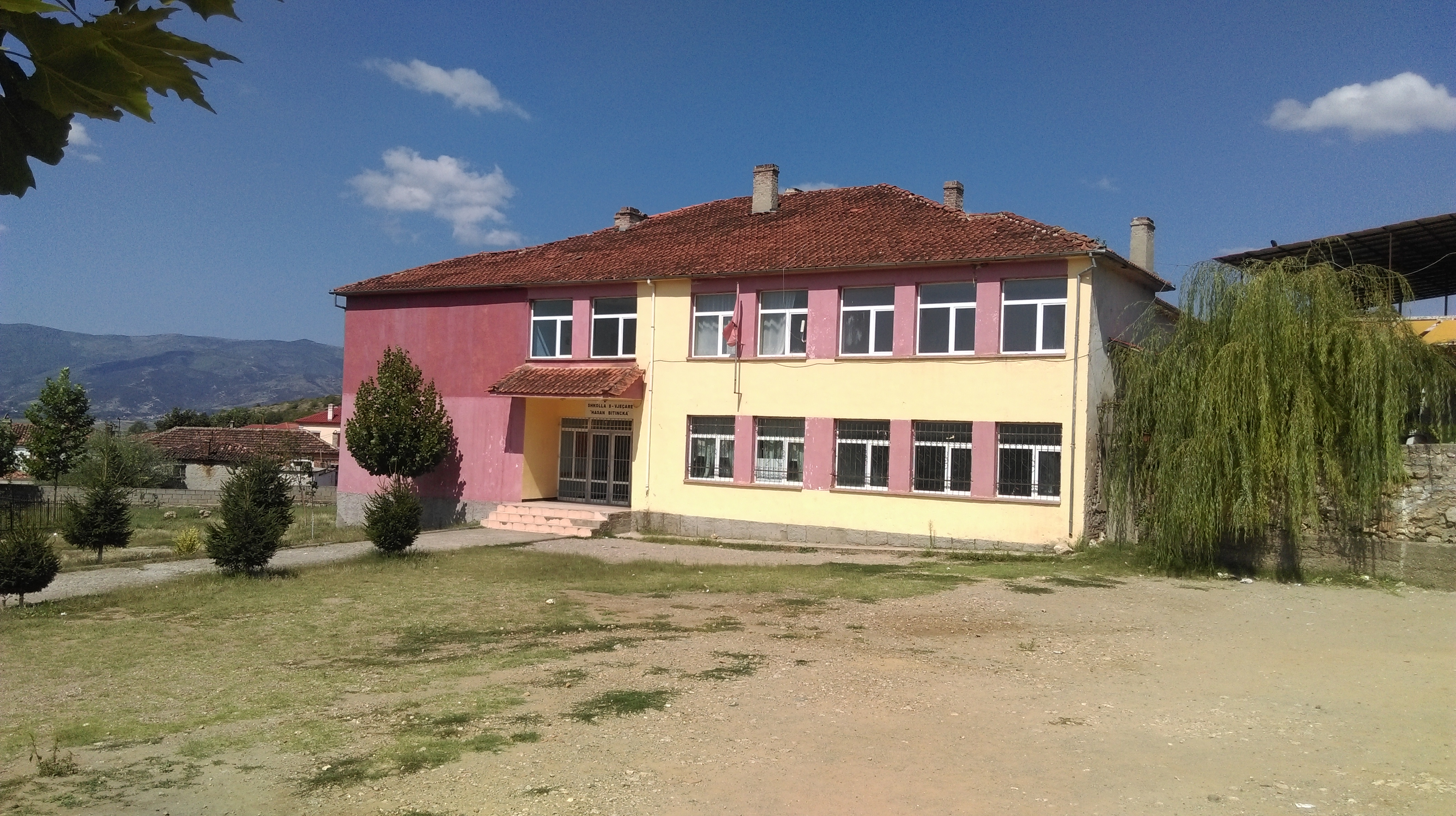
Primary school "Hasan Bitincka"

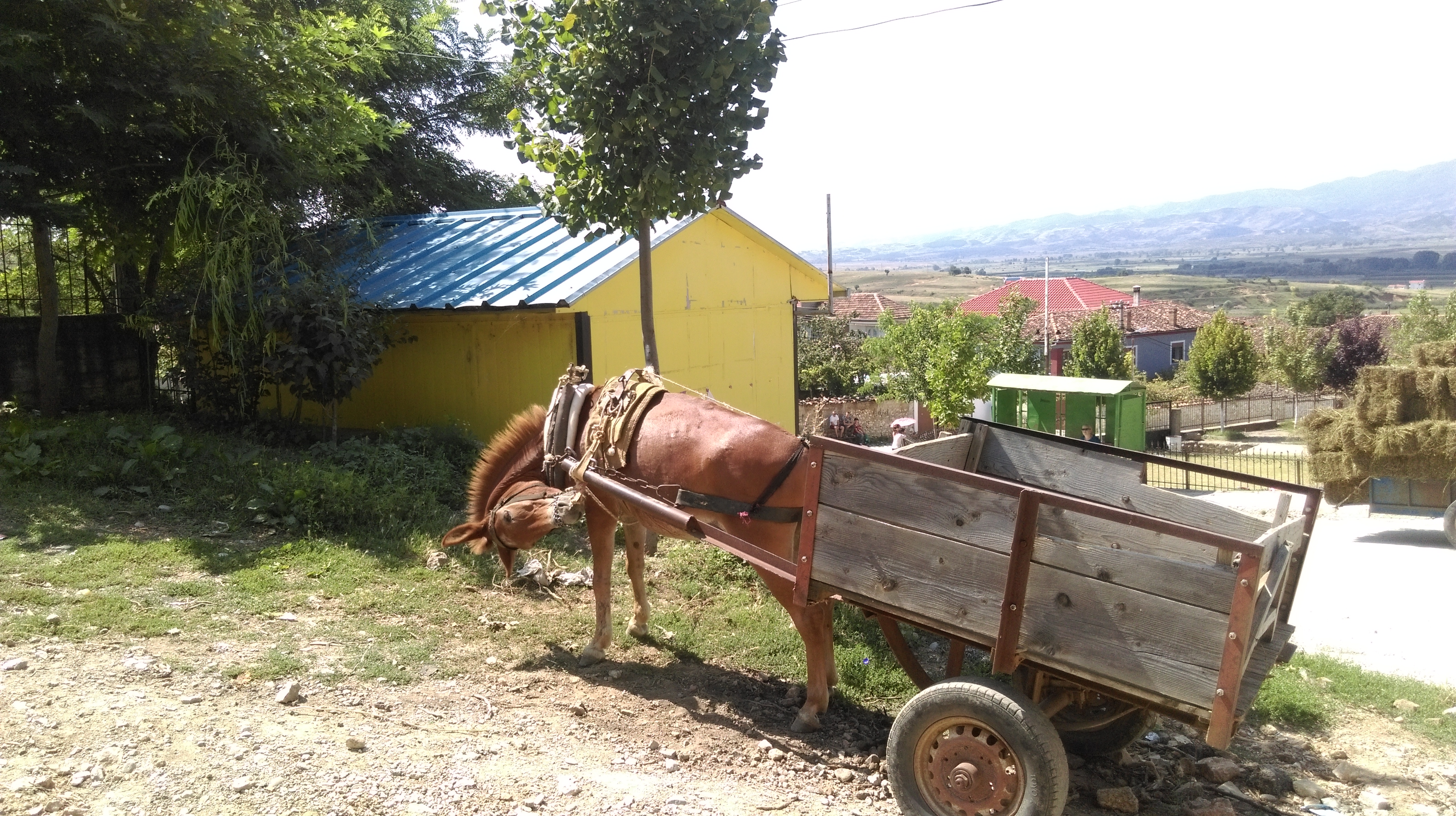
A mule in Bitinckë

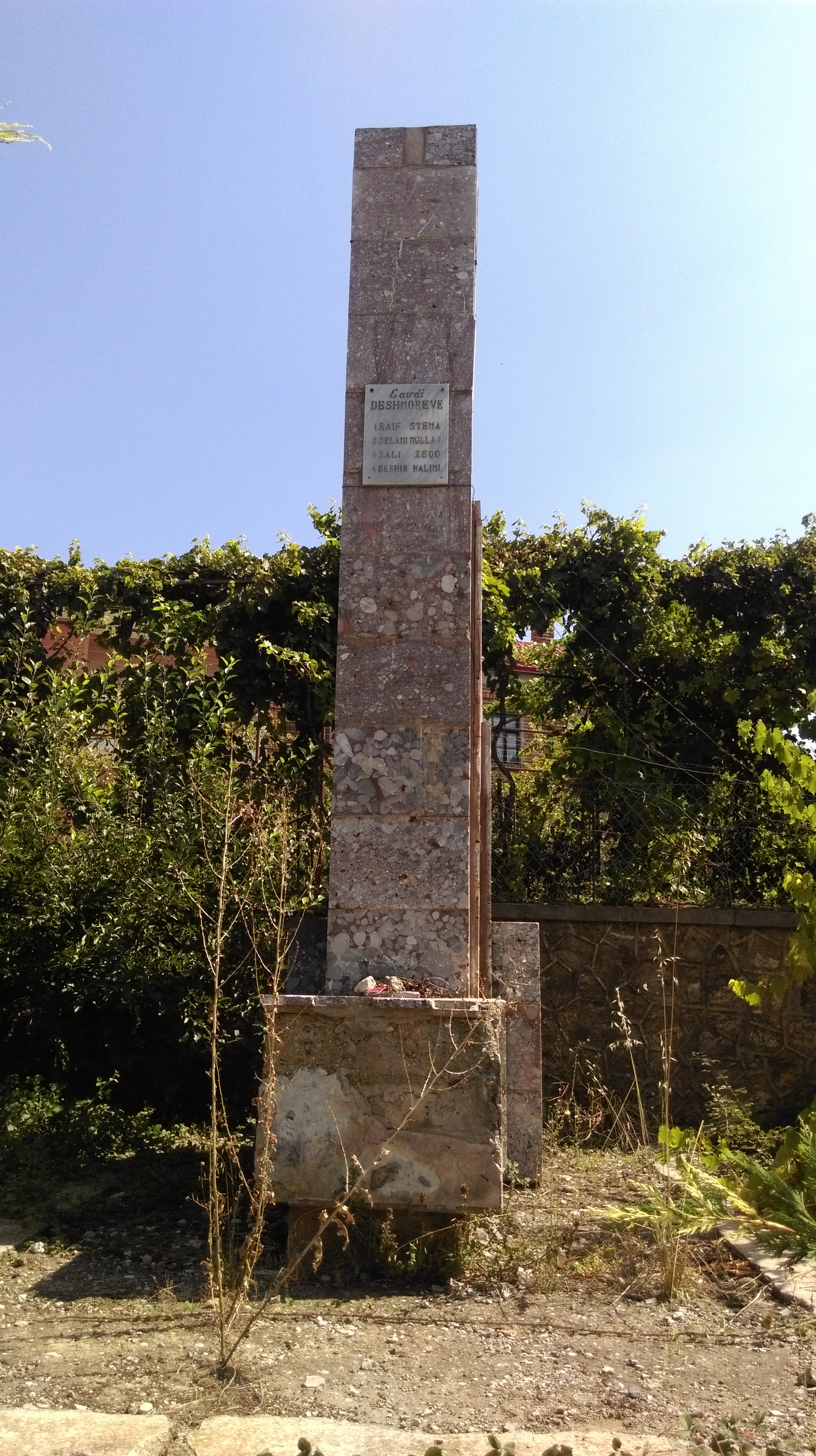
Monument to fallen communist partisans

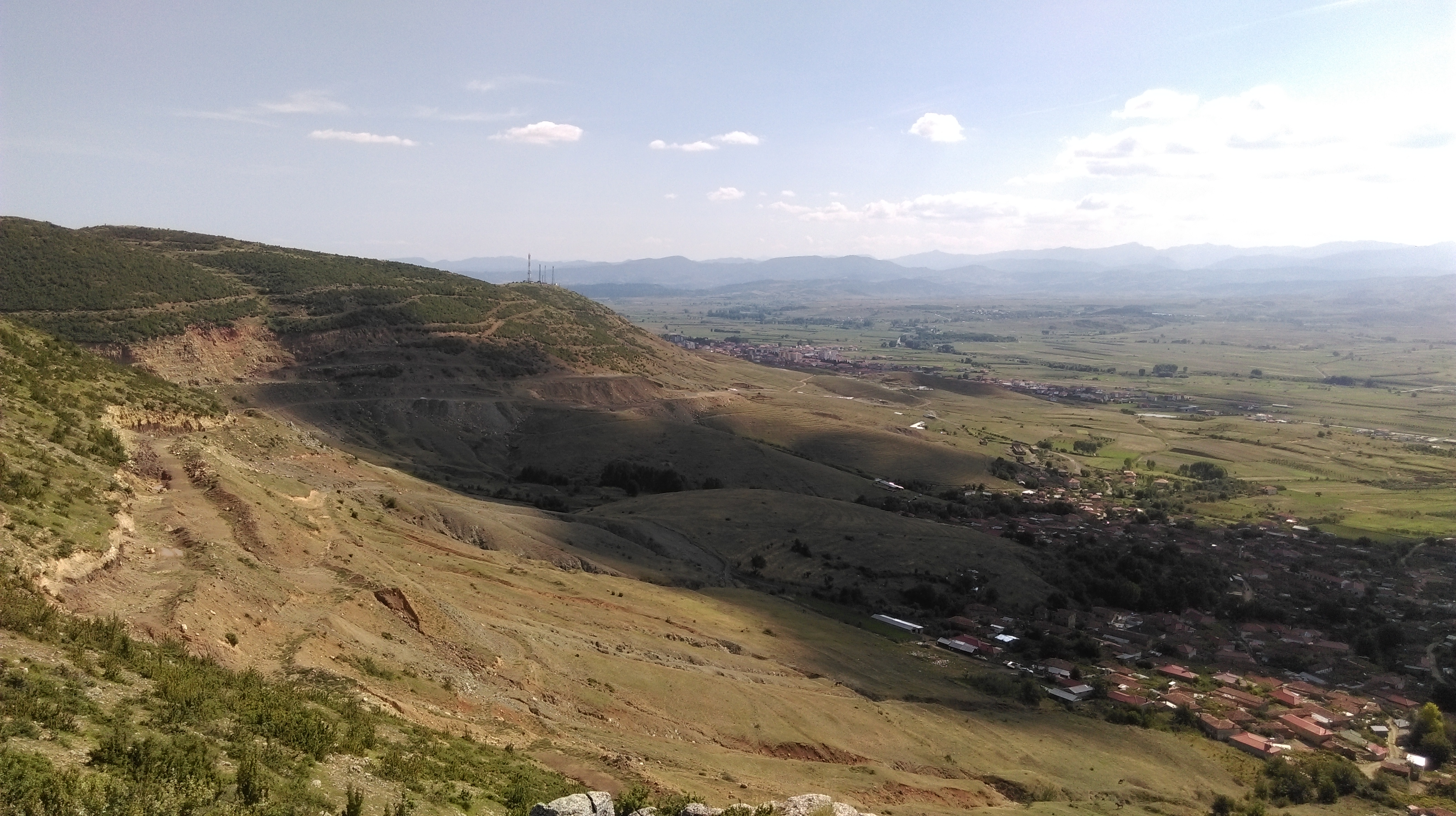
Iron-nickel deposit

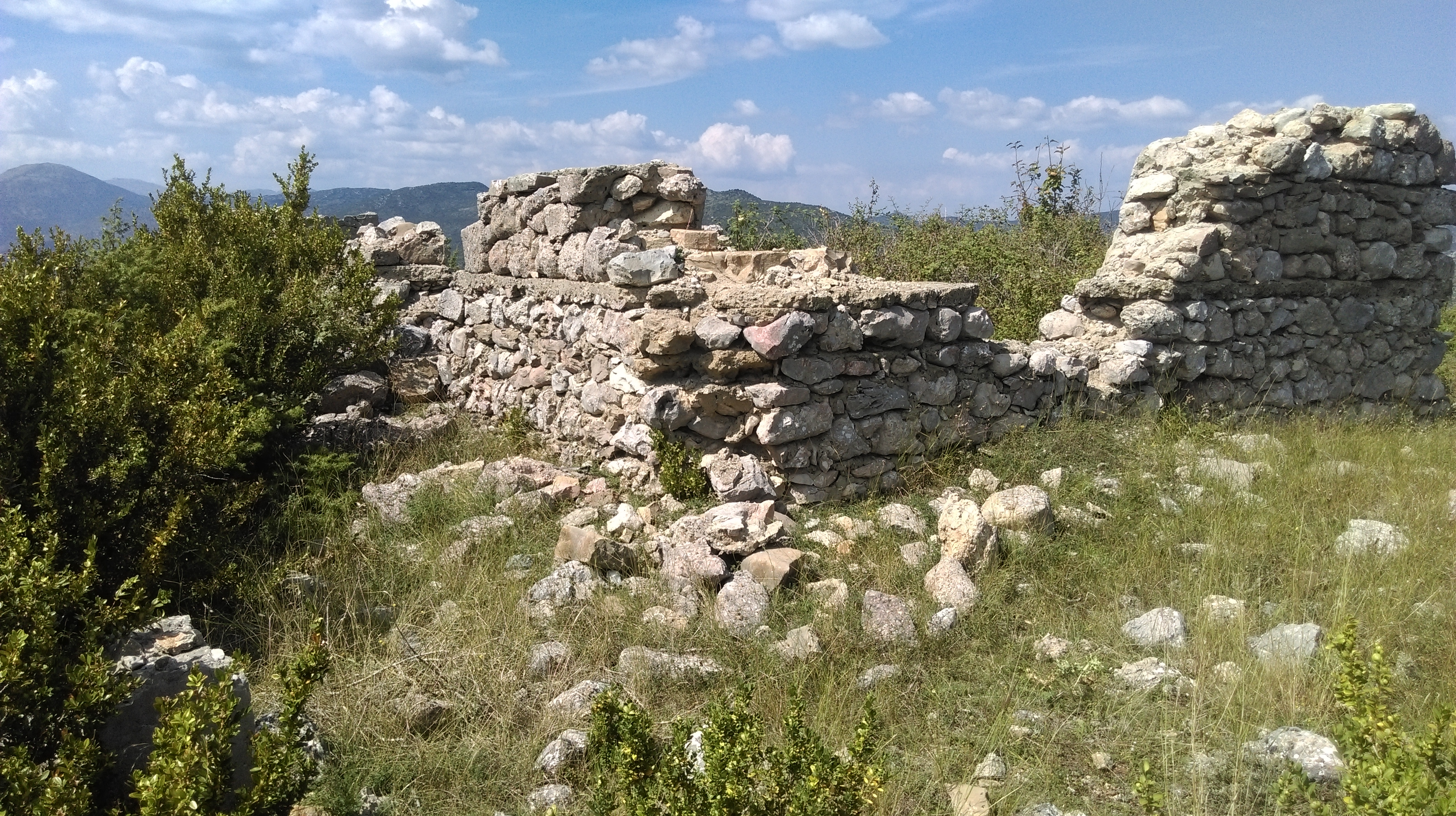
Remnants of communist era guardhouse atop mountain
