= Vernik =

Vernik Врбник
- Village
- Location within Albania
- Coordinates: 40°38′40″N 21°01′26″E
- Country: Albania
- County: Korçë
- Municipality: Devoll
- Administrative unit: Qendër Bilisht

Population (2005)
  - Total: 280
- Time zone: UTC+1 (CET)
  - Summer (DST): UTC+2 (CEST)

Vernik (Albanian definite form: Verniku, Bulgarian: Връбник, Macedonian: Врбник, Vrbnik) is a village in the former Qendër Bilisht Municipality of the Korçë County in Albania, on the border with Krystallopigi in Greece. At the 2015 local government reform it became part of the municipality Devoll. It is situated south of the Small Prespa Lake and is the easternmost settlement of Albania.

== History ==
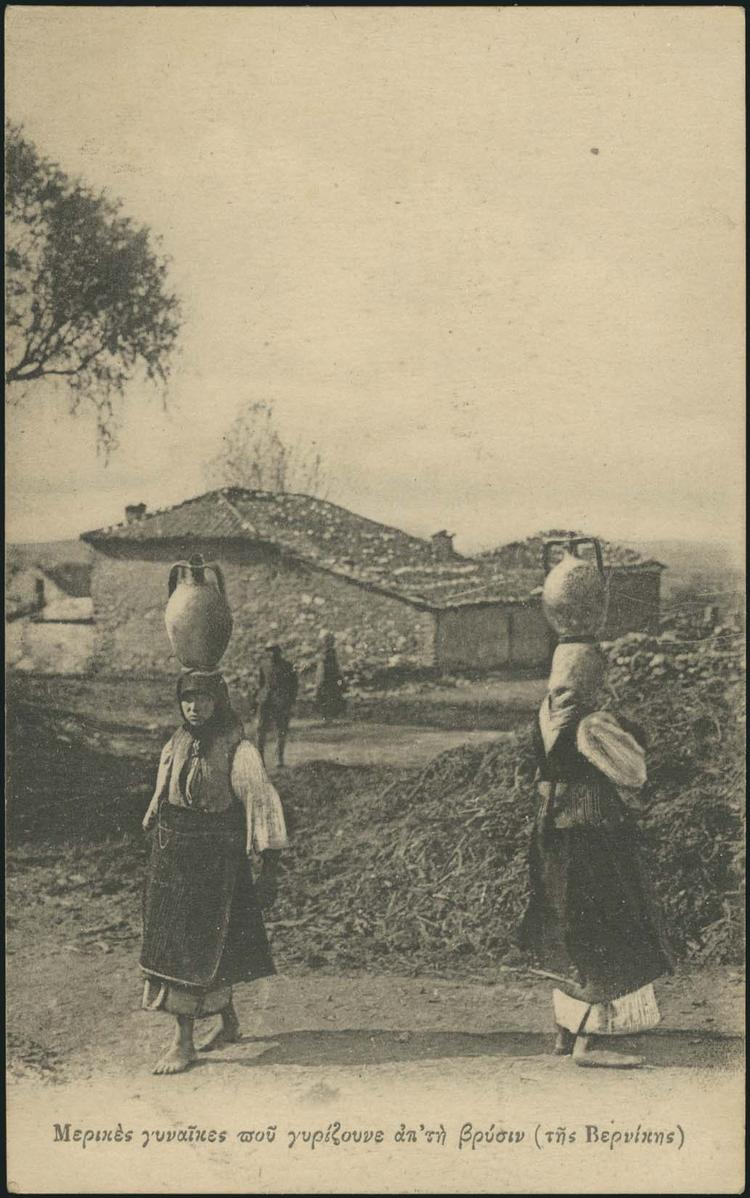
Verniku during World War I

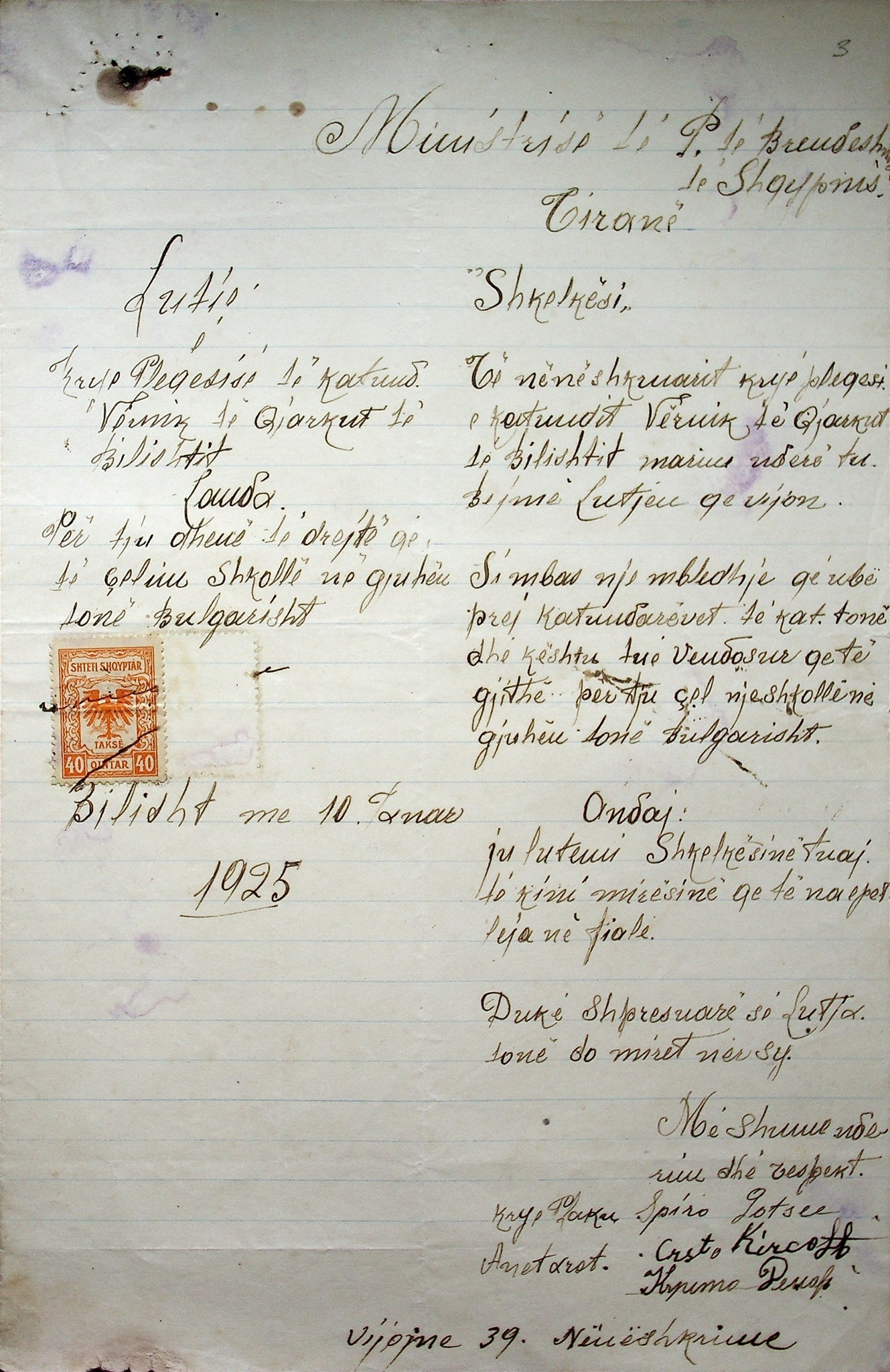
Vrabnik Petition for a Bulgarian School 1925

In 1873, then under the Ottoman Empire, the village was listed twice in a demographic survey, once as a Verlink, containing 86 households and 220 male Bulgarians, and again as Vrbnik, containing 70 households and 205 male Muslims. According to another late 19th century estimate by Vasil Kanchov, the village had 600 Bulgarian Christians.

In 1903, during the Ilinden Uprising, all 80 of the village's houses were burnt down. The population of the village was under the supremacy of the Bulgarian Exarchate since 1904.

At the outbreak of the First Balkan War, Vernik sent six volunteers to join the Macedonian-Adrianopolitan Volunteer Corps.

During World War I, the village was part of Greece. In the 1913 and 1920 censuses, it had 489 and 366 residents, respectively.

In 1925, the village elders sent a petition to the Prefecture of Korça asking for the opening of a Bulgarian school in the village.

In 1939, on behalf of 70 Bulgarian houses in Vrbnik the revolutionary Nikola Pandovski signed a request by the local Bulgarians to the Bulgarian tsaritsa Giovanna requesting her intervention for the protection of the Bulgarian people in Albania - at that time an Italian protectorate.

== Demographics ==
The Kostur dialect of the Macedonian (or Bulgarian) language is spoken in the village.

Due to religion having an influence on identity Macedonians of Vërnik view Orthodox Albanians as nash (ours) while Macedonian-speaking Muslims are not viewed as nash.

== People from Vernik ==
- Nikolaos Dailakis, Greek revolutionary
- Nako Grozdanov (1886 - 1969), member of the Internal Macedonian Revolutionary Organization
- Boncho Nestorov (1906 - 1987), Bulgarian writer and journalist
- Nikola Pandovski, Bulgarian revolutionary, member of the Internal Macedonian Revolutionary Organization
- Kristo Temelko, communist politician
