= Devoll (municipality) =

Municipality in Albania

- Municipality
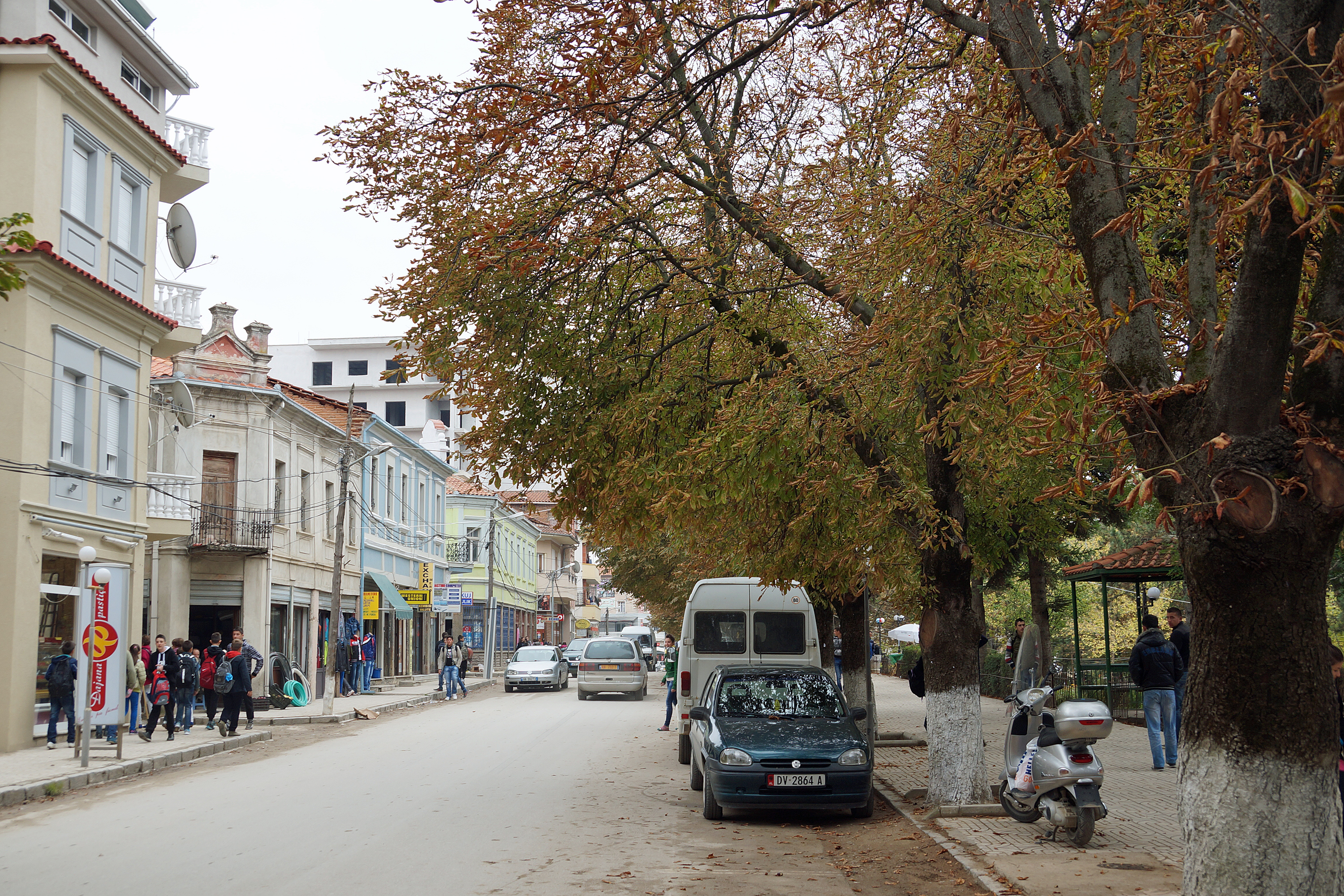
- Center of Bilisht

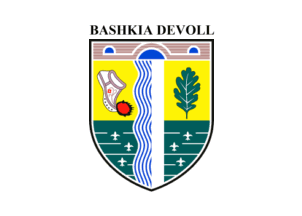
- Flag Emblem

- Location within Albania
- Coordinates: 40°37′16″N 20°59′17″E
- Country: Albania
- County: Korçë
- Seat: Bilisht

Government
  - Mayor: Eduard Duro (PS)

Area
  - Municipality: 453.27 km^{2} (175.01 sq mi)
- Elevation: 917 m (3,009 ft)

Population (2011)
  - Municipality: 26,716
  - Municipality density: 58.941/km^{2} (152.66/sq mi)
- Time zone: UTC+1 (CET)
  - Summer (DST): UTC+2 (CEST)
- Postal Code: 7006
- Area Code: (0)811
- Website: bashkiadevoll.gov.al

Devoll (Albanian: [ˈdɛˈvɔɫ]; Albanian definite form: Devolli) is a municipality in Korçë County, southeastern Albania. The municipality consists of the administrative units of Hoçisht, Miras, Progër and Qendër Bilisht with Bilisht constituting its seat. As of the Institute of Statistics estimate from the 2011 census, there were 26.716 in Devoll Municipality. It derives its name from the Devoll River flowing through the valley. The border point Kapshticë/Krystallopigi connects Devoll with the Greek regional units of Florina and Kastoria to the east and southeast. Devoll borders the municipalities of Kolonjë to the southwest, Korçë to the west, Maliq to the northwest and Pustec to the north. The area of the municipality is 453.27 km^{2} (175.01 sq mi).

== History ==
Excavations at Tren cave unearthed Mycenaean pottery of the Late Bronze Age. This appears to be of possible local manufacture.

The medieval era Devol fortress, then known as Deabolis (Greek: Δέαβολις), was the location where the Treaty of Devol between Bohemond I of Antioch and Byzantine Emperor Alexios I Komnenos was signed in 1108. Its site became forgotten in modern times, however it has been tentatively identified with the site Zvezdë (located at 40°43′N 020°51′E), a conjecture already proposed by the 19th century British traveller William Martin Leake in 1835. Devol fortress was reconquered by the Bulgarian Empire in the beginning of the 13th century, but taken back by the Byzantines in 1259. The fortress continued to play an important role until the 14th century. Its site became forgotten in modern times.

In a text by Emperor John VI Kantakouzenos (r. 1347-1354) whose 'History' covers the years 1320-1356, there is mention of local Albanians; “While the emperor was spending about eight days in Achrida (Ohrid), the Albanian nomads living in the region of Deabolis (Devoll) appeared before him, as well as those from Koloneia (Kolonja) and those from the vicinity of Ohrid.” This meeting was estimated to have taken place at around February 1328.

During the World War I, the Greek army burned several Muslim villages in the region, including Sinicë (Miras). In the events of 1914, one of those killed by the Greek troops was Bektashi Baba Hafiz of the tekke of Kuç. His bloodstained ritual cap was portrayed as a symbol in the tekke for many years after his death.

The chapel in the Blashtonjë cave on the edge of the Small Prespa Lake dates to the 13th century AD. The cave paintings are the oldest artworks which have been found in Albania and the icons in the chapel are among the oldest of their kind in the country.

In late Ottoman times and early Independence era, much of the Christian population emigrated abroad and then returned, and later a part of the Muslim population did the same.

Before the World War II, the Devoll valley was an autonomous district. In the Communist period, it belonged to the Korçë region, which it was separated from in 1990 as part of the reform of administrative divisions. In the territorial reforms of 2015, the municipalities of Devoll region were transformed into the new municipality of Devoll, which was placed within Korçë County.

Today, there is again mass emigration, although this time the local Muslim population is emigrating in larger numbers and higher proportions than the Christian population, a reverse of the "Kurbet" of the previous century.

== Geography ==
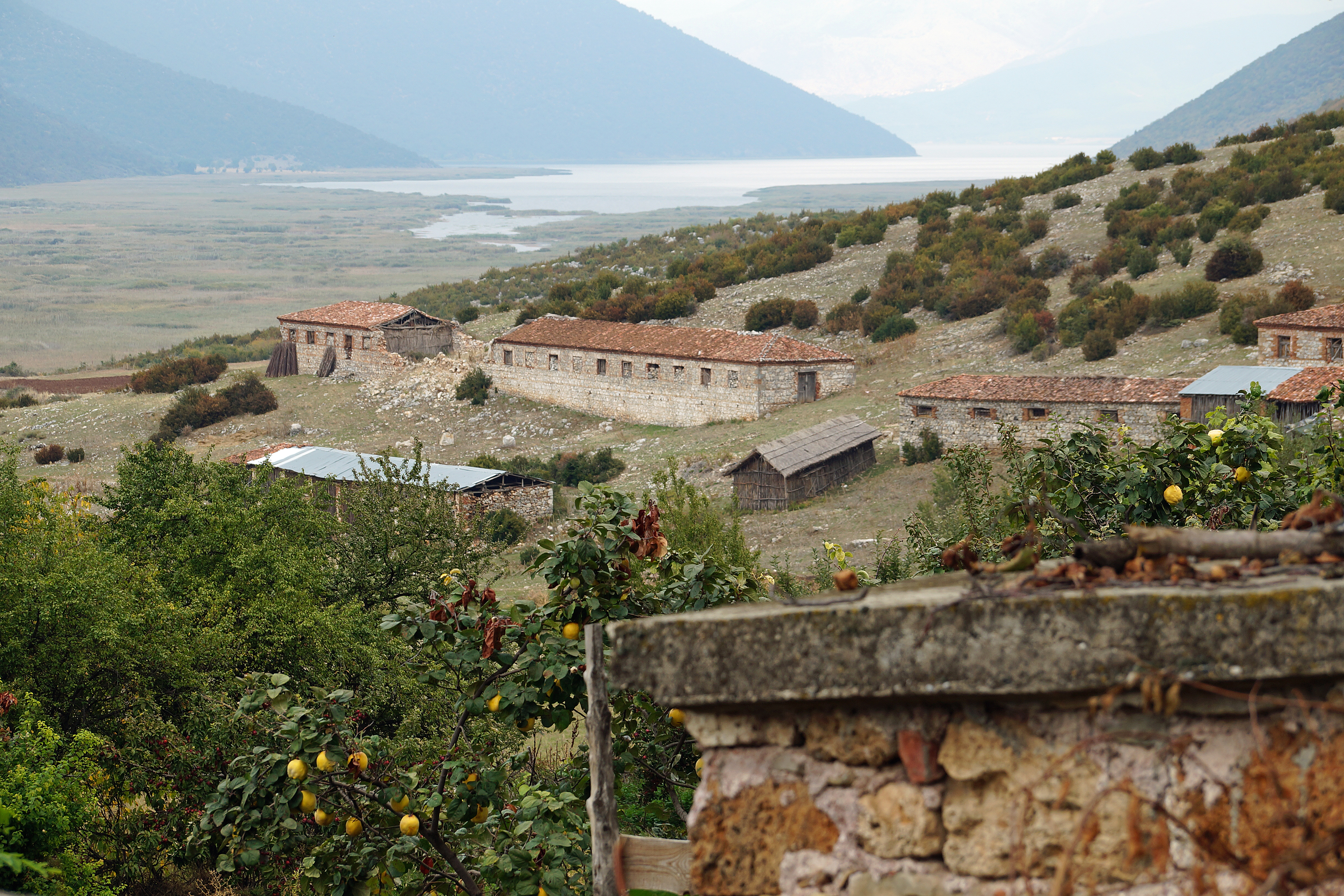
The Small Prespa Lake, at the southwestern end, near the village of Zagradec.

Devoll is located in the southeast of Albania. The border settlement Kapshticë is not far from the easternmost point in Albania. The entire eastern and southern borders of the municipality are also the national border with Greece. On the western and northern sides, the municipality neighbours Kolonjë, Korçë, Maliq and Pustec.

The municipality is located in the upper reaches of the Devoll river, which originates in the southwestern part of the area. Bilisht is located at around 900 m above sea level on a plain which is surrounded on all sides by mountains. The bordertown of Kapshticë is located at a height of 1048 m mountain pass. The western border is formed by the Malet e Moravës mountain range, whose highest mountain is the 1806 m high Maja e Lartë. The city of Korçë lies on the other side of this mountain range. There are only three passes through these mountains. In the northwest, the Devoll flows through a narrow canyon into the Plain of Korçë. In the northeast a long arm of the Small Prespa Lake stretches almost all the way to the Plain of Bilisht. In the southeast, the plain breaks off here and there almost imperceptibly into the Kore river valley, which cuts through the mountains here. This river, which is a tributary of the Haliacmon, makes a detour through Albanian territory of about 5 km (3.1 mi). The few square kilometres of its drainage basin located in Albania are the only part of Albania which drains into the Aegean Sea rather than the Adriatic or Ionian Seas.

The Plain of Bilisht has been made fertile by means of numerous irrigation canals. As a result of heavy rainfall and spring snow melt, the water flows out of the Small Prespa Lake through a natural outlet, into the Devoll and then directly into the Adriatic. From the 1950s, until around 2000, the Devoll was redirected into the Small Prespa Lake during floods. The excess water was used to irrigate the Korçë Plain.

In the mountains east of Bilisht, along the Greek border, there are rich nickel deposits, concentrated in two main deposits, at Verniku and Kapshtica West.

== Demography ==
The population is overwhelmingly ethnically Albanian, with the majority of Albanians there having been Muslim at the end of the Ottoman era, while a minority of the Albanians, especially those that resided especially in high altitude areas, remained Orthodox Christian. The Albanian Christian population lives mostly in the upper valley of the Devoll river, in the town of Hoçisht, in Bilisht and in the village of Tren, and insist on being called only Albanian and not Greek.

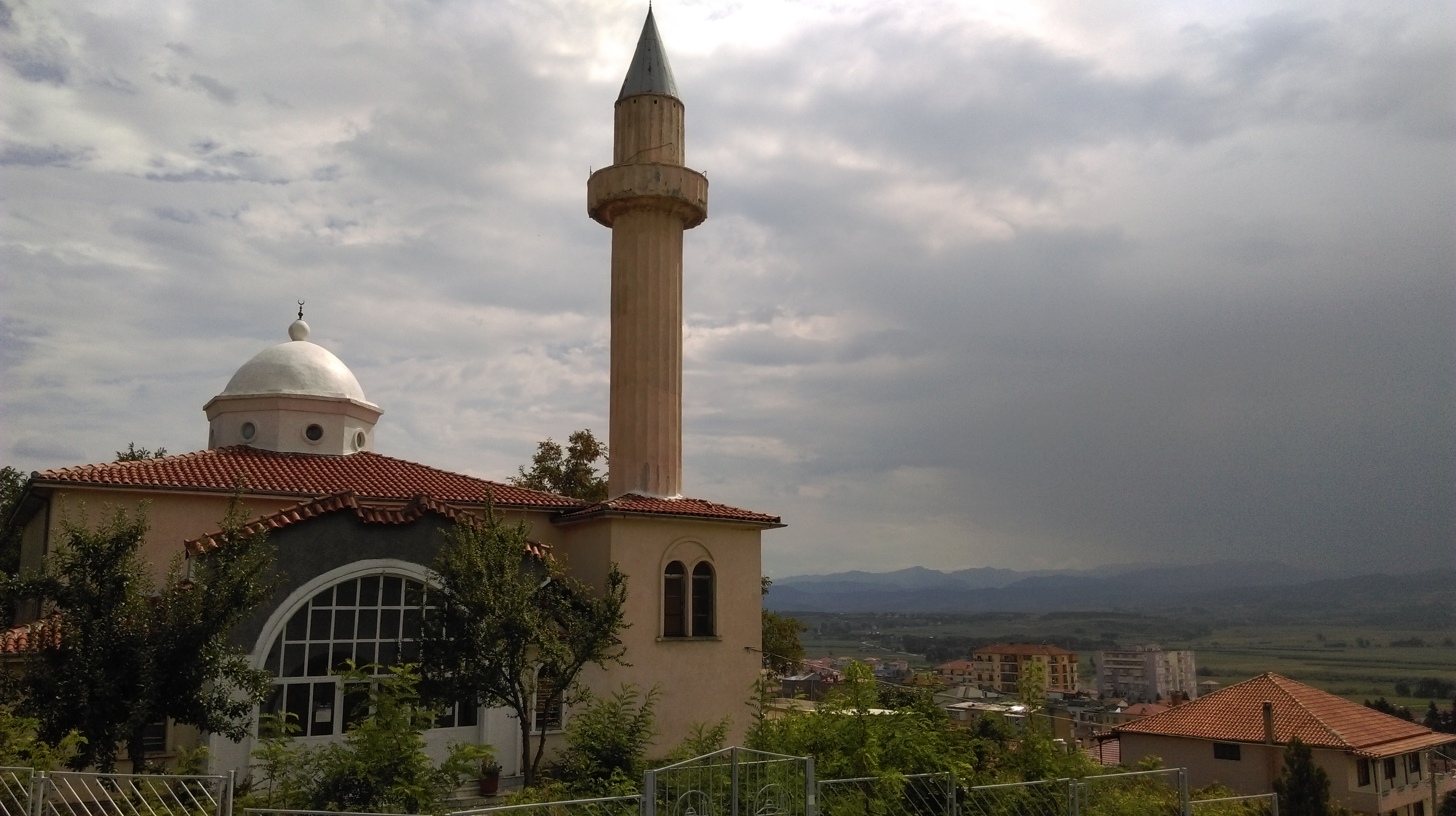
Bilisht, its mosque and houses and the Devoll plain in the far background

In the region there are small numbers of Aromanians with further numbers of Greeks. Post-communism, a part of the original Albanian Muslim population has converted to Orthodoxy as part of emigration to Greece.

There are also Roma present as well as Macedonians in the village of Vërnik. The Slavic-speakers of Vernik identify as Aegean Macedonians and refuse any Bulgarian or other identity. The Roma are mainly Muslim while the Macedonians are Orthodox Christians. In modern times, among the Albanian population, there has been extensive intermarriage between the Muslim and Christian populations, with the result being that many of the ethnically Albanian youth in the area identity with both traditions, as "half-Muslim, half-Christian". Like elsewhere in Albania, actual religious observance is typically lax although due to Ottoman history even among some non-practicers, religious identity may still plays a role in social relations, being more significant among the older generations.

The Albanian population speaks with a Tosk dialect, while the Macedonian population speaks the Kostur dialect. The entire Slavic-speaking Macedonian population is also bilingual in Albanian nowadays.

== Economy ==
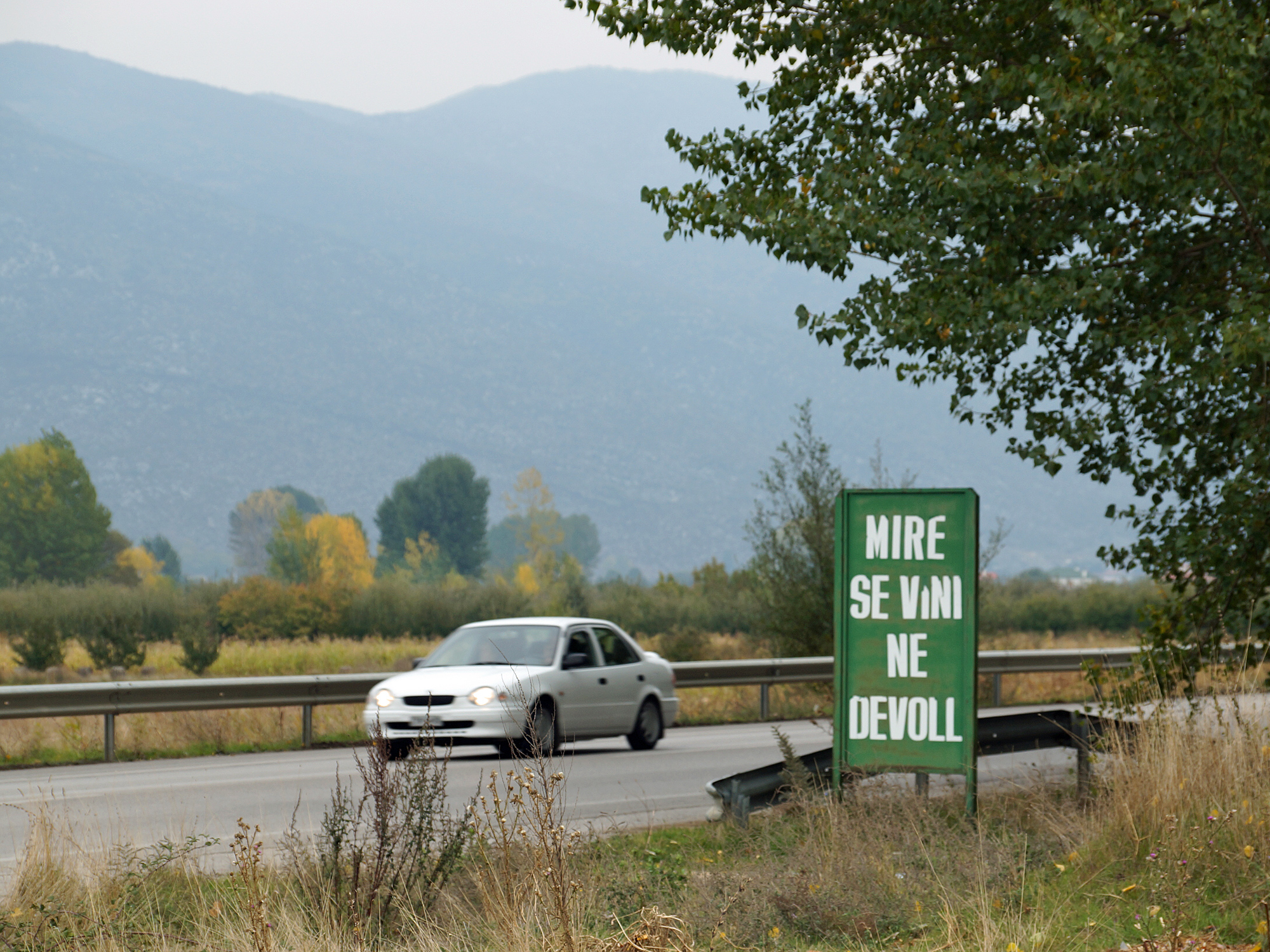
Border sign of the old region

The border settlement of Kapshticë is among the most important routes from Albania into Greece. As a result, the whole region, which is isolated from the rest of Albania, is heavily dedicated to border trade with Greece. Despite being a primarily agricultural area a large service industry has developed around the border trade. In particular, many young men of this area worked in Greece in the 1990s, mostly illegally, in order to escape the poverty at home. Subsequently, it often happened that their families have joined them.

== List of Mayors ==
Mayors who have served since the Albanian Declaration of Independence of 1912:

No.	Name	Term in office
1	Etem Osmani	1921	1924
2	Etem Osmani	1926	1926
3	Etem Osmani	1936	1937
4	Faik Babani	1939	1939
5	Sali Shehu	1944	1944
Executive Committee (1944–1992)
6	Shefqet Fifo	1962	1963
7	Myftar Grabocka	1964	1964
8	Shefqet Fifo	1966	1966
9	Myzafer Sulejmani	1966	1966
10	Meleq Babani	1969	1969
11	Gjergj Grazhdani	1974	1985
12	Shpëtim Qyta	1986	1990
13	Besnik Diko	1992	1998
14	Avdyl Spaho	1998	2000
15	Arben Graca	2000	2003
16	Valter Miza	2003	2014
17	Bledjon Nallbati	2015	2019
18	Eduard Duro	2019

== Municipal Council ==
Seat distribution in the Municipal Council

Following the 2023 local elections, the composition of the Council of Devoll is as follows:

Name	Abbr.	Seats
Socialist Party of Albania; Partia Socialiste e Shqipërisë	PS	9
Together We Win; Bashkë Fitojmë	BF	4
Democratic Party of Albania; Partia Demokratike e Shqipërisë	PD	2
Party for Justice, Integration and Unity; Partia Drejtësi, Integrim dhe Unitet	PDIU	2
Legality Movement Party; Lëvizja e Legalitetit	PLL	1
National Front Party; Partia Balli Kombëtar	PBK	1
Environmentalist Agrarian Party; Partia Agrare Ambientaliste	AAP	1
Festim Kaso; Independent		1

== Bibliography ==
- Bejko, Lorenc (2016). "Social Landscape and Tumuli Burials in Late Bronze and Early Iron Age Southeastern Albania". In Henry, Oliver; Kelp, Ute (eds.). Tumulus as Sema: Space, Politics, Culture and Religion in the First Millennium BC. De Gruyter. doi:10.1515/9783110267501. ISBN 978-3-11-025990-2.
- Gilles de Rapper (2002). "Grenzen überschreiten. Migration in der albanischen Grenzregion Devoll". In Karl Kaser; Robert Pichler; Stephanie Schwander-Sievers (eds.). Die weite Welt und das Dorf. Albanische Emigration am Ende des 20. Jahrhunderts = Zur Kunde Südosteuropas: Albanologische Studien. Vol. Bd. 3. Wien: Böhlau-Verlag. ISBN 3-205-99413-2.
- Gilles de Rapper (2008). Religion in Post-communist Albania – Muslims, Christians and the idea of 'culture' (Devoll, Southern Albania) (PDF). Anthropological Notebooks. Vol. 14. pp. 31–45.
