= Kapshticë =

- Village
- Location within Albania
- Coordinates: 40°36′9″N 21°0′36″E
- Country: Albania
- County: Korçë
- Municipality: Devoll
- Administrative unit: Qendër Bilisht
- Time zone: UTC+1 (CET)
  - Summer (DST): UTC+2 (CEST)
- Postal Code: 7006

Kapshticë is a settlement in the Korçë County, southeastern Albania. It is part of the former municipality Qendër Bilisht. At the 2015 local government reform it became part of the municipality Devoll. The village lies near the border crossing with Greece.
