= Georgios Theocharis =

Georgios Theocharis may refer to:

- Georgios Theocharis (diplomat)
- Georgios Theocharis (footballer)
