= Kefalari =

Kefalari (Greek: Κεφαλάρι) may refer to several places in Greece:

- Kefalari, Attica, a subdivision of the municipality of Kifisia in suburban Athens
- Kefalari, Argolis
- Kefalari, Corinthia, a village in Corinthia
- Kefalari, Kastoria
