= Delinanios Folklore Museum =

- Δεληνάνειο Λαογραφικό Μουσείο
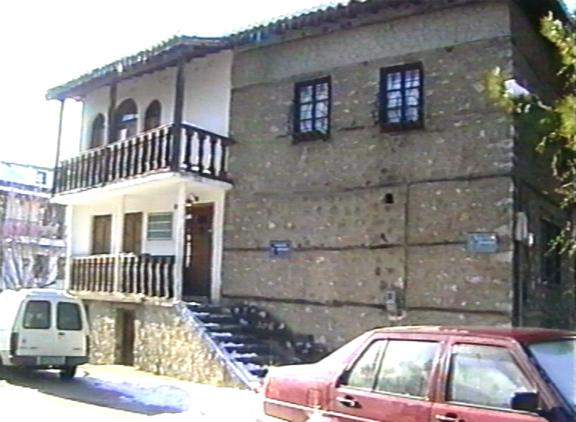
- Outside view
- Established: November 1997
- Location: Kastoria, Greece
- Coordinates: 40.51668016969946°N 21.271845794382607°E
- Type: Art museum
- Owner: Municipality of Kastoria

The Delinanios Folklore Museum (Greek: Δεληνάνειο Λαογραφικό Μουσείο) is a museum in Kastoria, West Macedonia, Greece.

== History ==
The museum opened in November 1997. It was set up by the Progressive Ladies' Association and is housed in a three-storey 19th-century traditional town-house in the Doltso district, which belongs to the municipality of Kastoria and located at 12 Riga Fereou Street.

The purpose of the museum is to highlight cultural heritage, to perpetuate folk culture, and to illustrate Kastorian hospitality.

== Exhibits ==
On the first floor are the everyday room and the summer bedroom and on the second floor the main sitting room and the winter bedroom. They display a rich collection of women's and men's clothing (mainly formal local costumes), underwear, needlework and embroidery, handwoven textiles, and a rich collection of family photographs and women's portraits from Kastorian communities abroad. All the exhibits date to the 19th and early 20th centuries. On the ground floor there is quite a rich collection of domestic utensils.

== Gallery ==
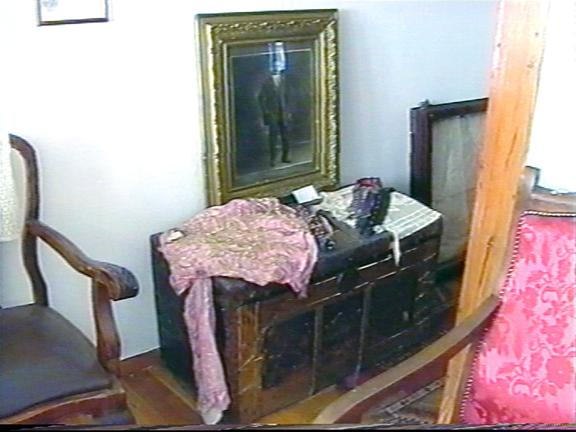
View from the interior

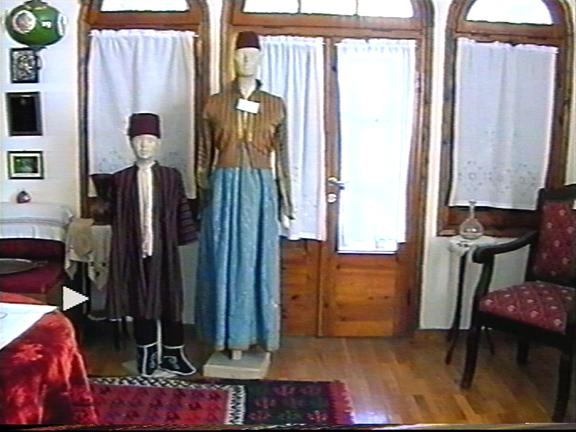
Local costumes

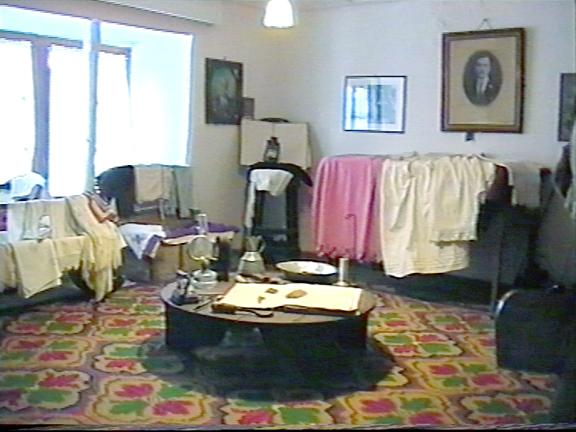
The main sitting room
