= Panagia Koumpelidiki =

- Greek: Παναγία Κουμπελίδικη
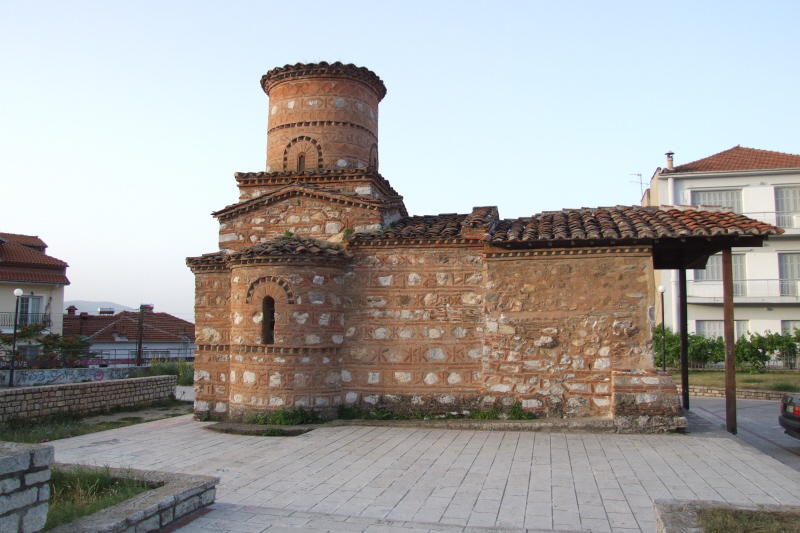
- Panagia Koumpelidiki
- 40.5181°N 21.2688°E
- Location: Kastoria
- Country: Greece
- Denomination: Greek Orthodox

History
- Status: Church

Architecture
- Style: Byzantine architecture
- Groundbreaking: 9th or 11th century

Administration
- Metropolis: Kastoria

Panagia Koumpelidiki (Greek: Παναγία Κουμπελίδικη) is one of the oldest churches in Kastoria, Greece and is considered to be both typical and unique. There is no information left on the name of the patron, the architect or the reason for the building of the church. Many opinions exist on the age of the church. While all dating efforts until today have failed, archaeologists managed to define a timeframe within which the church was built. Based on this time frame, the church is placed between the 9th and 11th century.

The church is a Triconch Temple, located in the acropolis of Kastoria, inside the Justinian Walls, and is the only one in town with a dome, from which it took its name. Koumpelidiki comes from the Turkish word koubeb meaning "dome" or "domed building". The name of the church means "Church of the Virgin with the Little Dome" and it is devoted to the Virgin Mary.

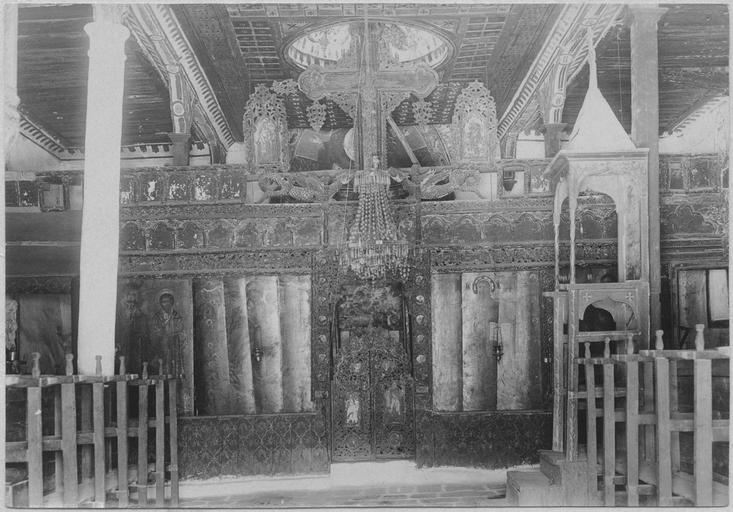
1910's

It is a small church, its size is typical to a chapel in a traditional Byzantine church. Another typical feature is a cloisonné masonry of the exterior. Like the other Kastoria churches, Panagia's interior has fresco paintings rather than mosaics.

The original interior decoration dates back to the period 1260-1280. Two more layers of wall paintings followed, one in the 15th and one in the 17th century. The external wall painting are placed in 1496.

In the arch of the inner narthex stands the most remarkable and rare piece of wall painting, the depiction of the Holly Trinity. This mural reflects the doctrine of the Catholic Church, according to which the Holy Spirit proceeds 'from Father and Son', a fact that leads us to conclude that the painter was directly connected with the Western Church and deeply influenced by it.

In 1940, the church was bombed by the Italian forces, leading to the destruction of the dome.
