= Kasim Baba =

Islamic figure

- Title: Baba

Personal life
- Born: Fifteenth century
- Resting place: Kesriye (modern Kastoria, Greece); or in Kuç or Kapshticë, Albania

Religious life
- Religion: Islam
- Order: Bektashi

Kasim Baba, also Kasem Baba, (Albanian: Qazim Baba, Kasëm Baba; Turkish: Kasım Baba, Greek: Κασίμ Μπαμπά, romanized: Kasím Babá) was a fifteenth century Bektashi religious figure and missionary. In Albania, he is venerated as a Muslim saint.

== Life ==
Kasim Baba was alive during the reign of Ottoman Sultan Mehmed II (1451-1481) and came to the Balkans where he was based in the Kastoria region. A Bektashi based history book written in the early twentieth century places the year of Kasim Baba's arrival to the Balkans at 1378. In his lifetime, he became renown for being a miracle worker. Kasim Baba converted lots of Christians into Muslims through unorthodox methods such as throwing a large rock from a hill toward a church with worshippers below in Kastoria. Legends associated with Kasim Baba is he visited Kuç, gave food to the dervishes at a spot by the cypress trees and later returned to Kastoria, and another of leaving his hand in the city of Elbasan.

== Legacy ==
A turbe (burial moment) and a Bektashi tekke dedicated to Kasim Baba were both located in Kastoria. An Ottoman register recorded the existence of the tekke (late sixteenth century). Ottoman traveller Evliya Çelebi visited Kastoria in 1661 and saw both the turbe and tekke which was located close to the Kastoria lake shore, among "some bushes". Later in the early twentieth century scholar Frederick William Hasluck visited Kastoria and described the tekke as "small, insignificant" staffed by one abbot in 1915 who had left by 1921. The turbe of Kasim Baba was located on a hill above Kastoria, later destroyed. The Bektashi tekke in Kastoria was also destroyed.

One of the earliest (Bektashi) tekke's built in Albania, the tekke of Baba Kasëm in Kuç, Devoll has him as its founder and his real grave is claimed to be based in the village. The Kuç tekke was destroyed (1826) by the Ottomans, rebuilt (1878), expanded (1906-1907), destroyed (1967) by villagers during the Albanian communist anti-religion campaign and rebuilt (1990s) post-communism. Close by in Kapshticë, Devoll, a tomb of Qazim Baba was a place of pilgrimage, with visits being of special significance on Monday and Friday.
