= Kastoria =

City in Macedonia, Greece

Kastoria Καστοριά
- Municipality
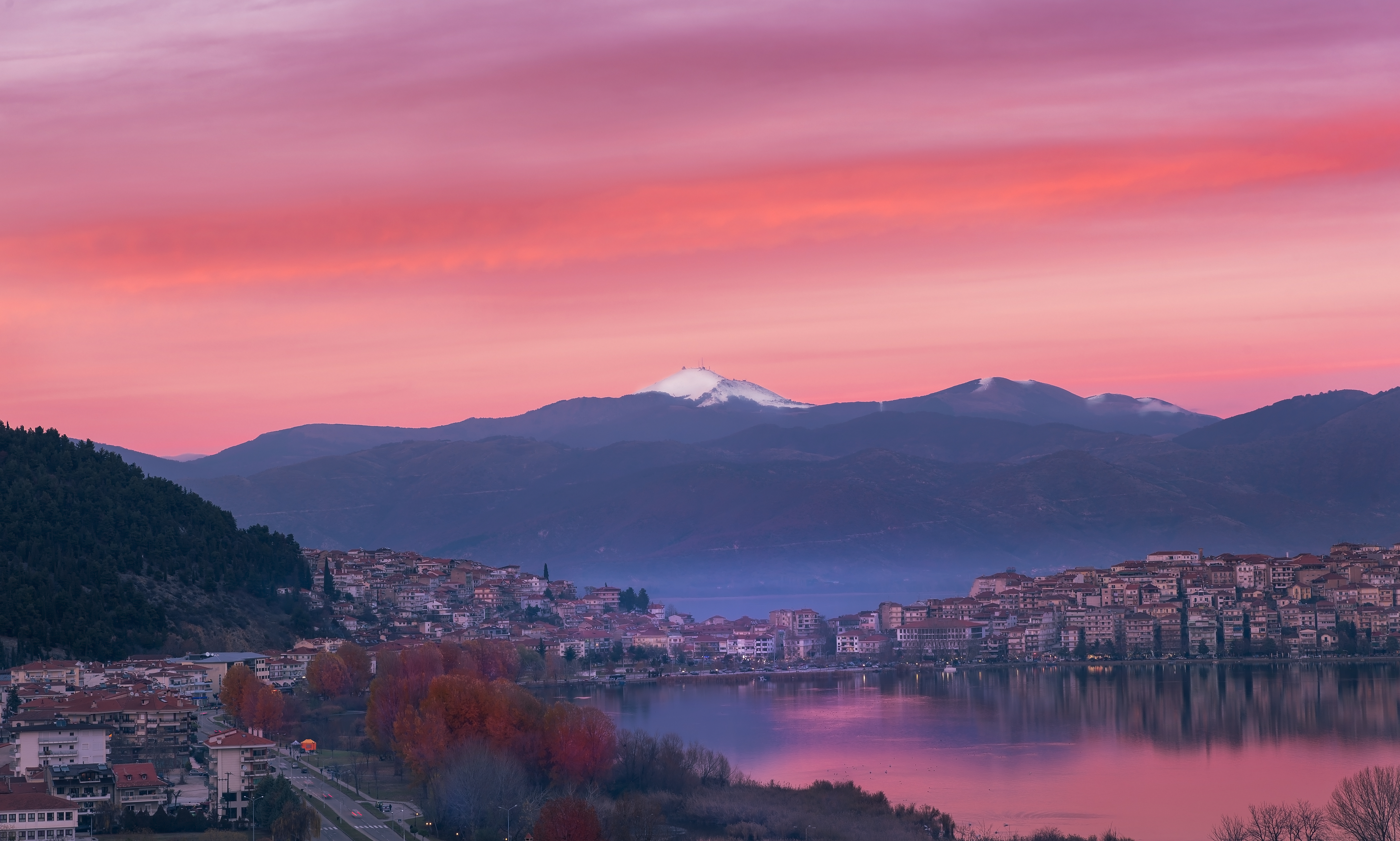
- Kastoria and Lake Orestiada.

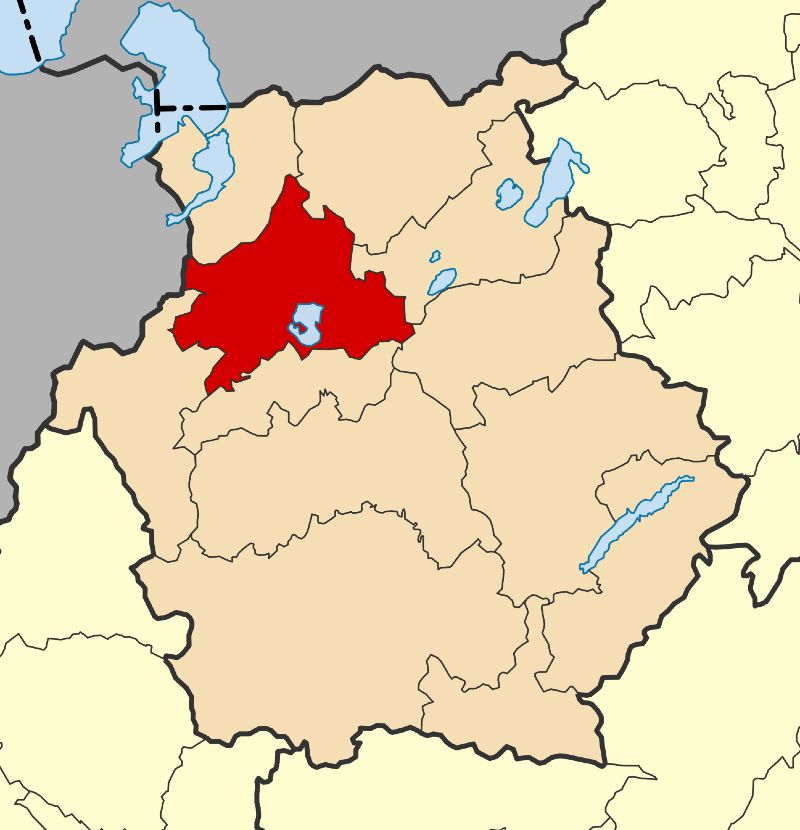

- Location within Greece
- Coordinates: 40°31′N 21°16′E
- Country: Greece
- Geographic region: Macedonia
- Administrative region: Western Macedonia
- Regional unit: Kastoria

Government
  - Mayor: Ioannis Korentsidis (since 2019)

Area
  - Municipality: 763.3 km^{2} (294.7 sq mi)
  - Municipal unit: 57.3 km^{2} (22.1 sq mi)
- Elevation: 700 m (2,300 ft)

Population (2021)
  - Municipality: 33,095
  - Density: 43.36/km^{2} (112.3/sq mi)
  - Municipal unit: 16,393
  - Municipal unit density: 286/km^{2} (741/sq mi)
- Demonym(s): Kastorian; Kastorianos (Greek)
- Time zone: UTC+2 (EET)
  - Summer (DST): UTC+3 (EEST)
- Postal code: 521 00
- Area code: 24670
- Vehicle registration: KT

Kastoria (Greek: Καστοριά, Kastoriá [kastoˈrʝa]) is a city in northern Greece in the region of Western Macedonia. It is the capital of the Kastoria regional unit, in the geographic region of Macedonia. It is situated on a promontory on the western shore of Lake Orestiada, in a valley surrounded by limestone mountains. The city is known for its many Byzantine churches, Byzantine and Ottoman-era domestic architecture, its lake and its fur clothing industry.

== Name ==
In the 6th century, the historian Procopius wrote the name Kastoria was used for the lake. The first reference to the town of Kastoria is by historian John Skylitzes writing about the late 10th century. The toponym Kastoria means "place of beavers" and is derived from kastori (καστόρι), the Greek word for beaver and an animal whose local habitat was along the shores of lake Kastoria. The name of the town is sometimes written as Castoria, especially in older works. The town is known as Kesriye in Turkish, Kostur (Cyrillic: Костур) in Bulgarian and Macedonian, Kosturi in Albanian and Kusturea in Aromanian.

== Municipality ==
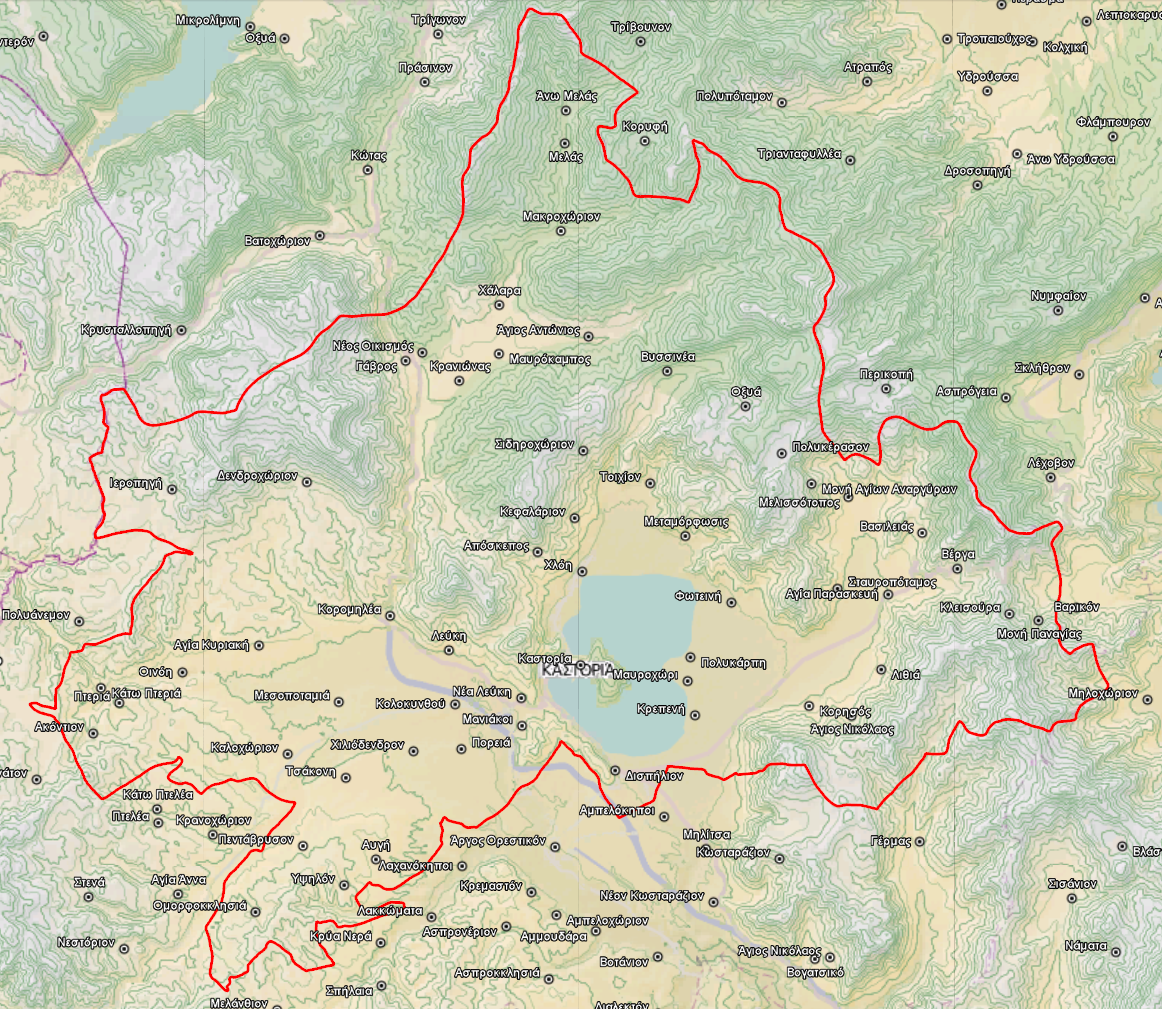
Kastoria municipality map

The municipality Kastoria was formed at the 2011 local government reform by the merger of the following 9 former municipalities, that became municipal units:

- Agia Triada
- Agioi Anargyroi
- Kastoria
- Kastraki
- Kleisoura
- Korestia
- Makednoi
- Mesopotamia
- Vitsi

The municipality has an area of 763.330 km^{2}, the municipal unit 57.318 km^{2}. The municipal unit consists of the town Kastoria and the settlements Aposkepos, Kefalari and Chloi.

=== Districts ===
- Apózari
- Doltsó
- Dailaki (Myloi)
- Doplitsa
- Kato Agora
- Kallithea
- Lyv

== Climate ==
Kastoria has a humid subtropical climate (Cfa). As a result of the moderating effect of the lake, it records less extreme temperatures than the rest of Western Macedonia.

Climate data for Kastoria city (623m)
Month	Jan	Feb	Mar	Apr	May	Jun	Jul	Aug	Sep	Oct	Nov	Dec	Year
Mean daily maximum °C (°F)	7.2 (45.0)	11.8 (53.2)	14.7 (58.5)	17.3 (63.1)	23.3 (73.9)	27.8 (82.0)	30.4 (86.7)	31.3 (88.3)	26.4 (79.5)	19.6 (67.3)	13.9 (57.0)	9.2 (48.6)	19.4 (66.9)
Mean daily minimum °C (°F)	−1.1 (30.0)	0.8 (33.4)	3 (37)	6 (43)	10.2 (50.4)	14.3 (57.7)	16.9 (62.4)	16.9 (62.4)	13.5 (56.3)	8.6 (47.5)	5.8 (42.4)	2.8 (37.0)	8.1 (46.6)
Average precipitation mm (inches)	50 (2.0)	54 (2.1)	61 (2.4)	79 (3.1)	81 (3.2)	48 (1.9)	40 (1.6)	31 (1.2)	46 (1.8)	66 (2.6)	65 (2.6)	40.5 (1.59)	661.5 (26.09)
Source: 2019–2021 averages and precipitation

== History ==
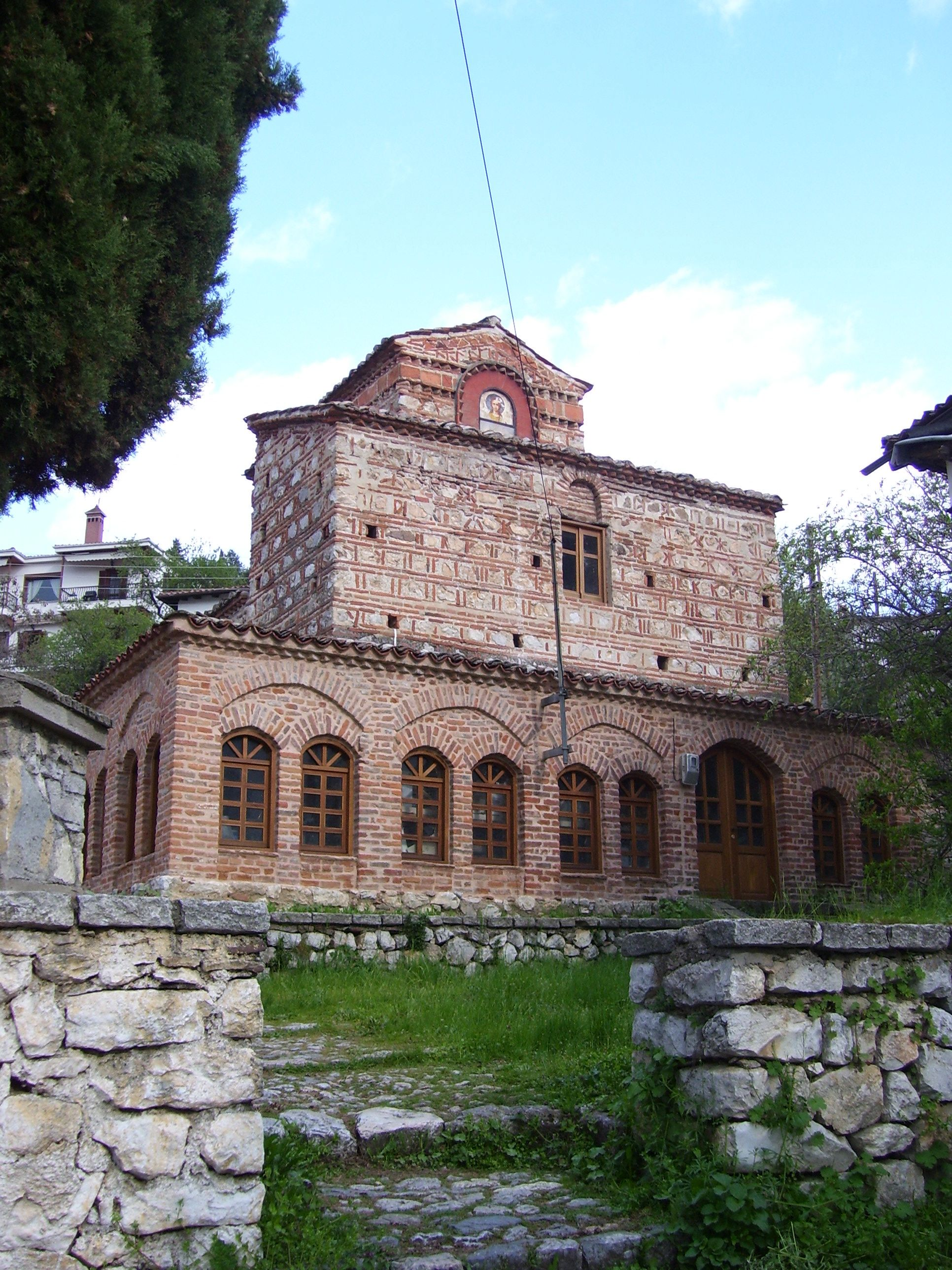
The church of St. Stephanos (10th c.), Paleologou Street

=== Antiquity ===
Kastoria was the site of previous settlements, the first being Celetrum (or Keletron), a town located near a lake in Orestis and mentioned by historian Livy in reference to the events of 199 BC. Celetrum surrendered to Publius Sulpicius Galba during the Roman war (200–197 BC) against Philip V of Macedon. The ancient town was possibly located on a hill above the town's current location.

The Roman Emperor Diocletian (ruled 284–305 AD) founded the town of Diocletianopolis (Διοκλητιανούπολις) in the vicinity. After Diocletianopolis was destroyed by barbarians, Emperor Justinian relocated it on a promontory projecting into Lake Orestiada, the town's current location, and Procopius writes the emperor "gave it an appropriate name", perhaps indicating that he renamed it Justinianopolis (Ίουστινιανούπολις). References to Justinian's settlement cease during the 7th and 8th centuries, due to the possible abandonment of the location. Emperor Constantine Porphyrogenitus made an anachronistic mention of Diocletianopolis in his work De Thematibus (10th century).

=== Middle Ages ===
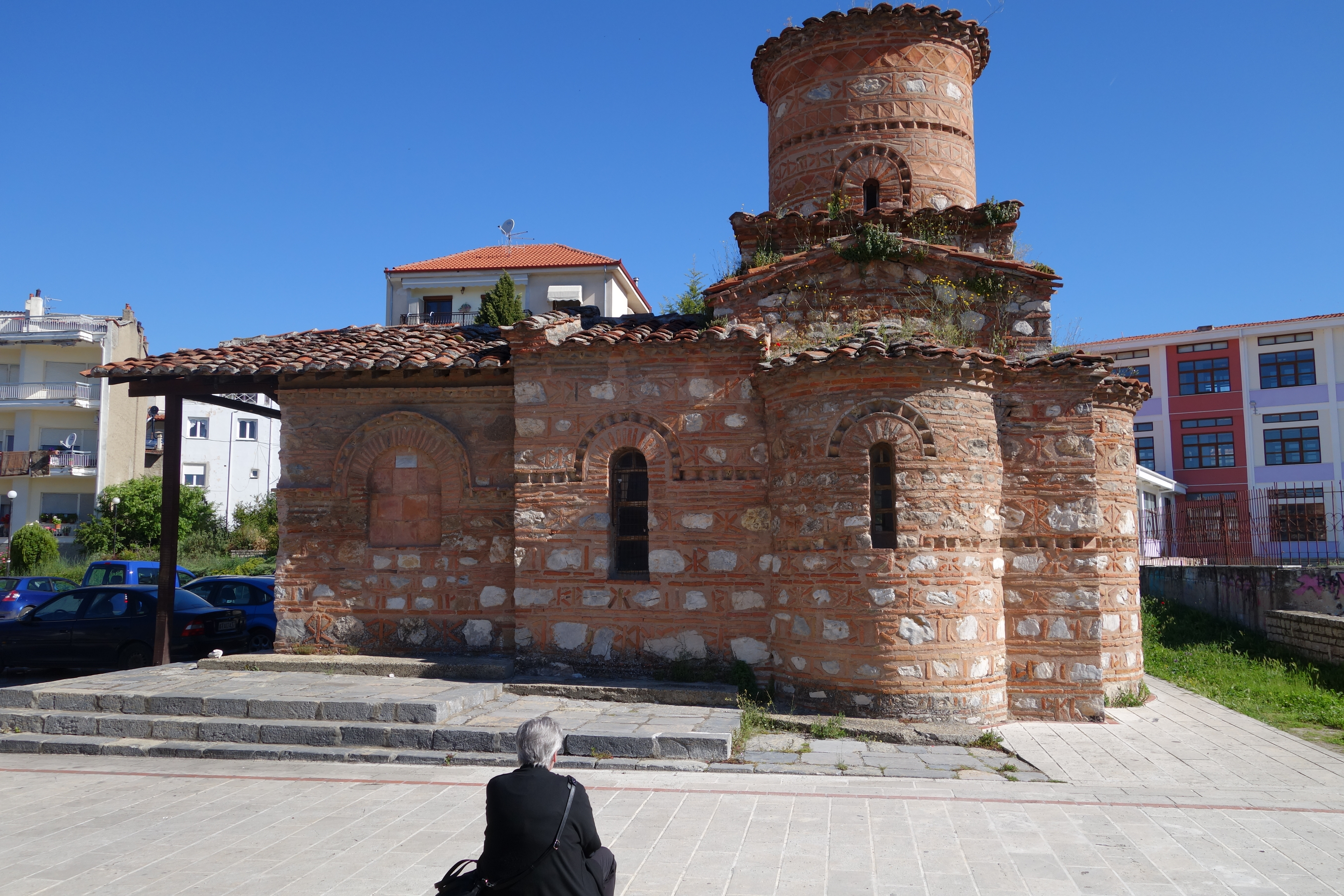
The church of Panagia (Koumpelidiki) (9th or 10th c.).

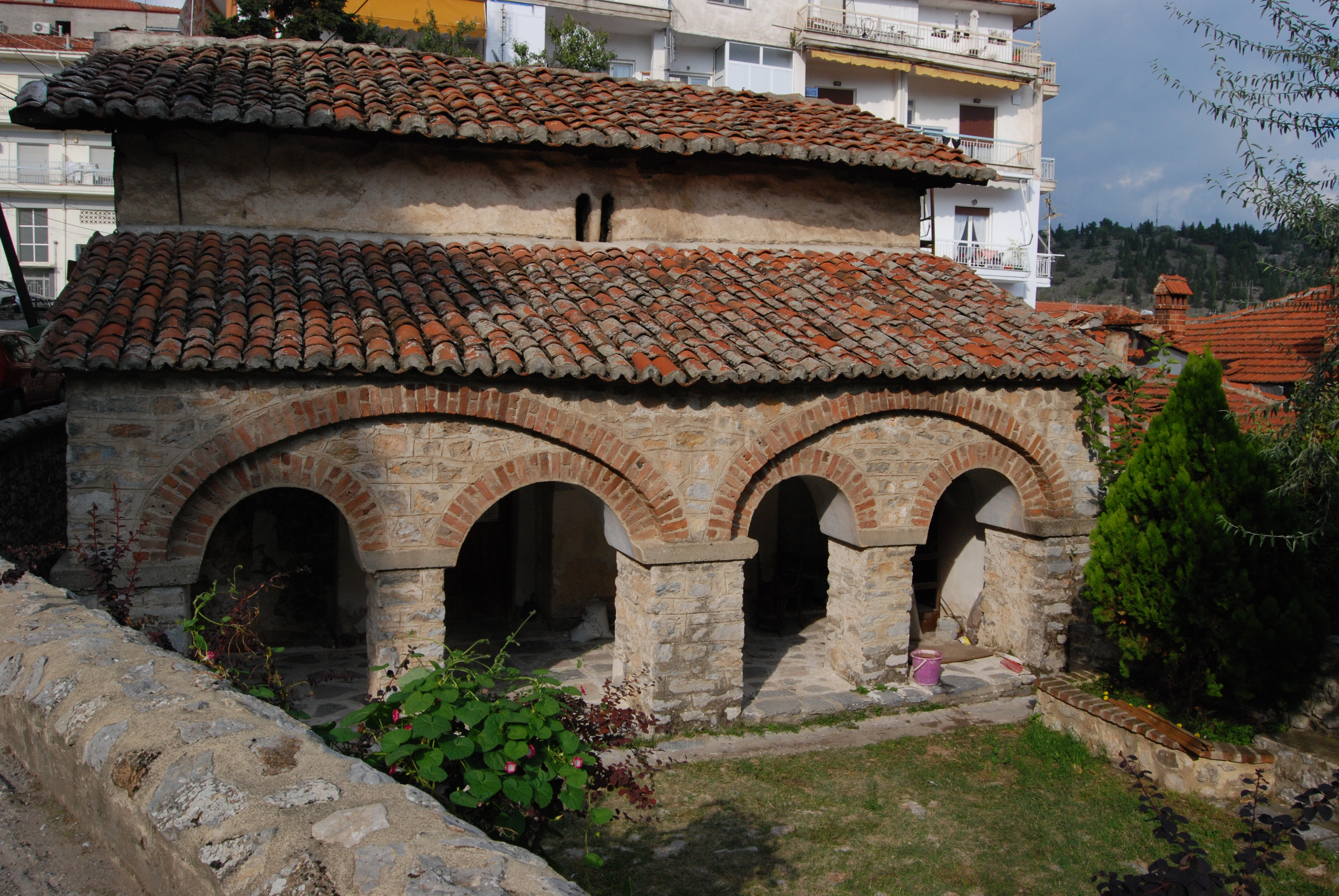
The church of Three Saints (15th c.).

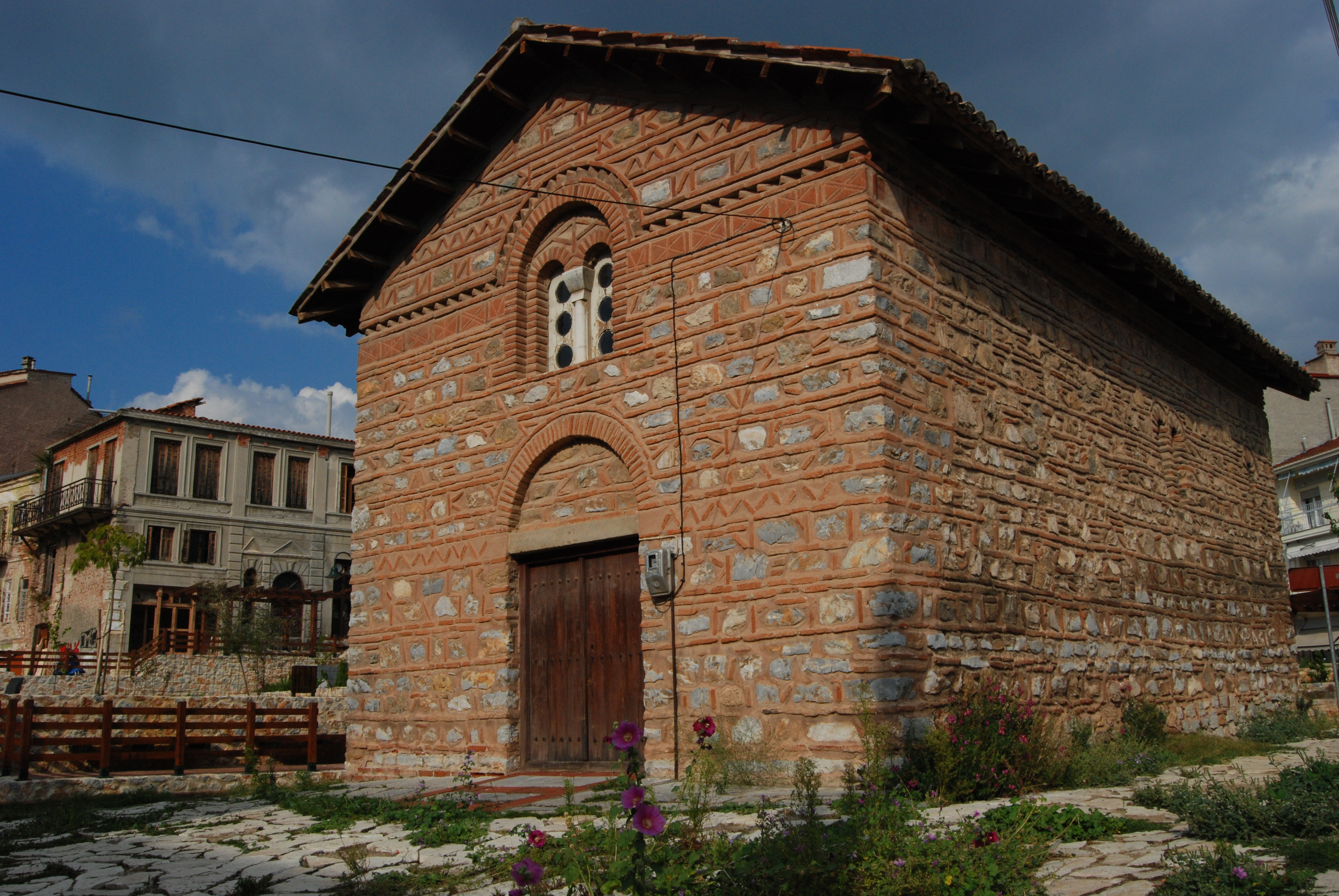
The church of St Nicholas Kasnitzes (12th c.).

The origins of Kastoria are from the 9th century, as its surrounding walls and oldest churches, such as St. Stephan and the Taxiarchs, date from the era. The first mention of the settlement of Kastoria was by Skylitzes in relation to events of the late 10th century during the Byzantine–Bulgarian wars. The town was in Bulgarian hands until 1018, when it was conquered by Basil II.

Kastoria was occupied by the Normans under Bohemond I in 1082/83. In October 1083, emperor Alexios I Komnenos forced the garrison to surrender, recovering thus the town and convincing many Norman troops, including Peter Aliphas, to enter his services.

During the 13th and 14th centuries, the town became contested between several powers and changed hands often. The Second Bulgarian Empire held the city under Kaloyan and Ivan Asen II. Under the Bulgarians, Kastoria had a significant Romaniote Jewish community, with prominent individuals such as scholar Tobiah ben Eliezer.

Later, it was recovered by the Despotate of Epirus. The Nicaean Empire captured it in ca. 1252, but lost it again to Epirus in ca. 1257, only for the Nicaeans to recapture it following the Battle of Pelagonia (1259).

In the early 14th century, Kastoria was part of the domain of John II Doukas, "doux of Great Vlachia and Kastoria". After his death, the town became part of the semi-autonomous domain of Stephen Gabrielopoulos. After the latter's death in 1332/3, the Byzantine emperor Andronikos III Palaiologos took over the town, but in the very next year (1334) it was surrendered briefly to the Serbs by the renegade Syrgiannes Palaiologos.

The Serbian ruler Stephen Dushan finally captured Kastoria in 1342/3, taking advantage of the ongoing Byzantine civil war, and made it part of his Serbian Empire. After Dushan's death, Kastoria became the seat of Symeon Uroš.

The town came later under the Epirote ruler Thomas Preljubović, and then under the Albanian Muzaka family, until it was conquered by the Ottoman Empire in the mid-1380s.

=== Ottoman era ===
The Ottoman Turks conquered Kastoria around 1385, but it is unclear whether by force or by an agreement with its Albanian rulers. Following the conquest and depopulation of Constantinople, the Romaniote Jews from Kastoria were forcefully resettled by the Ottomans in Balat district as part of efforts to repopulate the city. Toward the end of the 15th century, Jews expelled from Italy, Sicily, Portugal and Spain settled in Kastoria. In 1519, Kastoria was a zeamet of Chamberlain Mehmed Bey, and the infantry commander of Thessaloniki, Hızır. The town also had Voynuks.

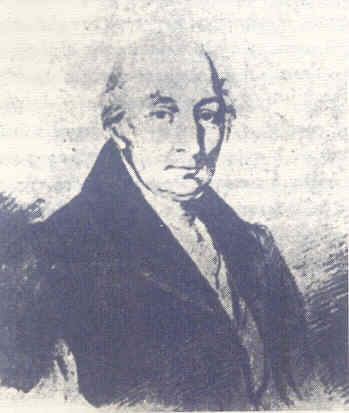
The Kastorian native Georgios Theocharis was a co-conspirator of Rigas Feraios and later consul of Greece in Leipzig.

The establishment of Ottoman rule resulted in the demise of the local Greek landowning class, and funding of the arts and culture in Kastoria was undertaken by its wealthy merchants. The Greek merchants Georgios Kyritses and Manolakis Kastorianos financed Greek education in Kastoria. Greek schools were established in Kastoria, with the oldest in the town and Macedonia being founded in 1614; a second was founded in 1705, and a third in 1715, funded by Kyritses.

In 1797–1798, the Greek revolutionary Rigas Feraios was partly based in Kastoria. Among his co-conspirators were several Kastorian Greeks, such as Georgios Theocharis, and the brothers Panagiotis and John Emmanuel. When they were arrested by the Austrian authorities and handed over to the Ottomans, John Emmanuel admitted that he had smuggled a copy of Feraios' revolutionary song "Thourios" (Greek: Θούριος) into Kastoria and sang it there many times. Theocharis escaped execution thanks to his Austrian citizenship, but those of Feraios' companions that did not possess foreign citizenship were executed. When the Greek War of Independence broke out in 1821, there was Greek revolutionary activity in Kastoria as throughout the towns and villages of western Macedonia. John Papareskas was a notable Greek revolutionary from Kastoria. Revolutionary activity attracted the attention of the Ottoman authorities and the Ottoman commander Mehmet Emin took several Greek notables as hostages from towns in western Macedonia, including Kastoria.

Following the destruction of Moscopole (late eighteenth century), some Aromanian refugees attempted to settle in Kastoria, and their efforts were unsuccessful due to concerns by local Kastorians over economic competition from newcomers. Later, Aromanians with origins from Moscopole, Nikolicë, Vithkuq and other locations settled in Kastoria, and by the mid–nineteenth century the upper class of the town's Greek community was formed mostly by Aromanian families.

In the late Ottoman period, Kastoria was the seat of a kaza belonging to the sanjak of Görice, within the Vilayet of Monastir.

The older presence of Greek cultural tradition led to the establishment of strong Greek national feeling among town inhabitants in an era of conflict arising from nationalism (late 19th and early 20th centuries). As a result, Kastoria became the main location for the Greek movement in west Macedonia during this period.

=== Macedonian Struggle and Balkan Wars ===
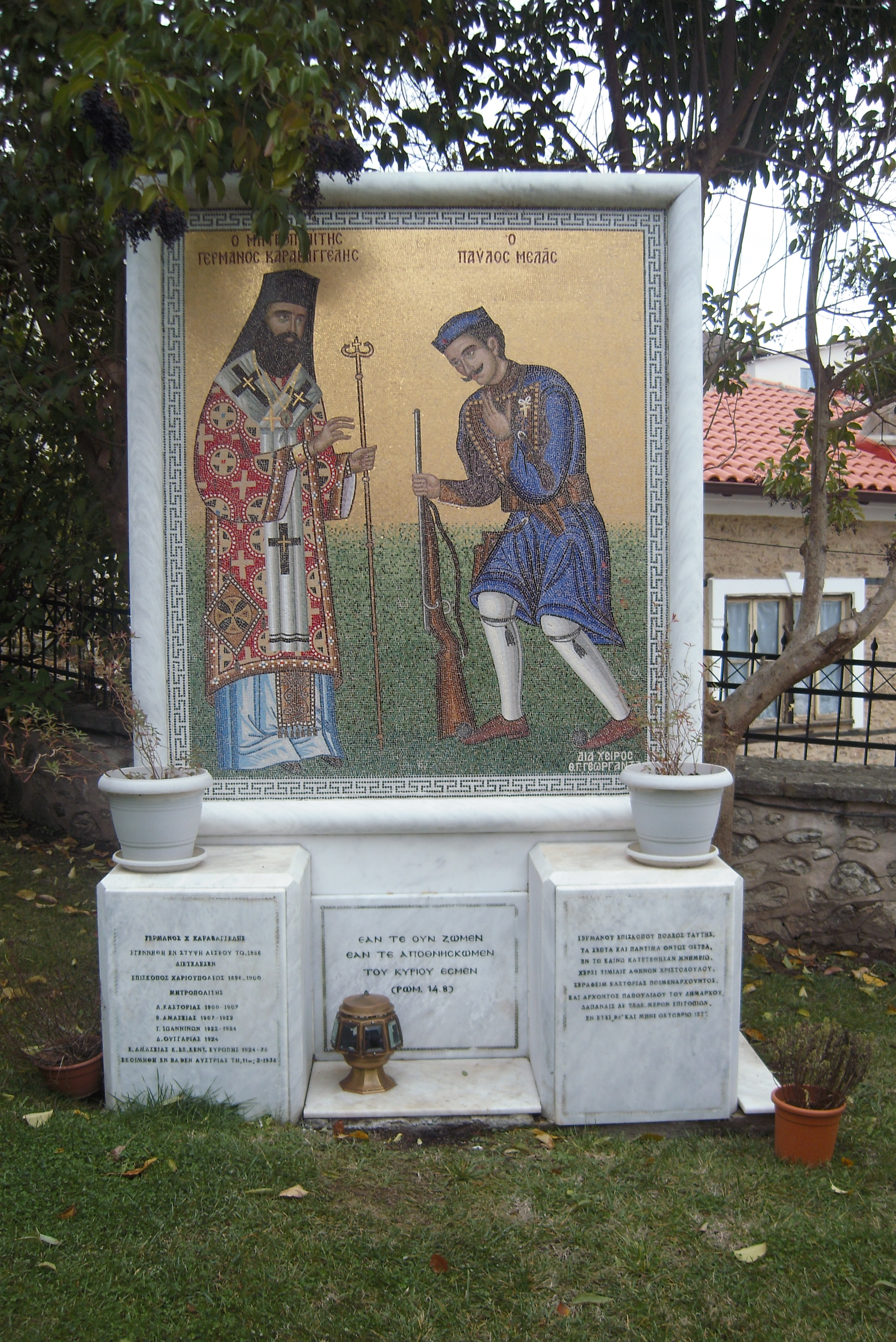
A memorial in Kastoria depicting Germanos Karavangelis (left) and Pavlos Melas (right).

As a largely Greek town in west Macedonia at the turn of the 20th century, Kastoria featured prominently in the Greek efforts during the Macedonian Struggle. A notable figure was Germanos Karavangelis, who served as the Greek Orthodox Metropolitan Bishop of Kastoria from 1900 until 1907. Karavangelis thought that the post-Ottoman future of Macedonia would be decided by Balkan states, and viewed Bulgarian influence in the area as the greatest threat to Greek interests. He formed the earliest Greek armed groups fighting for the region. During the Macedonian struggle, Karavangelis, an imposing figure, traveled in rural areas and directed the Greek response toward supporters of the Bulgarian cause, the Internal Macedonian Revolutionary Organization (VMRO) and the Exarchate. He supported close interaction among local Turks and Greeks, but only when it was needed. Greece sent more funds, men and arms to individuals such as Karavangelis in Macedonia. When the Greek fighter and officer Pavlos Melas was killed in action in 1904, Karavangelis arranged to have his body buried within the Metropolis of Kastoria, after first having threatened to mobilize the town's Greek population if the Ottoman authorities did not surrender Melas' body.

=== Modern Greece ===
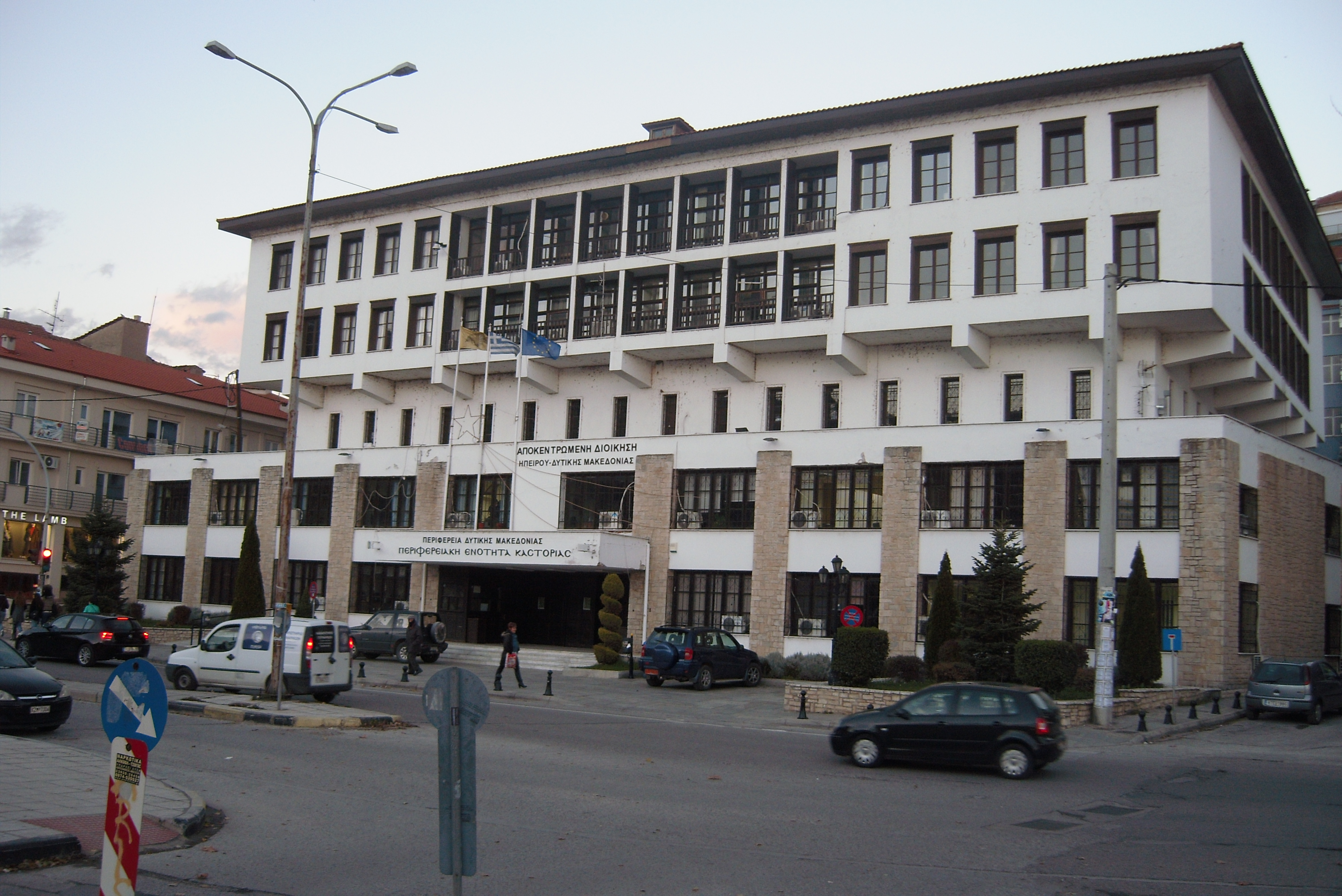
Regional unit building

Ottoman rule ended in Kastoria after it was taken by the Greek Army in the First Balkan War (1912). In 1913, the town was annexed and the treaties of London and Bucharest formally recognised Kastoria and the wider area as part of Greece.

=== World War II ===
During both World War II and the Greek Civil War, the town was repeatedly fought over and heavily damaged in the process. It was nearly captured by the Communist Democratic Army of Greece in 1948, and the final battles of the civil war took place on the nearby Mount Gramos in 1949.

In 1940, Kastoria came under Italian occupation. In 1943, the judicial courts of Kastoria were destroyed by fire, including the town archive. Italy surrendered in late 1943, and Kastoria came under German control. In April 1944 the German army sent the town's Jews first to Thessaloniki and later to the Auschwitz concentration camp where they were gassed. In 1945, the Kastoria Jewish community numbered 35 people, a reduction of 95 percent due to the Holocaust.

Kastoria was liberated from German rule by the guerrillas of the Greek People's Liberation Army.

=== Contemporary period ===
Following the Greek Civil War, large numbers of Kastorian Greeks migrated abroad, where in the 1980s they numbered 25,000 in the New York area, and worked as furriers; younger generations worked as lawyers and doctors. A Kastorian Greek diaspora numbering 10,000 in the 1980s established itself in Frankfurt after it replaced Leipzig as Germany's new fur industry centre, following its post–war division. Nowadays Kastoria is a prosperous provincial town, its economy being mainly driven by the fur industry and tourism, the latter due to the town's physical attractiveness and many historical Byzantine churches.

== Economy ==
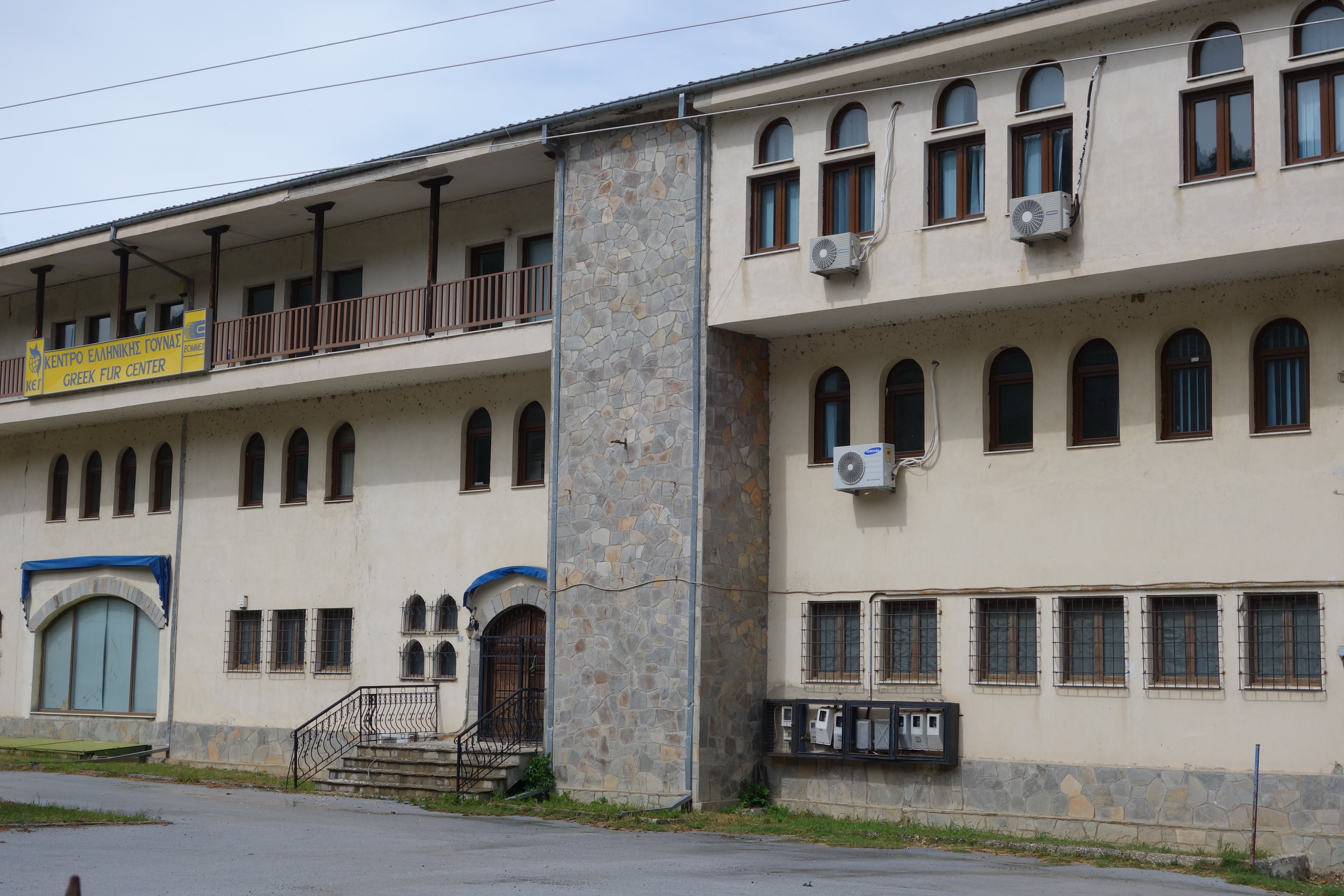
Hellenic fur center

Kastoria is a popular tourist destination and an international centre of fur trade, having taken so the nickname the city of the fur traders. Tourism and the fur industry dominate the local economy. Indeed, (as mentioned above) the town was possibly named after one of the former staples of the trade – the European beaver (kastóri in Greek), now extinct in the area. Mink fur trading now predominates, with an international fur showcase held annually in the city.

Involvement with fur began in the early middle ages, when Kastoria supplied ermine pelts for the robes of Byzantine courtiers. The fur industry was established in Kastoria during the sixteenth century, and extensive trade links emerged connecting the town with wider Europe. Merchants settled in Germany and Russia. In the seventeenth century, Kastoria was the European fur industry centre and marketplace, and various fur products on offer were imports (such as pelts from Russian sable), with a majority of Kastorian Jews being wealthy dealers in the fur trade. By the late 18th century, Kastoria had developed a strong Hellenic commercial culture.

In Kastoria, Jews participated in trade and tanning production. The Jewish community was involved in the fur industry, and its merchants worked closely with craftsmen who were mainly from the Greek community. The town economy was successful, in particular during the nineteenth century, due to both Jews and Greeks working well together. Slavophone peasants from the wider area would go to Kastoria on market days. By the early twentieth century, Jewish merchants were involved in the trade of fur and tobacco. The Muslim population of Kastoria in 1913 worked as fishermen (30 percent) in Lake Kastoria, in agriculture (13 percent), or were large landowners (16 percent). In the interwar period, local Jews were involved in the textile, agricultural, and raw material sectors of Kastoria's economy.

In modern Kastoria, there are more than 300 small and big dealers in fur. Abroad, early twentieth century immigration to New York from Kastoria by Greeks involved in fur production expanded the local US industry, as demand for fur clothing increased, with most small businesses owned by Kastorian Greeks. The modern fur industry in New York is run by Kastorian Greeks, such as Castor Furs; a business involved in the fashion industry. Other industries include the sale and distribution of locally grown produce; particularly wheat, apples, wine, and fish. Recently a large shopping center has been built in the city of Kastoria. Kastoria has 16 local radio stations, two TV stations, five daily newspapers, and seven weekly ones. The town's airport is named Aristotelis Airport.

== Population ==
Year	Town	Municipal unit	Municipality
1981	20,660	–	–
1991	14,775	–	–
2001	14,813	16,218	–
2011	13,387	16,958	35,874
2021	12,548	16,393	33,095

=== Historical ===
The Ottoman fiscal register of 1445 showed a total population of 4,518, of which 3,977 were Christians, 431 were Jews, and 110 were Muslims.

In 1519, the town had 4,815 people, of which 4,480 were Christians and 335 were Muslims, divided into 732 Christian households and 67 Muslim households. Muslims were a minority in Kastoria, and would remain a minority for the duration of Ottoman rule.

According to the findings of Vasil Kanchov, at the turn of the 20th century, the town had 3,000 Greek Christians, 1,600 Turkish Muslims, 750 Jews, 300 Bulgarian Christians, 300 Albanian Christians, and 240 Roma, for a total of 6,190 inhabitants. According to the findings of Dimitri Mishev, the town had a population of 4,000 Greek Christians, 400 Bulgarian Patriarchist Grecomans and 72 Vlachs in 1905 (excluding the Muslim minority).

The 1920 Greek census recorded 6,280 people in the town, and 829 inhabitants (242 families) were Muslim in 1923. The Muslim minority of Kastoria was sent to Turkey during the Greek–Turkish population exchange (1923), and resettled in places such as Bor, Kahramanmaraş, and Yozgat in Turkey. Following the exchange, there were 101 Greek refugee families from Asia Minor, 19 from East Thrace, and one from Pontus in 1926. The 1928 Greek census recorded 10,308 inhabitants. In 1928, Greek refugee families numbered 137 (588 people).

=== Jewish Community ===
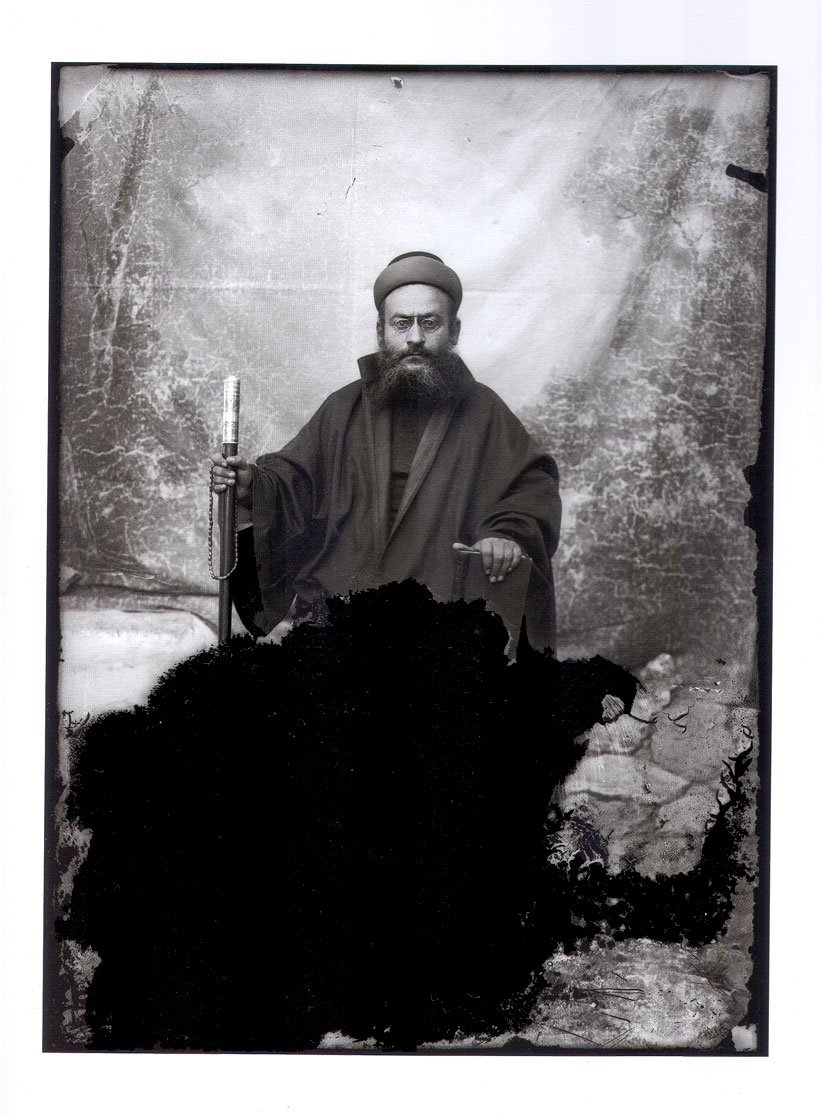
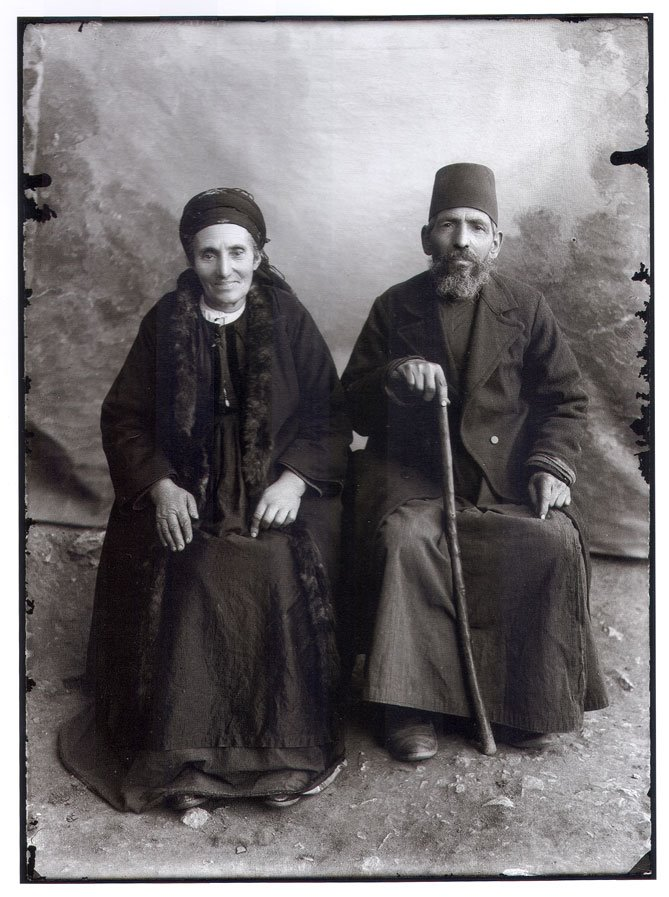
Kastorian Jewish rabbi and Jewish couple (early 20th cent.)

A Jewish presence in the area is recorded as early as late antiquity, when a Jewish community resided in Emperor Justinian's settlement. At the time of the First Bulgarian Empire, Kastoria had a significant Romaniote Jewish community, with prominent individuals such as scholar Tobiah ben Eliezer.

Following the conquest and depopulation of Constantinople, the Romaniote Jews from Kastoria led by Matthias Tamar, were forcefully resettled by the Ottomans in Balat district as part of efforts to repopulate the city. A synagogue named after Kastoria was built and still stands in modern Istanbul. Toward the end of the 15th century, Jews expelled from Italy, Sicily, Portugal and Spain settled in Kastoria and became an important part of the population.

In the late seventeenth century, the Jewish messianic Sabbatean movement had some prominent supporters in Kastoria, although most remained as practicing Jews. An epidemic during 1719–1720 resulted in 62 deaths among the Jewish community. Jews with Italian and Spanish origins from Vlorë, later went to Berat, and by 1740 had resettled in Kastoria due to several epidemics.

Several blood libels were made toward the Jewish community during the 19th century. In 1873, a Jewish school was founded in the town. Bandits took 70 Jews hostage in 1887, and their release was secured by the Jewish community. Some Kastorian Jews migrated to Salonika. Ladino-speaking Jews immigrated to the United States, and by the early twentieth century those from Kastoria had formed a Kastoria Society. In the modern period, the community still uses the name Kastoria for burial plots. Under Ottoman rule, the Jews of Kastoria had close ties with the Jewish community of Monastir (modern Bitola). The levels of Jewish education increased in Kastoria after the organisation Alliance Israélite Universelle provided funding and support in 1903. In the early twentieth century, the Kastorian Jews were Sephardim and numbered some 1,600. In Kastoria, the Jewish community had a chief rabbi, three yeshivot (Jewish religious schools), and several synagogues. In 1906 the Jewish population numbered 1,600, and in 1908 a blood libel occurred.

Throughout the 1920s, the Jewish community had two synagogues, two welfare organisations, a society for burials, a kindergarten and school. In 1928, Kastorian Jews numbered 1,000. In 1928, a Zionist association was formed in Kastoria, and some of the town's Jewish children were sent to study and live in Mandate Palestine.

In World War Two, Kastoria and its Jewish population came under Italian, and later, German occupation. The Jewish community numbered 900 people in 1940 and 1943. Some Jews became partisans, and others fled to a nearby village. In late March 1944, 763 Kastorian Jews residing in the Jewish neighbourhood were taken prisoner, while 50 went into hiding, and the Greek Orthodox Archbishop secured the release of 30–40 Jews. During April 1944, the German army sent the town's Jews first to Thessaloniki, and later to the Auschwitz concentration camp where they were gassed. In 1945, the Kastoria Jewish community numbered 35 people; a reduction of 95 percent due to the Holocaust.

The Jewish population of Kastoria was 38 in 1948, 27 in 1959, two in 1973, and five in 1983. Post war, heirless Jewish properties of Kastoria were 22 dwellings, three shops, and 35 land lots, and were administered by the OPAIE (The Heirless Property and Jewish Rehabilitation Fund). In the early 1970s, the Central Board of Jewish Communities, an organisation representing Jewish communities in Greece, attempted to liquidate Jewish properties in Kastoria with support from a few local Jews, several other Kastorians, and officials. The Kastoria Jewish diaspora in Israel and the US supported moves to reclaim the properties. The Central Board managed to gain control of a few communal properties after purchasing them from their Jewish owners. The Jewish community had dwindled to one family. During the 1980s, relatives and business were factors which influenced Jews to remain in Kastoria. By the late twentieth century the Jewish presence in Kastoria had disappeared due to deaths and migration. Members from the Kastorian Jewish diaspora produced Trezoros: The Lost Jews of Kastoria, a documentary about the Jews of Kastoria.

== Landmarks ==
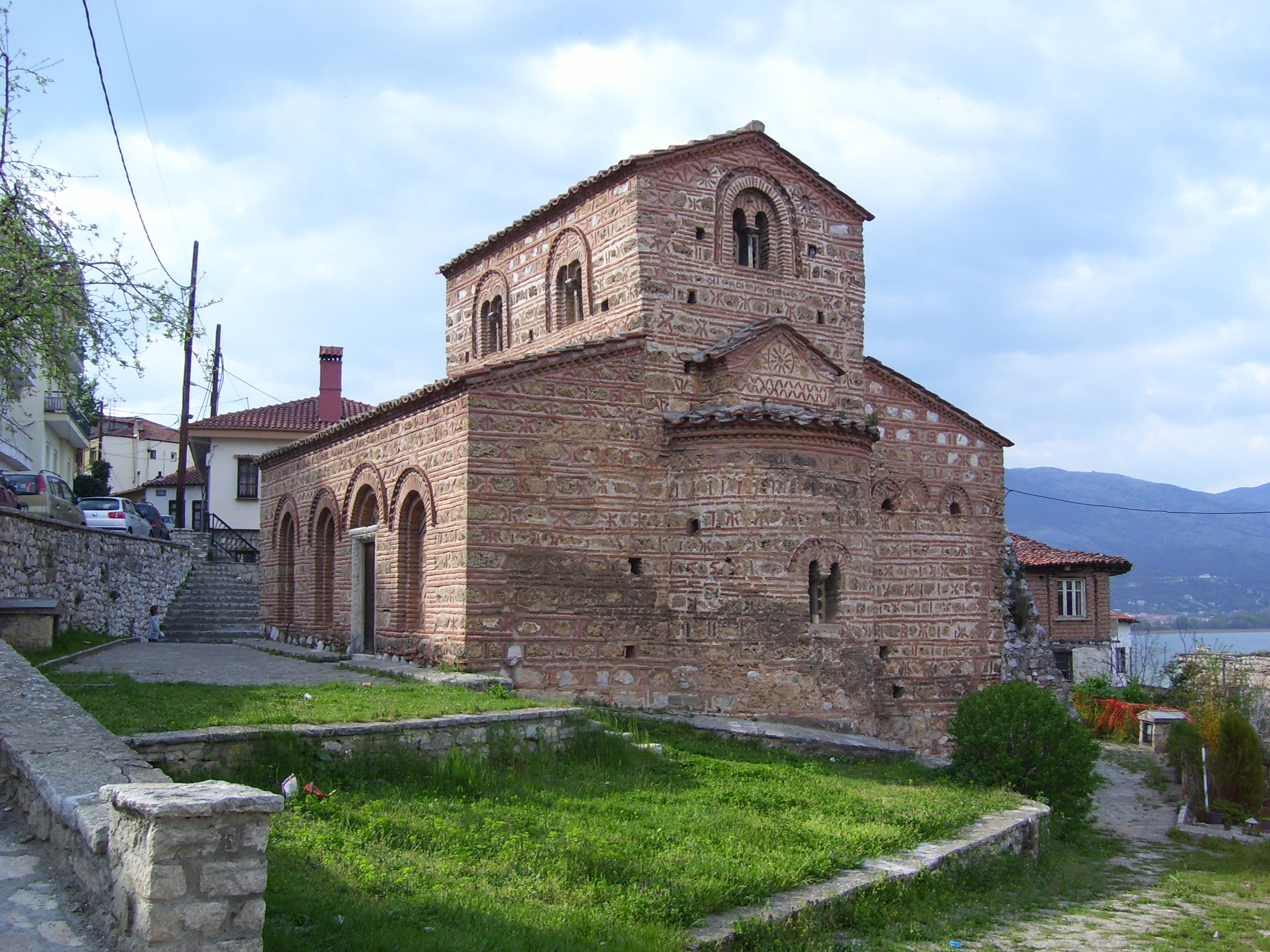
Sts Cosmas and Damian (Anargiroi) church, of 11th century, beside the lake

=== Byzantine monuments ===
Kastoria is an important religious centre for the Greek Orthodox Church, and is the seat of a metropolitan bishop. The Metropolis of Kastoria is one of the metropolises of the New Lands in Greece, administered as part of the Church of Greece. Kastoria originally had 72 Byzantine and medieval churches, of which 54 have survived; including Panagia Koumpelidiki and St Athanasius of Mouzaki. Some of these have been restored and provide useful insight into trends in Late Byzantine styles of architecture and fresco painting.

The Museum of Byzantine History located on Dexamenis Square houses many examples of Byzantine iconography. The Costume Museum and the Monuments Museum are also located in the city.

=== Doltsó and Apózari ===
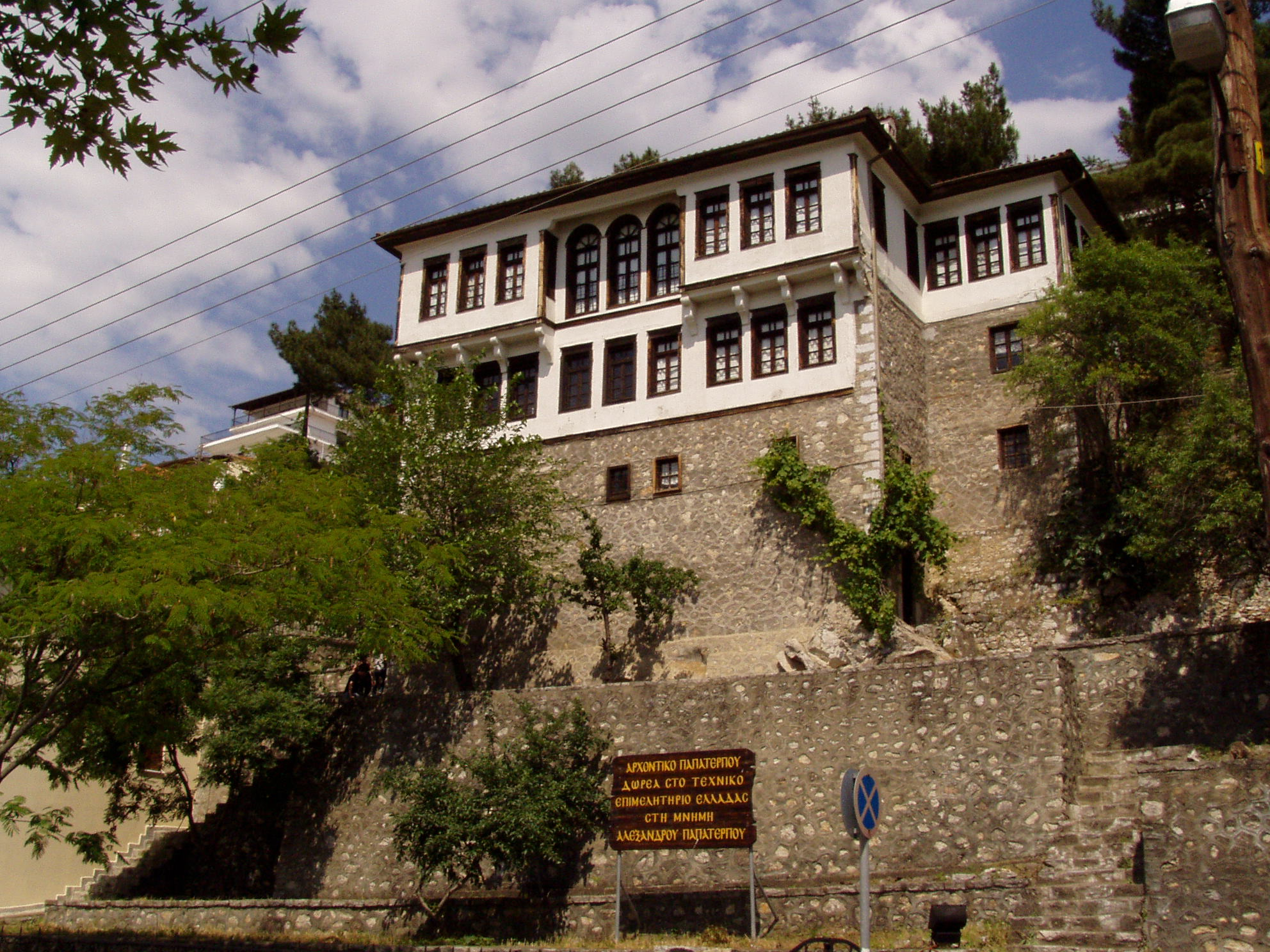
Papapetros mansion

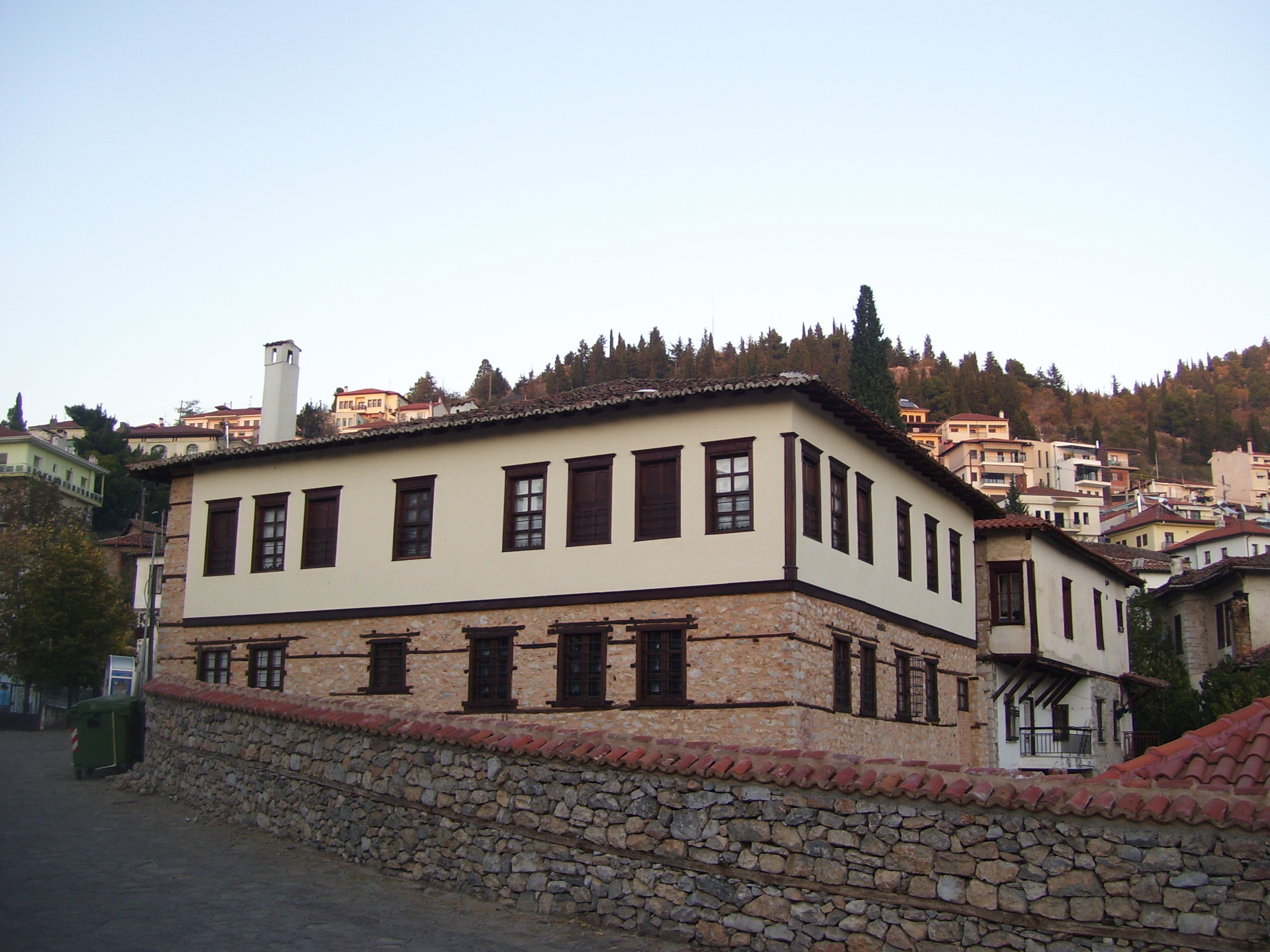
The mansion of Anastasios Picheon, now Macedonian struggle museum, Doltso Square

During the Ottoman times, Kastoria attracted a multitude of people from across the Balkans and beyond, resulting in a diverse, multi-ethnic community. As a result, the city plan was radically transformed. The different ethnic communities, Bulgarian, Turkish, Greek, and Jewish, became centred around separate neighbourhoods or 'quarters'. Two old Greek lakeside quarters, the "Doltso" (Dolcho) and "Apozari" neighbourhoods, are among the best-preserved and last remaining traditional quarters of the city.

These neighbourhoods are characterised by the rich stock of old houses preserved in the shape of autonomous historic buildings, such as the important private mansions or the more humble folk dwellings ('accessory' buildings) built between the 17th and 19th centuries. During this time, the processing and exporting of animal furs to Europe created wealth, and city mansions, of particular architectural and decorative value, were built. This interconnected nexus of churches and private houses constitutes a rare example of a Byzantine and post-Byzantine township, and remains inhabited to this day.

The traditional buildings and manor houses of the "Doltso" and "Apozari" neighbourhoods are threatened by modern development in the city, as well as structural degradation from poor levels of conservation. These sites were included on the 7 Most Endangered list of Europe's most at-risk monuments and sites in 2014.

=== Jewish Monuments ===
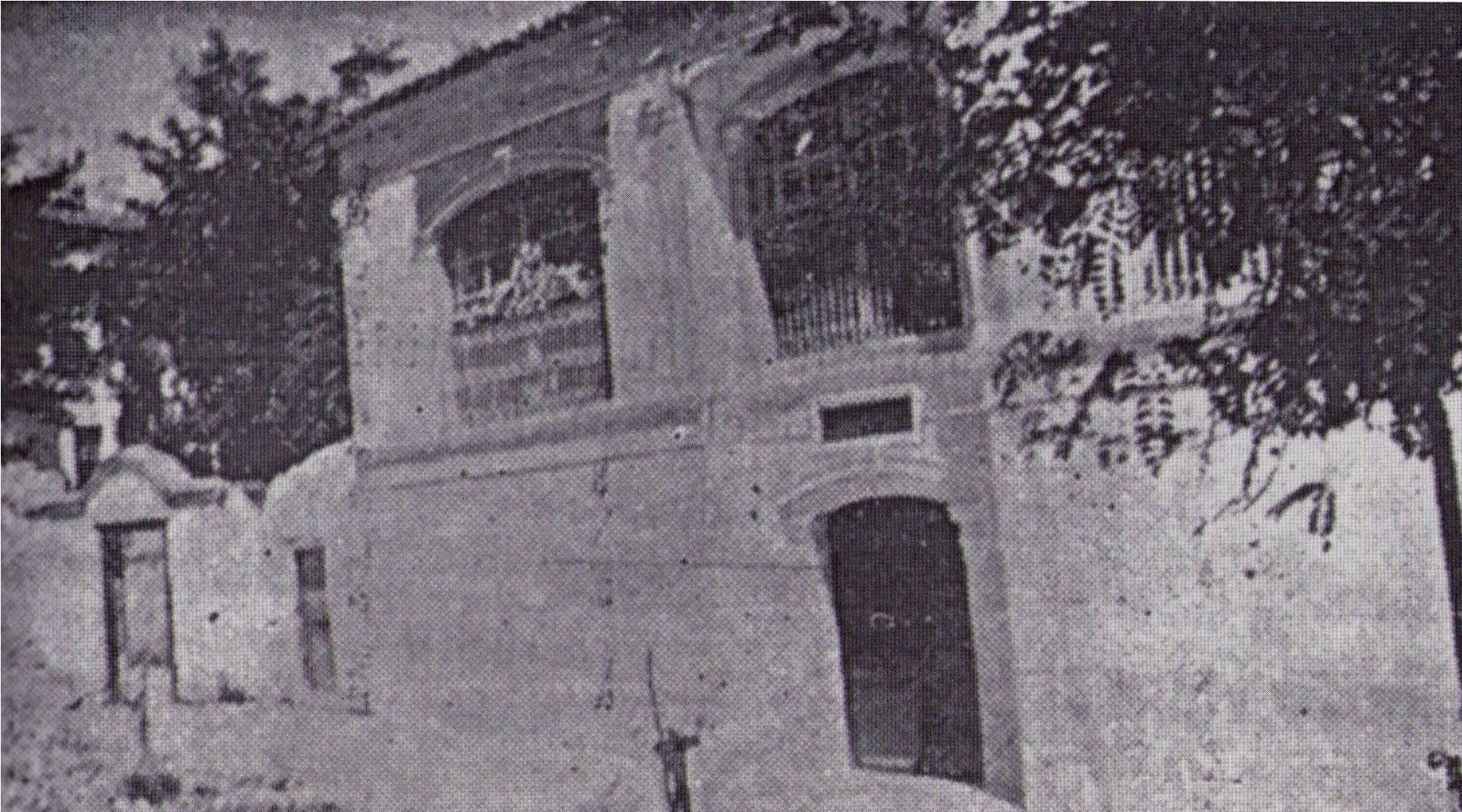
Aragon Synagogue in Kastoria

During the late fifteenth century, a synagogue in Kastoria was built and was one of several in the region with the name Aragon. Kastoria had four synagogues (Italian, Portuguese, Romaniot and Spanish) in the early 18th century. Fire destroyed three synagogues between 1719 and 1720. A synagogue was constructed in 1750, and destroyed during 1828. In 1830, another synagogue named Aragon was erected by the Jewish community. Following World War Two, the Aragon synagogue was sold by the Central Board of Jewish Communities, and the new owners demolished it. The Jewish cemetery of Kastoria was neglected from the late interwar period, and had by the 1970s become overgrown with vegetation. The Greek army expropriated the cemetery in the next decade and turned the site into military barracks. Several stones were preserved. Some tombstones were repurposed for the storage room floor, and most stones were reused to construct the pathways of the site and barracks.

=== Ottoman monuments ===
During the Ottoman era, a Muslim minority resided in Kastoria and constructed various public, private and religious buildings. Kastoria had seven mosques in the late Ottoman period. Several mosques were constructed on sites or used, as had been Muslim practice, earlier Christian churches. Gazi Ervenos Mosque or Gula Mosque was the earliest built in the town after the Ottoman conquest. After 1912, Greek troops in Kastoria demolished the minaret and in 1926 the remaining mosque was demolished and replaced with a reservoir. Kule Mosque or Mosque of Dioikitiriou was repurposed following the population exchange into a grain warehouse, later a notary office. In 1950, Kastoria Municipality expropriated and demolished the building.

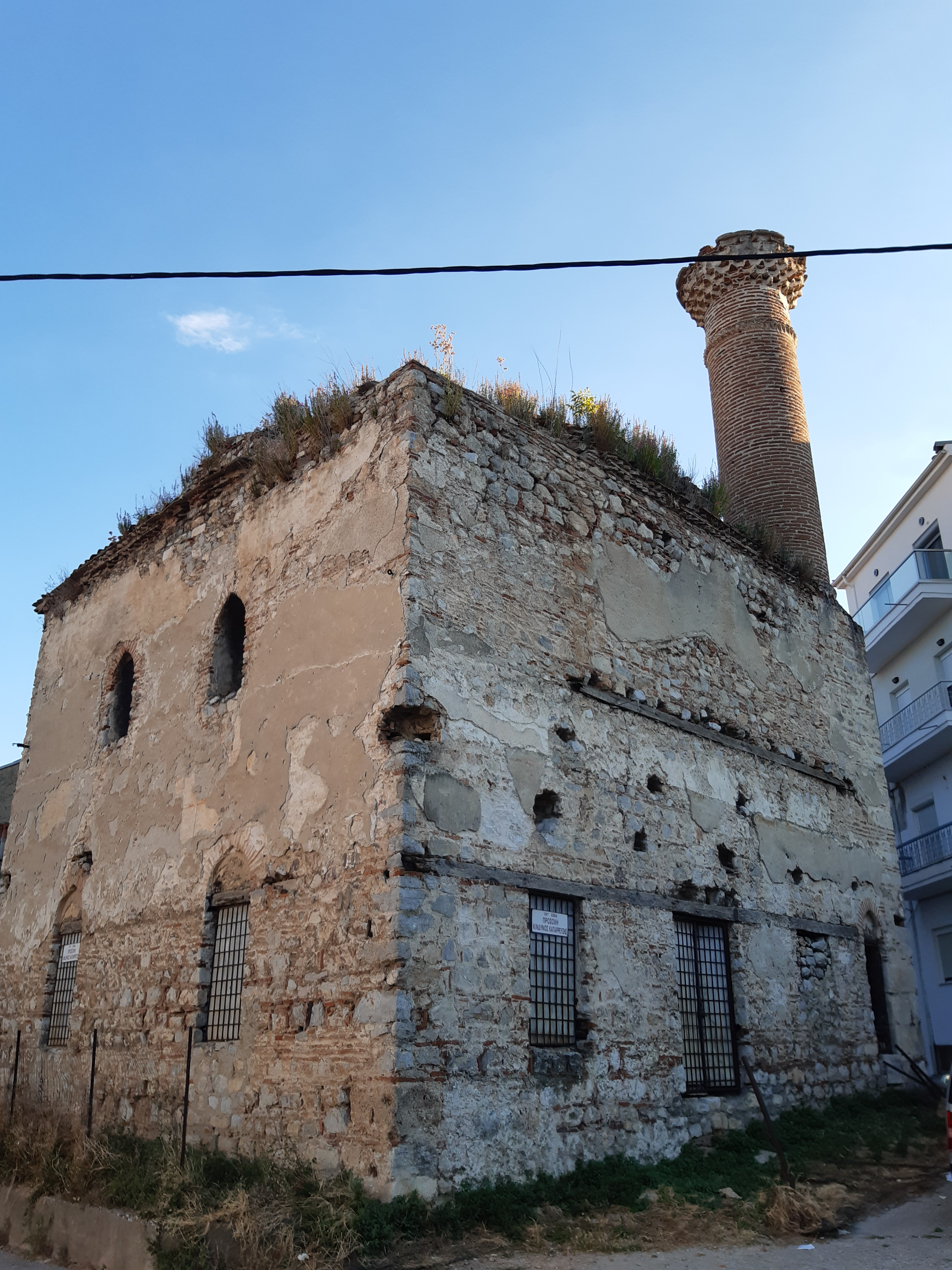
Kursum Mosque

Prodromou Mosque was declared preserved during 1925, later the National Bank sold it and was demolished. Tabahane Mosque was also declared preserved in 1925 and later demolished in unknown circumstances. Hasan Kadi Mosque and Giahli or Giali Mosque were both destroyed. Gazi Mosque was used by the metropolitan and is well preserved. Kursum Mosque, named for its lead roof was declared preserved during 1925. Prior to Muslims leaving Kastoria, its last imam sold the mosque and under Greece has been used as a museum and as an antiquities warehouse, closed to the public. It is the only surviving mosque in Kastoria in a moderate state of preservation and in the early to mid 2020s was undergoing restoration work.

The Bektashi tekke was dedicated to Kasim Baba, a Sufi holy man. It was demolished. Another tekke belonged to the Hayati, an offshoot of the Halveti Order. Three tekkes, one used by Sufis as a hermitage, another by dervishes and a third affiliated with the Mevlevi Order were all demolished. Another three tekkes were destroyed following the population exchange. Burial monuments (turbes) were located in the vicinity of mosques or in Muslim cemeteries, such as one in Kursum Mosque's courtyard, later destroyed. The turbe of Aydin Baba and the turbe of Kasim Baba were located on a hill above Kastoria, both destroyed. Muslim cemeteries were expropriated and demolished.

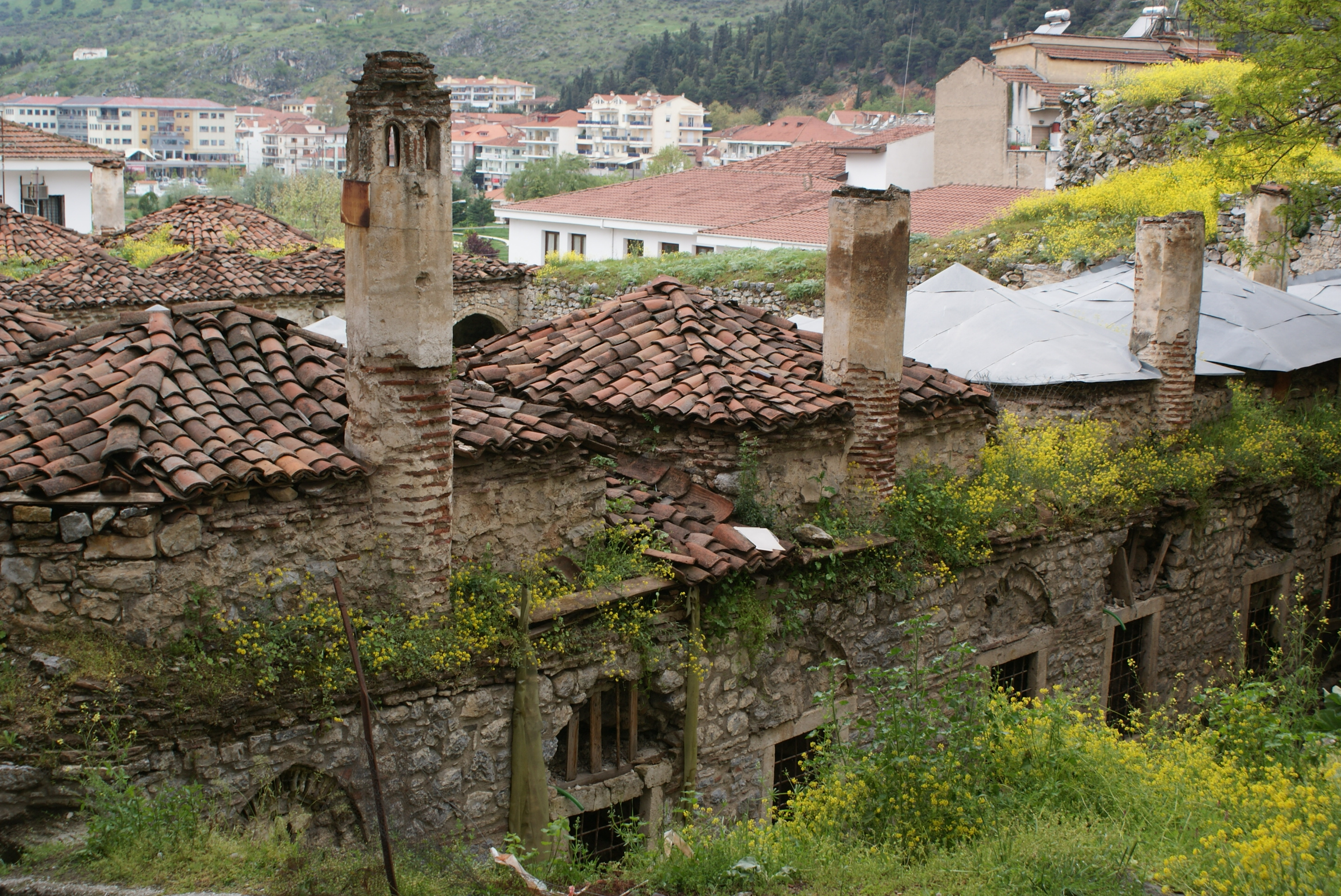
Madrassa of Kastoria

Kastoria's Muslims had four primary schools, an elementary school and a madrassa. The Madrassa, a theological school with an open courtyard was declared a preserved monument by Greece in 1925 and repurposed as a depot for salt and other products. The building is presently closed and abandoned, some restoration has occurred and is in a state of moderate preservation. Remnants of a hamam are located in the Apozari neighbourhood. Portions of Kastoria's Ottoman walls are a protected monument (declared in 1932 and 1945), although some parts were demolished for other building projects. A late Ottoman era guardhouse served as a penal prison till 1958 and was later demolished.

Some Muslim private buildings consisted of large inns and houses belonging to beys, later most were demolished. An unfinished Turkish Konak or official residence, a late Ottoman building was demolished in 1935. The Mathioudakis barracks, a military Ottoman structure from the early twentieth century was used from the interwar period to 2006 by the Greek army, who also erected several buildings within the complex. The Mathioudakis barracks now belongs to Kastoria municipality who has sought to demolish and rebuild it as a police station with pushback from town locals who advocate for its preservation.

=== Modern period ===
Under Greece, support came from Greek politicians such as Ion Dragoumis and Eleftherios Venizelos to conserve Kastoria's architectural uniqueness. Muslims left Kastoria following the population exchange in 1923 and a new urban plan modernised and changed the town's architectural layout and space. Efforts were aimed at conserving churches; other structures such as mansions, walls and Muslim buildings were neglected, with a majority of Ottoman era buildings demolished. The period of the 1930s brought some architectural alterations and overall the town retained its traditional form until the 1960s when new construction proceeded in an anarchic manner changing Kastoria.

== Education ==
The School of Sciences of University of Western Macedonia with two departments (Informatics and Mathematics) is based in the city, as well as the departments of Communication and Digital Media and Economics.

== Cuisine ==
Local specialities include:

- Giouvetsi (meat with pasta in tomato sauce)
- Garoufa (Grivadi soup)
- Pestrofa (trout)
- Lake fish: carp, tench, catfish, eel
- Sarmades (meatballs wrapped with pickled cabbage)
- Makálo (meatballs with garlic sauce)
- Kolokythopita (pumpkin pie)
- Kremmydopita (onion pie)
- Milk Pie (dessert)
- Sáliaroi (dessert)

== Sports ==
Kastoria FC is the city's football team. It was established in 1963 when three local sides joined to form one stronger team to represent Kastoria. The team's most successful years to date were in 1974 when they were promoted to the Greek first division and competed there for a year, and in 1979–1980 when they won the Greek Cup after an impressive 5–2 victory over Iraklis FC in the final.

== Location ==
Bilisht	Florina	Amyntaio – Edessa
Korçë		Ptolemaida – Veria
Ioannina	Neapoli, Kozani – Siatista – Grevena	Kozani – Larissa

== Notable people ==
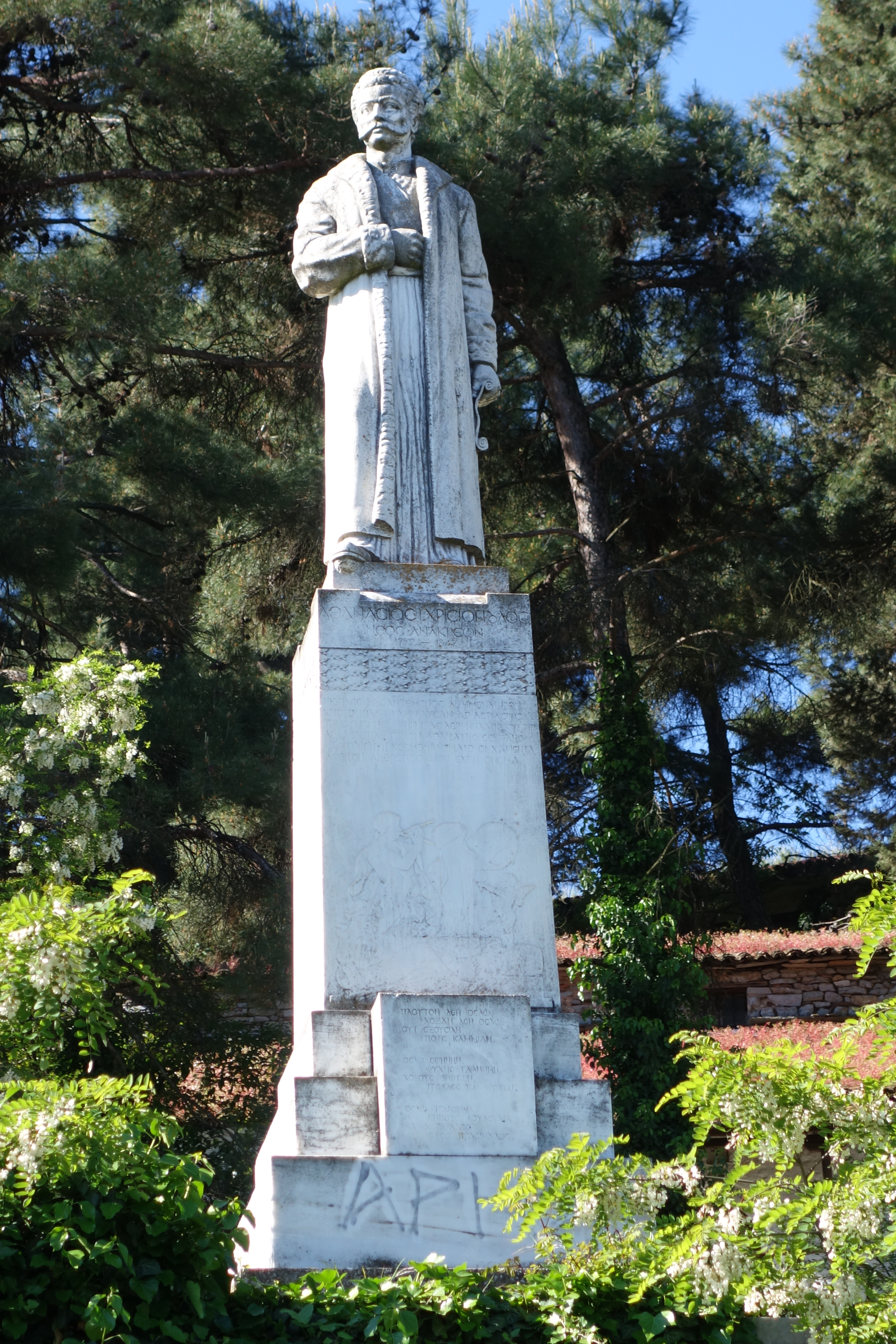
Statue of Athanasios Christopoulos

- Tobiah ben Eliezer (11th), author of the Midrash Lekach Tov
- Kasim Baba, 15th century Ottoman Bektashi holy man.
- Sevastos Leontiadis (1690–1765), educationalist
- Konstantinos Michail, scholar
- Georgios Theocharis (1758–1843), merchant, revolutionary and diplomat
- Athanasios Christopoulos (1772–1847), poet
- Emmanuel brothers, partners of Rigas Feraios; executed with him in 1798
- Vasileios Hatzis, painter
- Aristotelis Zachos, architect
- Pavlos Argyriadis (1849–1901), journalist, lawyer and anarchist/socialist intellectual
- Argyrios Vouzas (1857–?), doctor and revolutionary
- Leonidas Papazoglou, photographer
- Şefik Aker (1877–1964), military officer in the Ottoman and Turkish armies
- Nicholas Lambrinides, founder of Skyline Chili, a famous restaurant chain in Cincinnati, USA
- Andreas Tzimas, communist politician
- Lucas Samaras (1936–2024), artist
- Jagnula Kunovska (1943–2024), politician, jurist and writer
- Maria Spiropulu (1970–), experimental physicist
- Dimitris Diamantidis (1980–), basketball player
- Ioannis Christou, (1983–), Greek rower
- Christina Giazitzidou (1989–), Olympic bronze medalist in rowing

== Twin towns – sister cities ==
Kastoria is twinned with:

- Enna, Italy
- Kyiv, Ukraine (since 1998)
- Plovdiv, Bulgaria (since 2005)

== Gallery ==
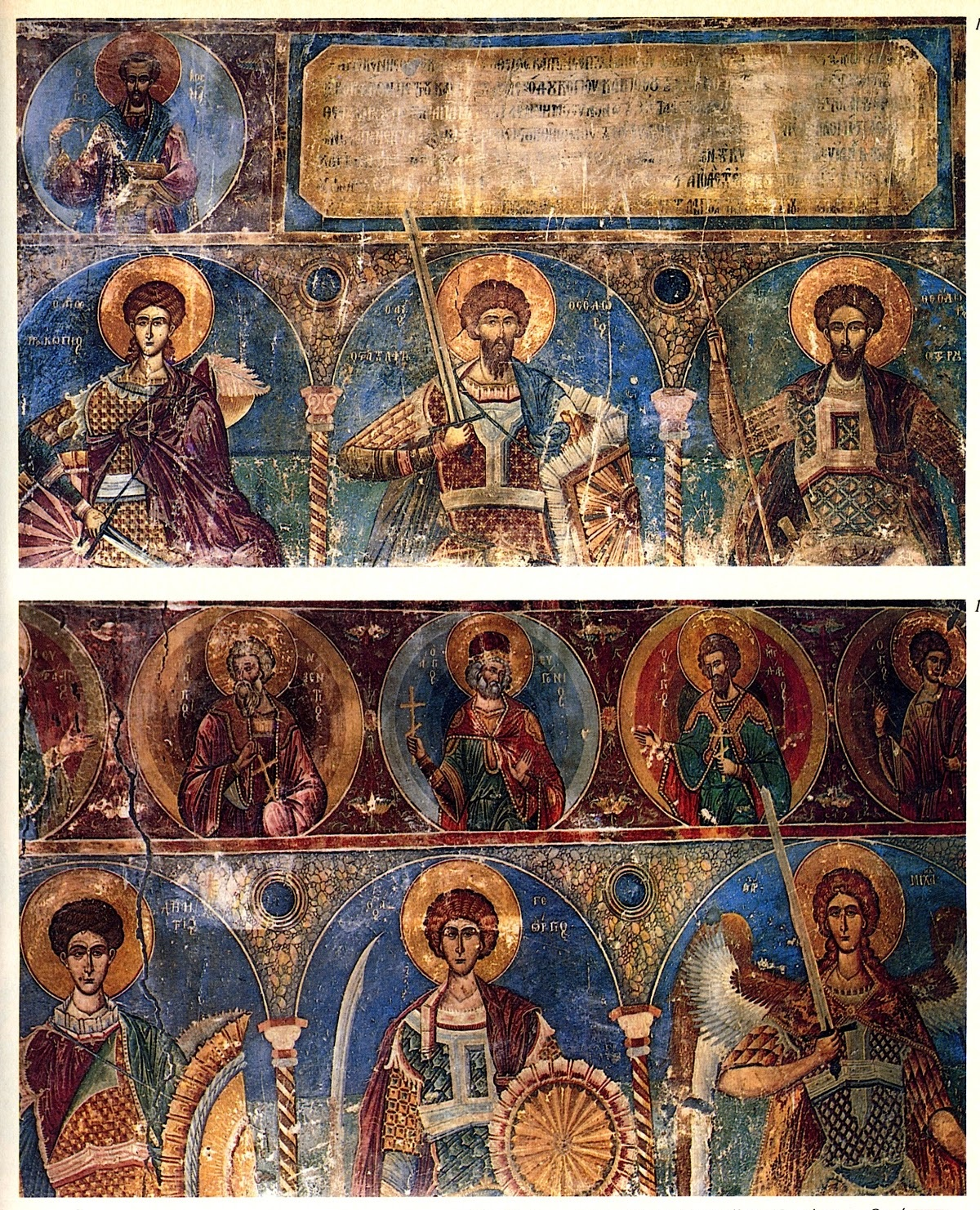
Fresco by Onufri at the Holy Apostles church

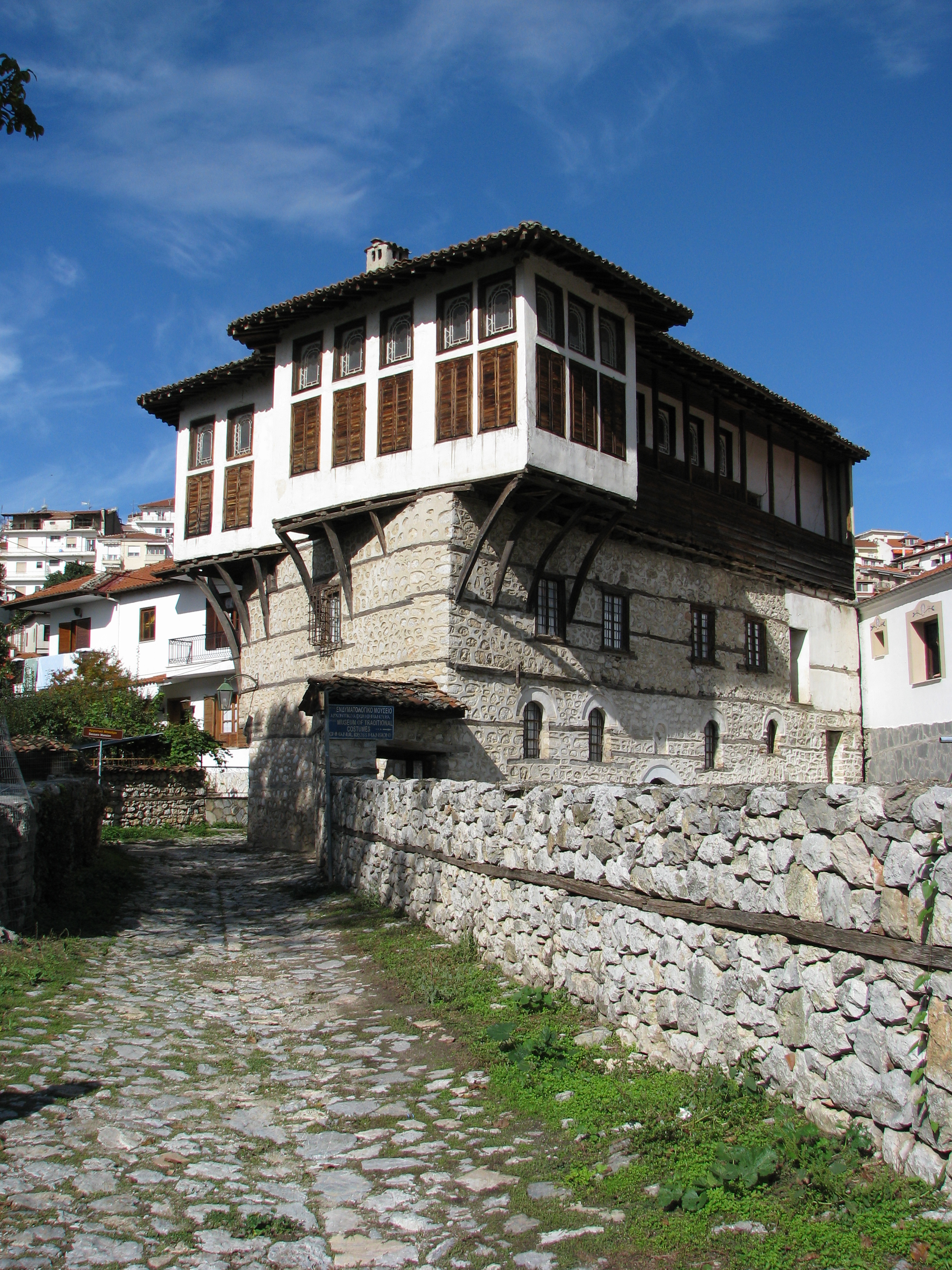
Emmanuel mansion (18th c.), currently housing the Costume Museum

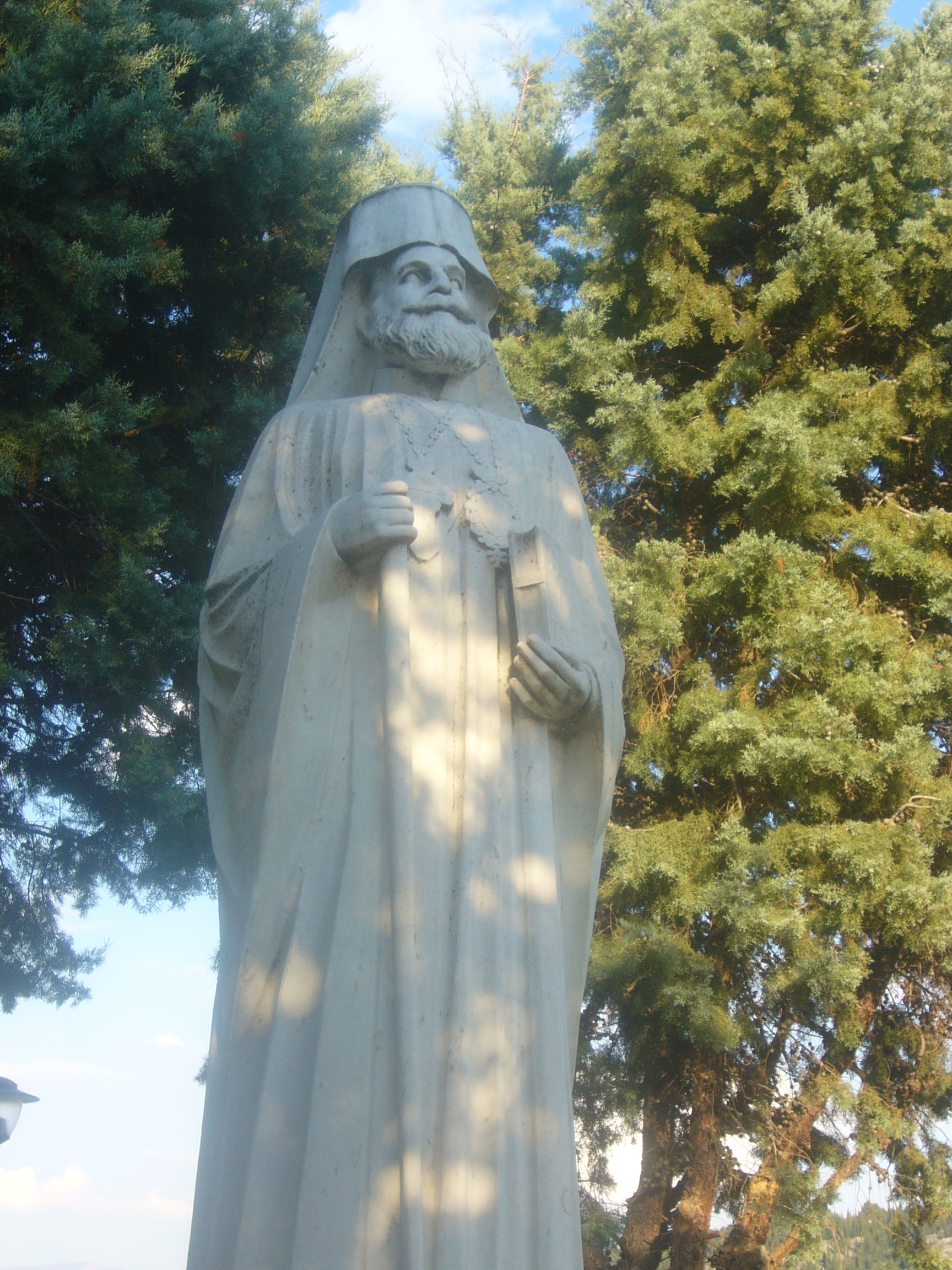
A statue of Germanos Karavangelis

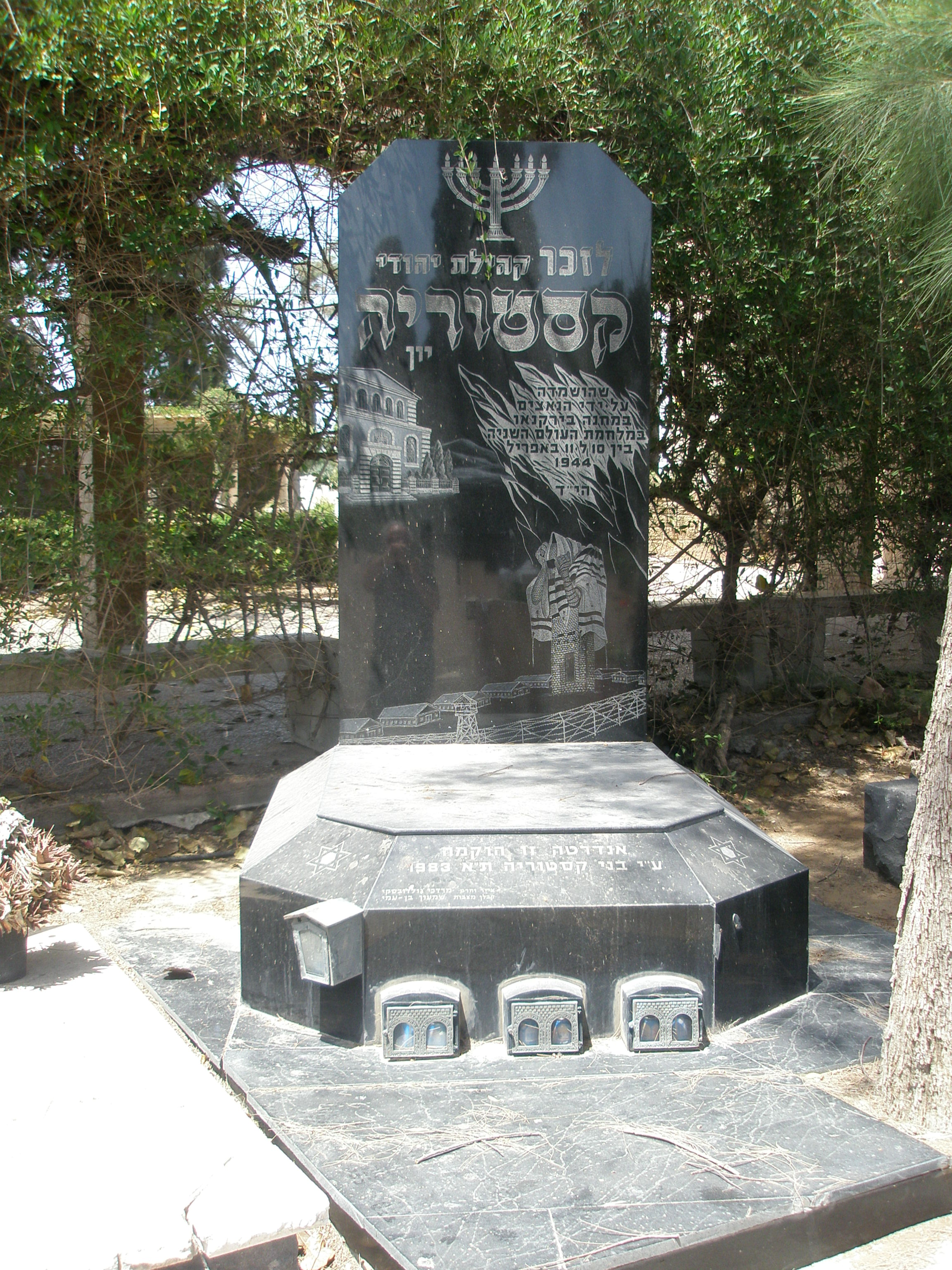
Memorial to Holocaust victims of Kastoria in Israel

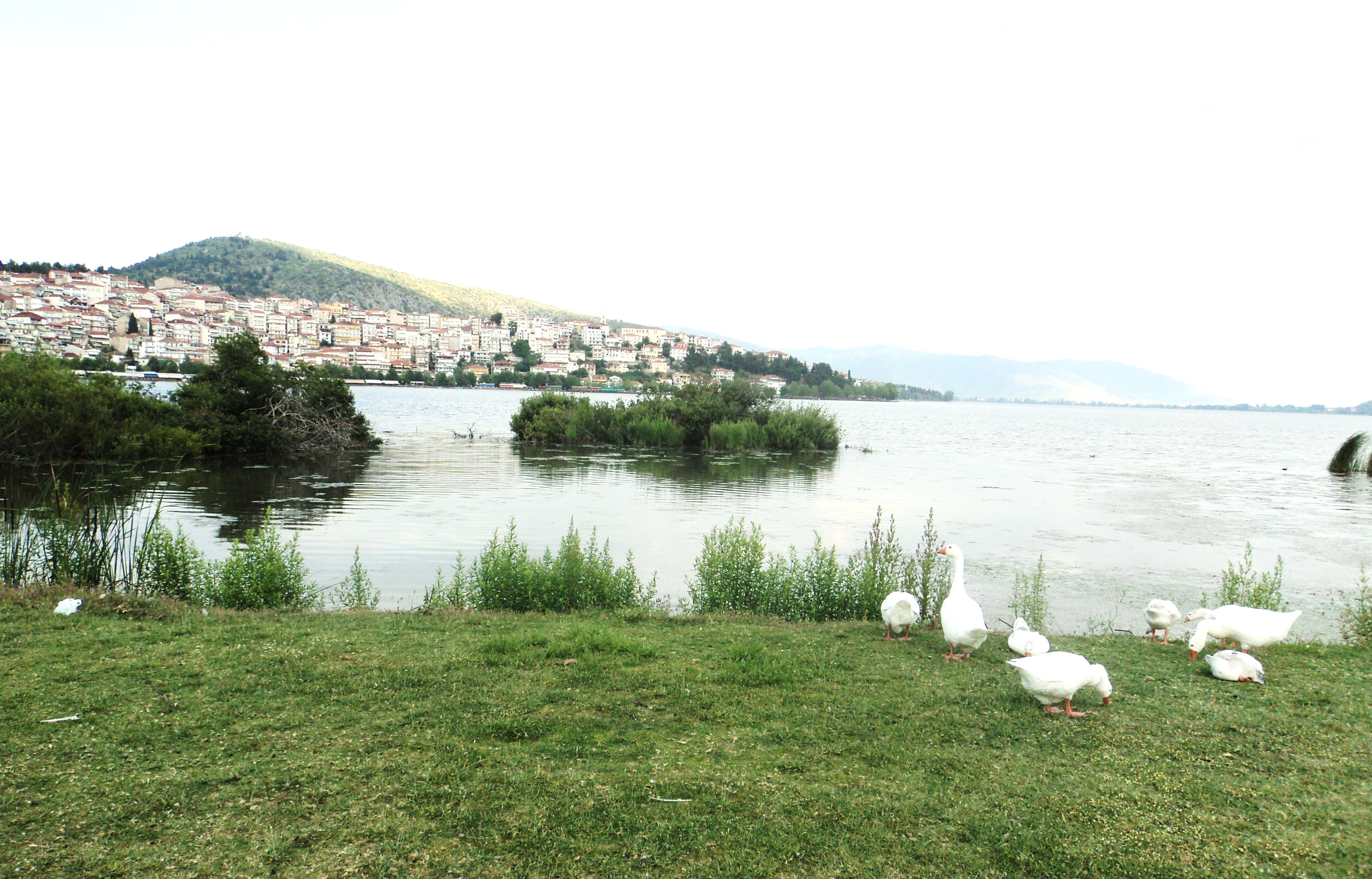
Geese at the Lake of Kastoria

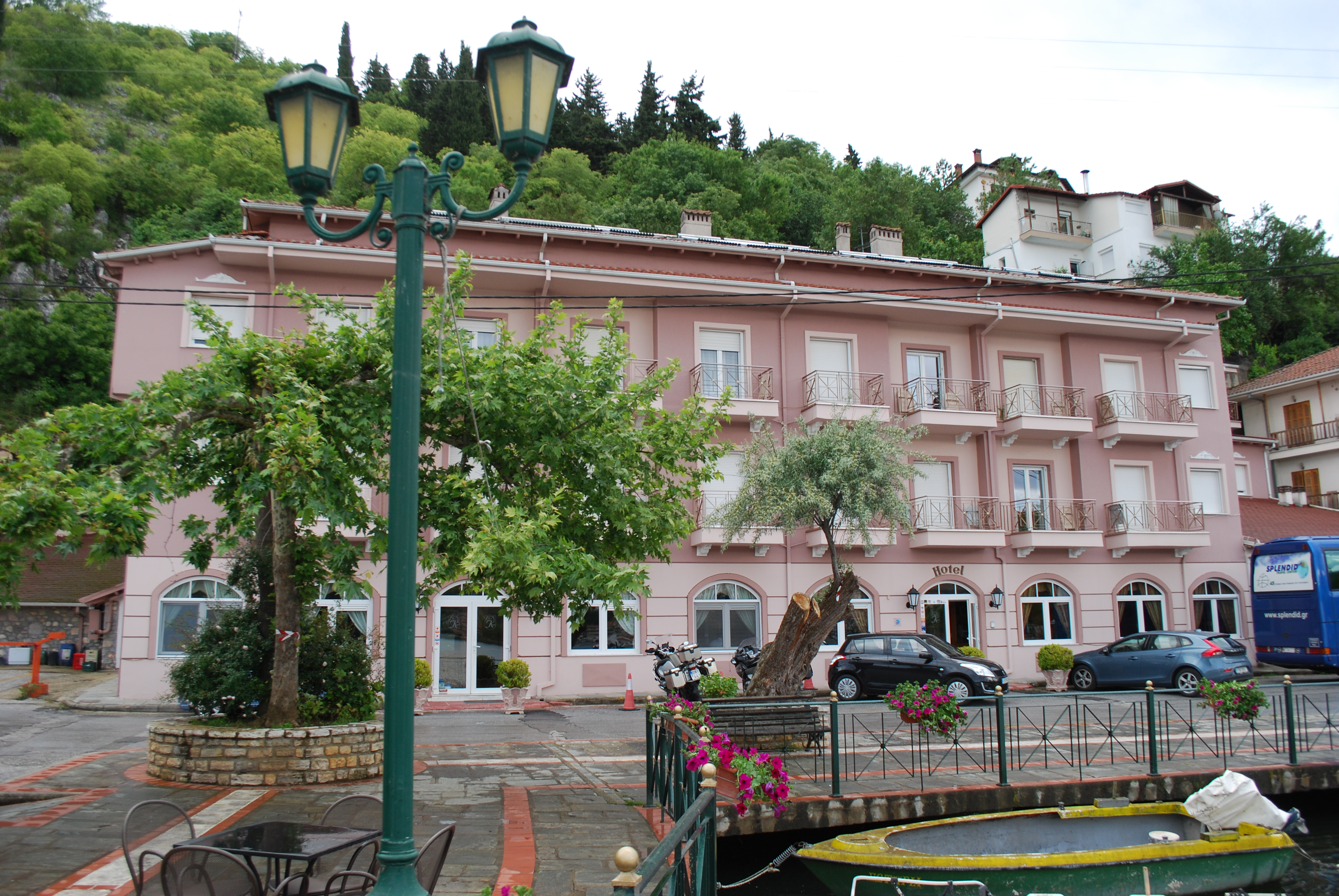
Hotel "Kastoria"

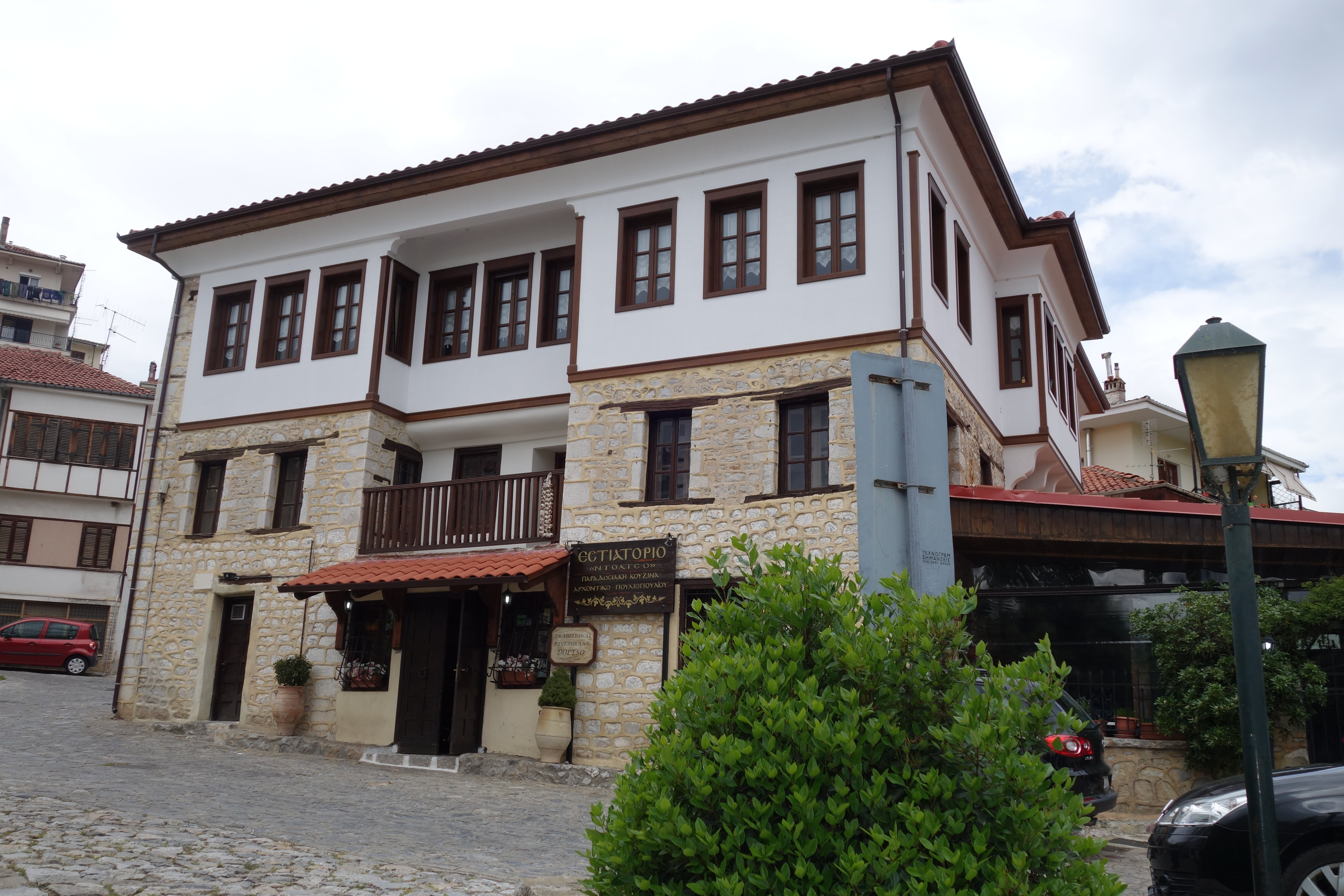
Pouliopoulos mansion

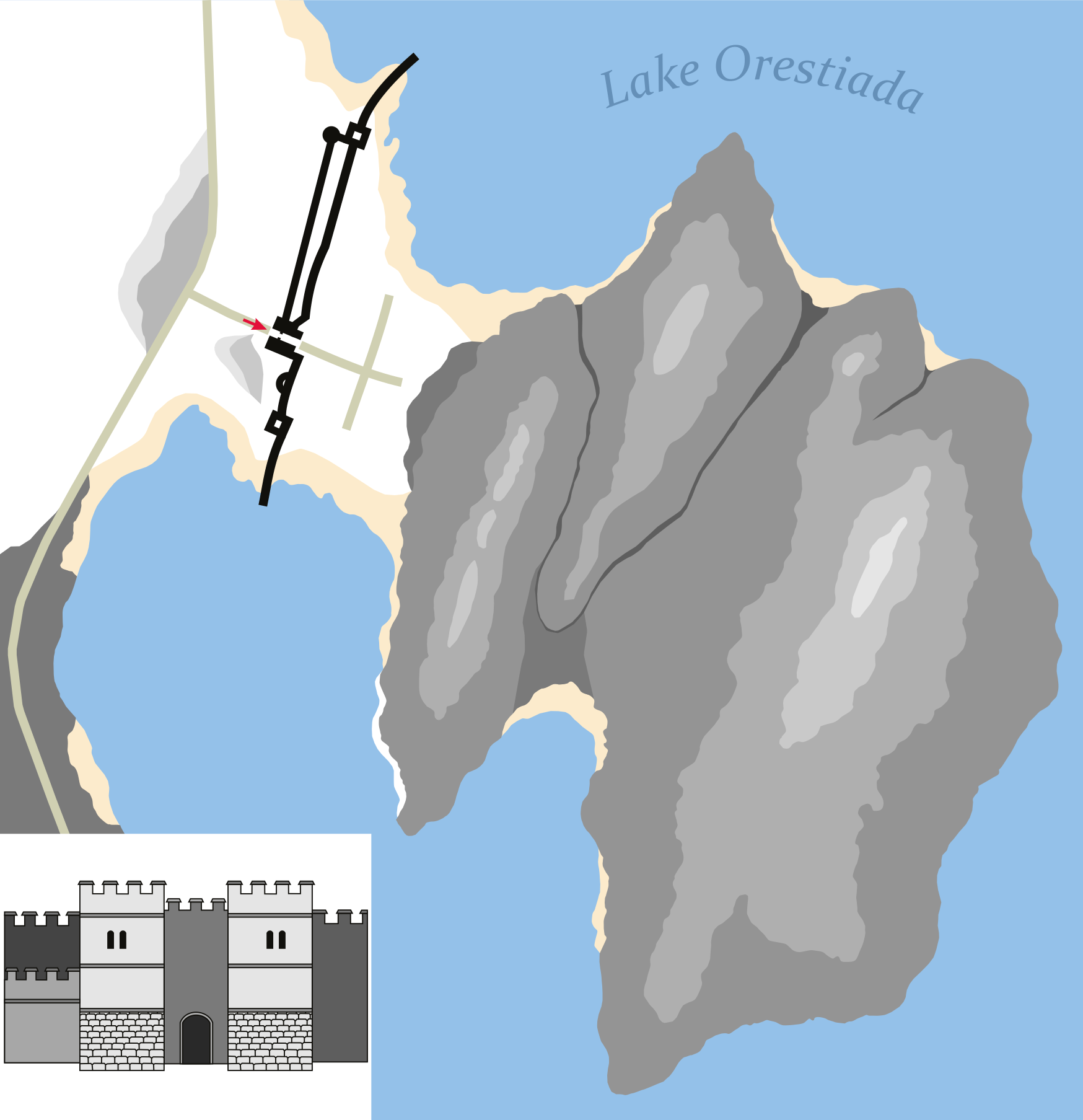
Plan of the medieval Bulgarian fortress

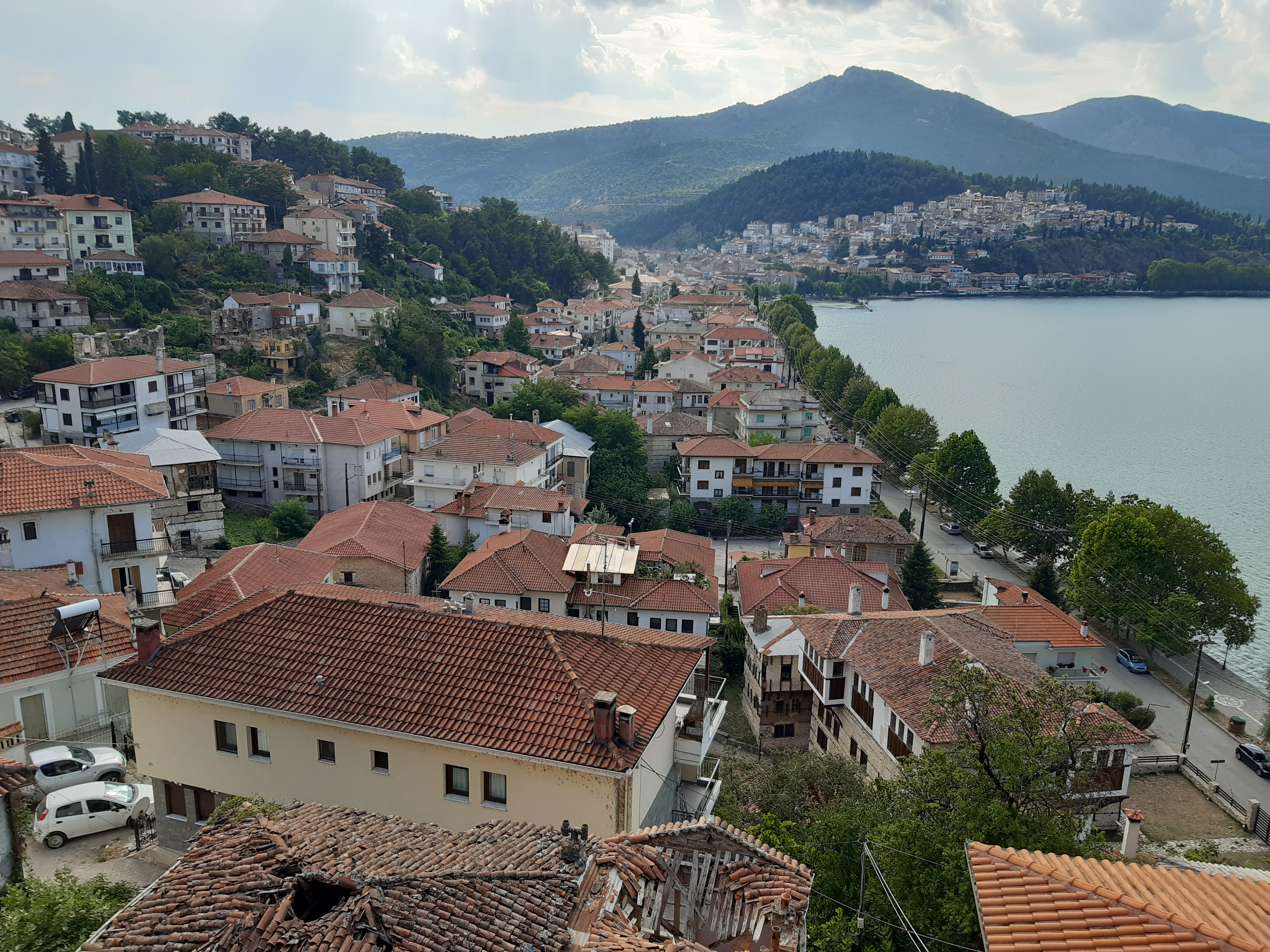
View of the old town district of "Apozari"

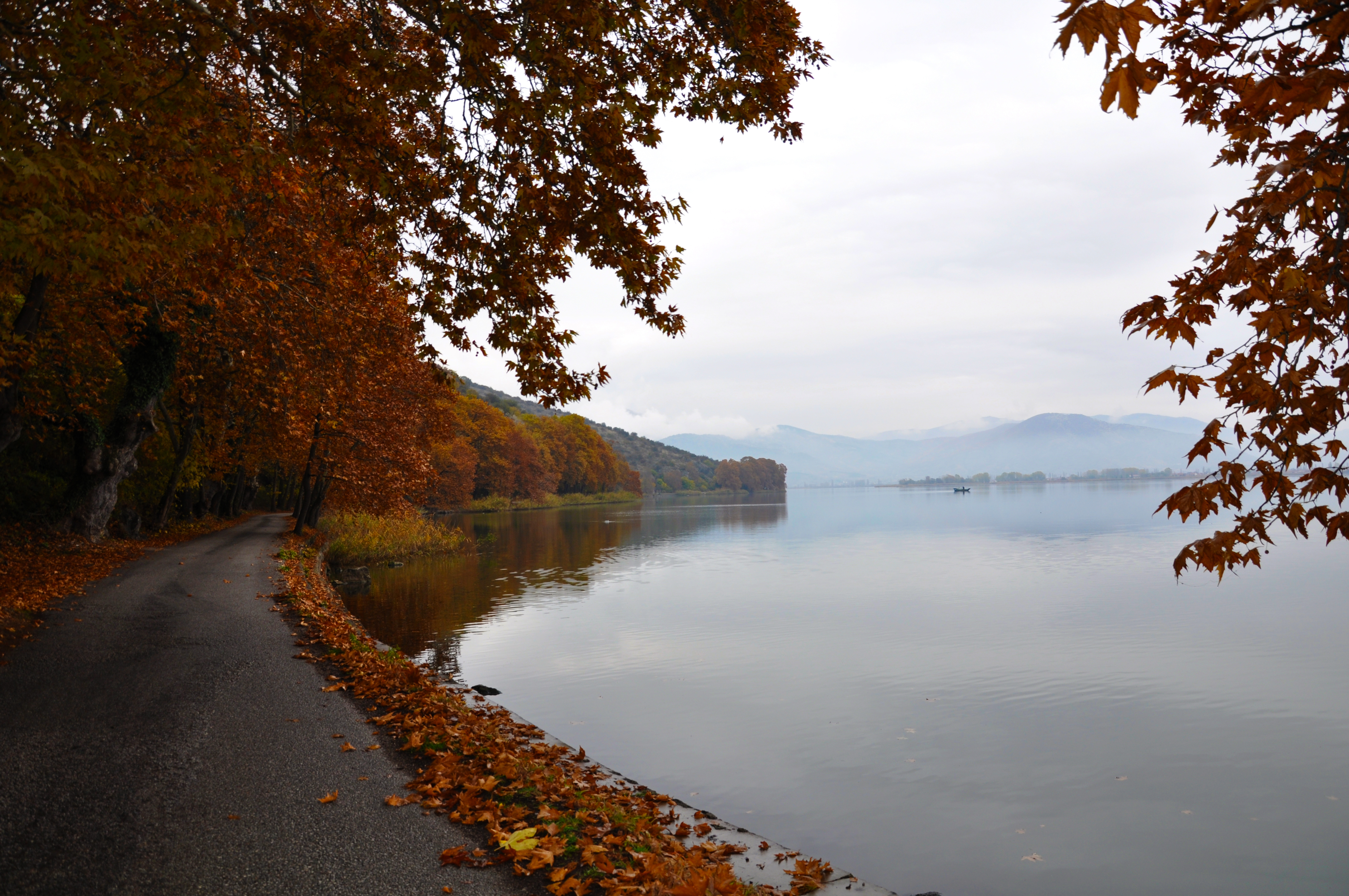
The lake in autumn

== See also ==
- Castoria (titular see) (Latin Catholic)
- Metropolis of Kastoria (now Greek Orthodox)
- Delinanios Folklore Museum
- Byzantine Museum of Kastoria
- Paleontological and Paleobotanical Museum of Nostimo, a village 25 km (16 mi) from Kastoria
- Kastorianos, folk dance from Greek Macedonia

== Bibliography ==
- Karavangelis, Germanos (1993). Απομνημονεύματα Γερμανού Καραβαγγέλη – Ο Μακεδονικός Αγών (in Greek). Thessaloniki: Μπαρμπουνάκης.
- Mela, Natalia P. (1992). Παύλος Μελάς (in Greek). Δωδώνη.
- Vakalopoulos, Apostolos E. (1973). History of Macedonia, 1354–1833. Institute for Balkan Studies.
