= Kefalari, Kastoria =

Kefalari
- Settlement
- Location within Greece
- Coordinates: 40°31′15″N 21°24′36″E
- Country: Greece
- Geographic region: Macedonia
- Administrative region: Western Macedonia
- Regional unit: Kastoria
- Municipality: Kastoria
- Municipal unit: Kastoria
- Community: Kastoria

Population (2021)
  - Total: 447
- Time zone: UTC+2 (EET)
  - Summer (DST): UTC+3 (EEST)

Kefalari (Greek: Κεφαλάρι, before 1926: Σέτομα – Setoma) is a village in Kastoria Regional Unit, Macedonia, Greece. It is part of the community of Kastoria.

The 1920 Greek census recorded 408 people in the village, and 164 inhabitants (30 families) were Muslim in 1923. Following the Greek–Turkish population exchange, Greek refugee families in Setoma were from Asia Minor (16) and Pontus (9) in 1926. The 1928 Greek census recorded 371 village inhabitants. In 1928, the refugee families numbered 25 (104 people).

In 1945, Greek Foreign Minister Ioannis Politis ordered the compilation of demographic data regarding the Prefecture of Kastoria. The village Kefalari had a total of 580 inhabitants, and was populated by 290 Slavophones with a Bulgarian national consciousness.
