= Georgios Theocharis (diplomat) =

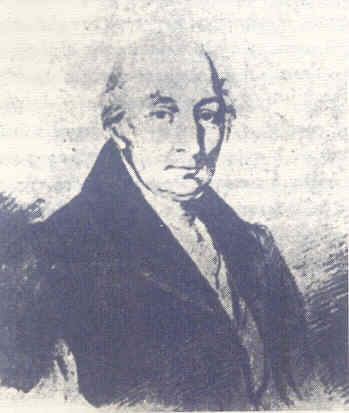
Georgios Theocharis

Georgios Theocharis (Greek: Γεώργιος Θεοχάρης; 1758–1843) was a Greek merchant and notable figure of the pre Greek Revolution period and a fellow of Rigas Feraios.

== Biography ==
Georgios Theocharis was born in 1758 in Kastoria, then Ottoman Empire. In 1786 he married Austrian Anna Spigel; they had three children: Dimitrios, Nikolaos and Aikaterini. In 1786 he was initiated into Balduin zur Linde of Leipzig, later reaching the Professor's Degree. At the end of 1797 he was arrested with Rigas Feraios but his surrender to the Ottoman authorities was prevented because of his wife's intercession. In 1798 he was exiled from Vienna and later allowed to go to Leipzig. His secret and intimate relationship with Feraios was revealed by the letter Rigas sent him from Trieste, which was signed as "Coleader of the Vienna Group". He supported financially, earnestly and variedly, and through his relations with abroad, the issue and circulation of Feraios' revolutionary proclamation. After Otto's arrival in Greece, Theocharis served as the first consul of the Greek state in Leipzig from 1834 until 1843. He was proclaimed Knight of the Golden Cross of the Order of the Redeemer. He died in 1843 in Leipzig.
