= Bilal Xhaferi Publishing House =

- Native name: Shtëpia Botuese "Bilal Xhaferi"
- Type: Publishing company
- Industry: Publishing
- Founded: 1992
- Headquarters: Albania
- Products: Books; Magazines
- Owner: Shefki Hysa
- Website: bxhph.wordpress.com

Bilal Xhaferi Publishing House (BXhPH) , in Albanian: Shtëpia Botuese "Bilal Xhaferi", is the first publishing institution of the democratic era, after 1990, when the communist dictatorship in Albania collapsed. It is owned by Shefki Hysa.

== History ==
Bilal Xhaferi Publishing House was established by a group of Albanian writers, journalists and intellectuals who represented the free thought and supported the Albanian and Balkans dissident literature, the American-English literature and the literary and artistic trends that propagated peace and prosperity around the world. This new publishing institution took the name of the dissident writer Bilal Xhaferi.

== Activity ==
Bilal Xhaferi Publishing House started the activity of publishing the literary works of the dissident Bilal Xhaferi such as the romance "Bloody Love" (Albanian: Dashuri e përgjakur) and the novel "Krastakraus", a novel which was dedicated to the figure of Skanderbeg. Bilal Xhaferi Publishing House continued its publications with selected works of other Albanian dissident writers such as Pjetër Arbnori, Bilal Xhaferi, Namik Mane and Kasem Trebeshina, and the translation and publication of world-known authors like Alfred de Musset, Jean-Paul Sartre, Edgar Allan Poe, Jack London, W. Somerset Maugham, Katherine Mansfield, Christina Rossetti, etc.
In collaboration with organizations Albania such as Albanian League of Writers and Artists, and Bilal Xhaferi Cultural Association, and international organizations such as Diplomatic Mission Peace and Prosperity, Bilal Xhaferi Publishing House has published and continues to publish in Albanian and English also works of the activists of the protection of human rights and peace missionaries who have been devoted to the peace and prosperity in the Balkans and around the world. Bilal Xhaferi Publishing House publishes also the magazine "Krahu i Shqiponjës" (English: Eagle's Wing), a bilingual magazine in Albanian and English published since 1 October 1974 in the United States, Chicago, by Bilal Xhaferi.

== See also ==
- Albanian literature
- Bilal Xhaferi Cultural Association
- Bilal Xhaferi
