= Diplomatic Mission Peace and Prosperity =

Diplomatic Mission Peace and Prosperity (DMPP) is an international lobbying organization initiated by a group of diplomats from western countries with the intention of creating powerful lobbies to support the developing countries, registered in Albania, NATO, United States, European Union and other global organizations.

== History ==
Diplomatic Mission Peace and Prosperity has been established by the initiative of the former American ambassador Richard Holbrooke, as a peace mission in the Balkans and around the world, under the ideas of the movement for Peace and Prosperity of the former American President Dwight D. Eisenhower. DMPP is a global organization for peace supported by a big group of diplomats worldwide. A huge contribution for the establishment of this mission has been given also by Dr. Ibrahim Rugova, former President of Kosovo. Diplomatic Mission Peace and Prosperity works for the creation of more powerful lobbies with world personalities in support of Balkans’ democratic developments, of those of the countries under development, according to the UN's principles and American democracy. This mission lobbies to teach the countries under development how to self-govern according to the model of the American democracy. The activity of DMPP is extended in Albania, Kosovo, Montenegro, Macedonia, Italy, Israel, Turkey, France, Belgium, United States, South America, Africa, Australia, India, etc. Diplomatic Mission Peace and Prosperity collaborates with many personalities, peace missionaries, diplomats and politicians from the Balkans and different countries of the World. Collaborators of this mission are also many personalities who have given their contributions for the global peace, such as American Senator Bob Dole, General Wesley Clark, Prince Michael of Kent, diplomat Dr. Haim Reitan, Ambassador William Weiss, American Congressman Devin Nunes, American Congressman Gary Peters, Dr. Roberto Cohen, Dr. Madhu Krishan, Dr.Neeraj Tandan, Diplomat political Balkans Forum, Jennifer Lim, etc. Other contributions for peace and prosperity which come through DMPP have been given also by the missionaries from Balkans such as Dr. Ilir Meta, Dr. Namik Dokle, Dr. Petro Koçi, Dr. Gani Hoxha, Dr. Makbule Çeço, Albanian deputy Shpëtim Idrizi, Albanian writer Dritëro Agolli, weightlifting champion Muharrem Berisha, Hashim Thaçi, Prime Minister of Kosovo politician Hajredin Kuçi, etc. Diplomatic Mission Peace and Prosperity is partner with many international organizations who work for peace and prosperity around the world. DMPP collaborates especially with institutions who protect the human rights such as American Diplomatic Mission for World Peace, International Human Rights Commission, International Diplomatic Cooperation and Security, Planet Diplomat, Diplomatic Society of St Gabriel, Academy of Universal Global Peace, People to People, American University, Logos University International (UniLogos), etc.

== Objectives ==
Diplomatic Mission Peace and Prosperity lobbies for Human rights, Peace, Security, climate change and sustainable development to bring the investments of civilized countries such as United States, etc., in the countries under development such as Africa, the Balkans, etc. This mission takes under protection the immigrants and citizens of the Balkans, citizens who are at difficulty in the dictatorial countries at a time of political crisis, wars and natural disasters. DMPP publishes articles, books, documentaries, video clips, etc., for peace missionary personalities who help the countries under development to get developed and democratized and to perfect the legal state. DMPP helps the talented boys and girls of the Balkans to get educated in universities such as Harvard, Oxford, Sorbonne, American University, Logos Instituto University of East Anglia, etc., to graduate as diplomats and leader economists who are capable to lead corporations, multinational companies, banks and international institutions that dictate the policies of the development of the regions and the whole world. DMPP fulfills every objective that it is related to the policies of peace and prosperity all over the world.

== Bibliography ==
- Hysa, Shefki (2008). The Diplomacy of self-denial (Diplomacia e vetëmohimit), publicistic, Tirana. Kristalina-KH. ISBN 978-9995665036.
- Rranzi, Paulin (2011). Personalities - Missionaries of Peace (Personalitete - Misionarë të Paqes). Tirana. ISBN 978-99956-43-60-7.
- Selmani, Namik (2012). Albanian language dominates (Gjuhëshqipja të zonjërojë). Tirana. ISBN 978-9928-140-29-6.

== See also ==
- Bilal Xhaferri Cultural Association
- Bilal Xhaferri Publishing House
- Shefki Hysa
- Krahu i shqiponjës
