= The White Juga =

1971 novel by Jakov Xoxa

The White Juga (originally Juga e Bardhē)
- Author: Jakov Xoxa
- Language: Albanian
- Genre: Drama, Fiction
- Publication date: 1971
- Publication place: Albania

The White Juga, (Albanian: Juga e Bardhē), is an Albanian novel written by Jakov Xoxa in 1971.

The trend of criticizing small town mayors and other less significant government officials instead of highly ranked authorities, which was prominent in the period the book was published, found its way in this novel. This was later surpassed boldly by Dritëro Agolli in his novel "Splendour and fall of comrade Zylo", in which he openly criticizes ministers for being corrupt.

== Setting ==
White Juga is an informal sequel to the author’s earlier work The Dead River, consequently the setting in which the main story takes place is Pre-World War II Albania, more specifically a small town called Trokth.

== Plot ==
White Juga revolves mainly around the corruption of the administration of the town Trokth, personified by the main antagonist Kiu Koroziu. Some characters from The Dead River reappear in White Juga.

== See also ==
- Albanian literature
- The Dead River
