= Krahu i shqiponjës =

Albanian national magazine

"Krahu i Shqiponjës", interview with Tahir Muhedini.

Krahu i shqiponjës ("Eagle's Wing") is an Albanian national magazine that first appeared in the democratic post-communist period, in Tirana (Albania), in 1995, in progress of Bilal Xhaferri's magazine, which was published in Chicago, United States. The spiritual leader was and still remains Bilal Xhaferri.

== History ==
Eagle's Wing is a political, cultural, literary and social magazine that was first published in 1974, in two languages: Albanian and English, as an organ of the Cham League in Chicago, United States. The Albanian dissident writer Bilal Xhaferri was the founder, editor and leader of this magazine. (Bilal Xhaferri was born on November 2, 1935, in Ninat, Konispol, and after a dissident literary - publicistic activity was obliged to escape from the communist Albania in 1969 and find a shelter in Chicago, United States, where he died on October 14, 1986). "Eagle's wing" magazine stopped being published with Bilal Xhaferri's death. This magazine was characterized by an anti-communist spirit.

Eagle's Wing magazine was a free democratic thinking tribune. Among the magazine's pages, Albanian national problems were treated, especially the Cham issue, Kosovo problem and problems of Albanian communities around the world and in Diaspora.

Bilal Xhaferri could communicate through Eagle's Wing magazine with a lot of Albanian intellectuals in United States, Europe and Canada, Australia, Turkey and elsewhere, with newspapers and other Albanian magazines of Diaspora, and also with other organs of the international press.

Among the pages of Eagle's Wing magazine, besides the publications of many foreign and Albanian authors, Bilal Xhaferri published even his works, a lot of publicistic articles, poetry, stories and fragments of the novel Opposite Sidewalks (1975), fragments of the novel The Moon of the yards (1977), skits for the Albanian language courses that were situated near mosques, masjids or Albanian churches in exile. He also published his drawings and caricatures, artistic photos and short films made by him. He wrote in USA movie scenarios. In the magazine number, where was published for the first time a passage from the novel The Moon of the Yards, it was advertised the fact that he was producing a scenario from this novel for a full-length feature film under the adapted title in English The Moon of the Countryside. A company from Hollywood was going to film it.

Because of the anti-communist activities of its founder Bilal Xhaferri, the editorial office of Eagle's Wing magazine was set on fire in 1981. Several attempts on his life were also made by agents of the Albanian secret police. Bilal Xhaferri was able to publish 39 issues.

Since 1995 Eagle's Wing magazine is being published in Tirana, as the organ of the Cultural Association “Bilal Xhaferri” (The Cultural Community of Chameria), founded and directed by the journalist and writer Shefki Hysa. He initiated the return of Bilal Xhaferri's remains in Albania. The magazine is published in the Albanian language and partially in English, French, German and Italian.

In the magazine's pages, besides editions that defend Albanian national issue, notably the Cham and Kosovo problem, have often been published even articles and selected compositions by the personalities of the Albanian pens such as: Bilal Xhaferri, Dritëro Agolli, Ismail Kadare, Jakup Mato, Martin Mato, Namik Mane, Pjetër Arbnori, Arben Çokaj, Sazan Goliku, Sokol Jakova, Shefki Hysa, Vath Koreshi, Visar Zhiti etc. You can find in the pages of this magazine even articles, interviews and portraits of many Albanian politicians, such as: Sali Berisha, Sabri Godo, Bamir Topi, Besnik Mustafaj, Fatmir Mediu, Skënder Gjinushi, Edi Rama, Ilir Meta etc., and of Kosovo politicians such as: Ibrahim Rugova, Hashim Thaçi, Sabri Hamiti etc.

Even creations of global authors such as: Alfred de Musset, Christina Rossetti, Edgar Allan Poe, Jack London, Jean-Paul Sartre etc., have been published in this magazine.

The foreign authors who have notably treated the Chame issue like Miranda Vickers, Doris Pack, Hillary Clinton, James Pettifer and Dr. Haim Reitan etc., have taken a special place in Eagle's Wing magazine and they will do the same in the future.

== Bibliography ==
- Agim Musta, Enver Memisha, Anthology of wounds under the communist terror, 2 (2006), Tirana, ISBN 99943-38-12-9
- Ahmet Mehmeti, Nectar of the Albanian soul (2007), Tirana, ISBN 978-99943-50-13-1
- Bilal Xhaferri, Beyond distances, prose and publicistic (1996), Tirana, ISBN 99927-1-939-7
- Hekuran Halili, Me, the Man! (2007), Saranda, ISBN 978-99943-966-6-5
- Ibrahim D. Hoxha, Southern-Albanian Encyclopedia 1 (A – H), 2006, Tirana, ISBN 99943-855-2-6
- Sabri Hamiti, The cursed poet - Bilal Xhaferri (1996), Pristina
- Shefki Hysa, The Diplomacy of self-denial (Diplomacia e vetëmohimit), publicistic, Tirana, 2008, ISBN 978-9995665036

== See also ==
- Chameria
- Cham Albanians
- Chameria Issue
- Party for Justice and Integration
