= Sabri Hamiti =

Albanian poet, essayist, novelist, academic, and politician (born 1050)

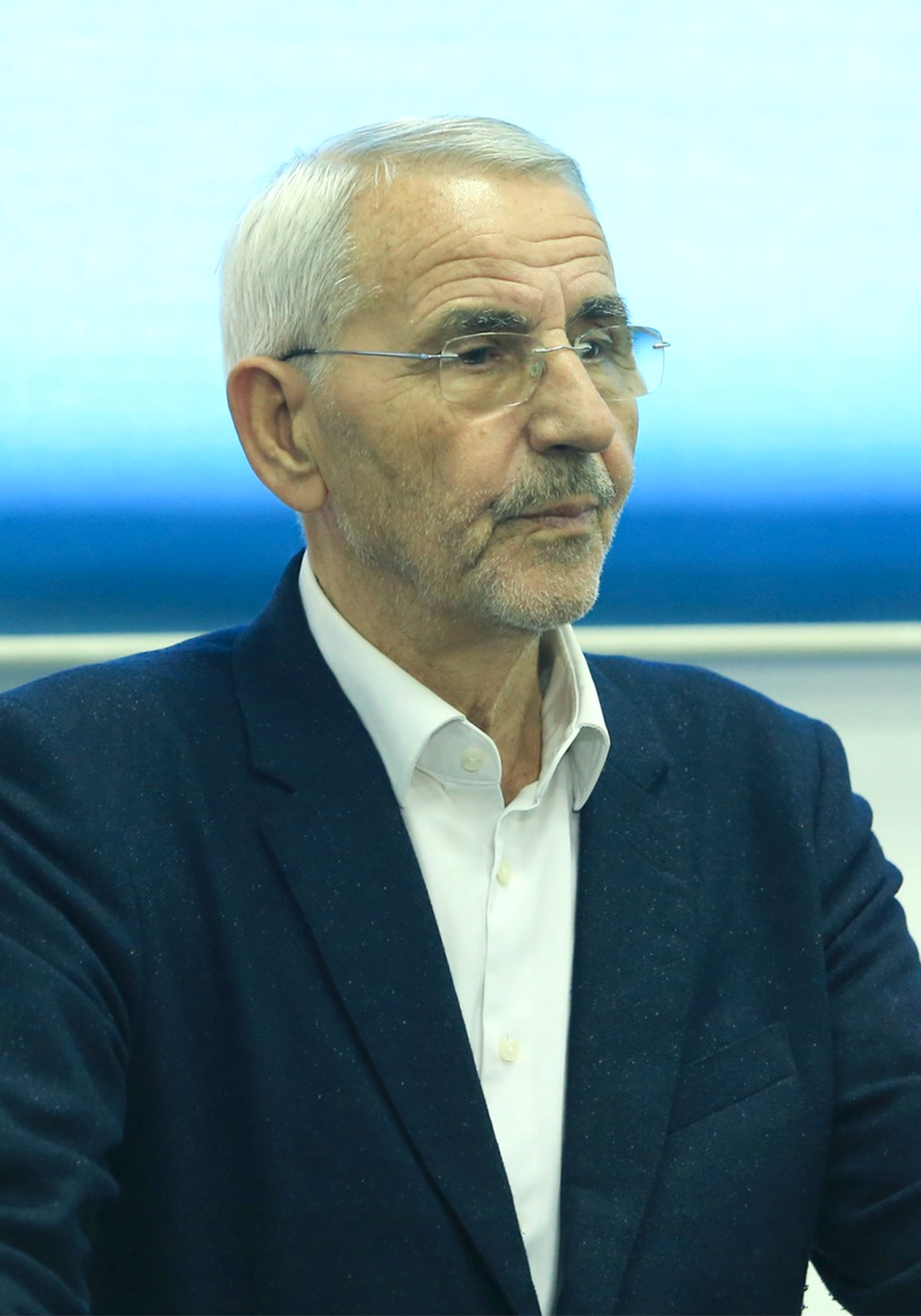
- Portrait of Sabri Hamiti in 2024
- Born: 10 May 1950 (age 76); Dumnicë e Poshtme, Podujevë, Kosovo
- Education: University of Pristina; University of Zagreb; École pratique des hautes études
- Occupations: Poet, novelist, playwright, literary critic, academic, politician
- Writing career
- Period: 1972–2025
- Literary movement: Postmodern literature

Sabri Hamiti (born 10 May 1950 in Dumnicë, Kosovo) is an Albanian writer, literary scholar, and academic.

== Biography ==
Sabri Hamiti (born 10 May 1950, in Dumnicë e Poshtme, Podujeva) is an Albanian writer, scholar, literature professor, and academic from Kosovo.

He completed his studies in Albanian language and literature at the University of Pristina in 1972, later pursuing postgraduate studies in Paris and Zagreb. He earned a PhD in contemporary Albanian literature in 1987.

Hamiti joined Kosovo's independence movement in 1989 and was elected to the Assembly of Kosovo for seven terms, serving in its Presidency from 2006 to 2017. From 1993 to 2020, he was a professor of Albanian literature at the University of Pristina.

In 1998, he survived an assassination attempt by Serbian secret police.

He is a member of the Kosova Academy of Sciences and Arts (full member since 2008) and a foreign member of the Academy of Sciences of Albania since 2023.

He lives and works in Pristina.

== Literary work ==
Hamiti’s poetry is marked by thematic and linguistic rebellion against previous literature, exemplified in works such as Njeriu vdes i ri ("Man Dies Young"). His writings explore self-knowledge, personal memories, and cultural identity with rhythm, rhyme, and musicality. His book Trungu ilir ("Illyrian Stock") is a cult work dramatized on stage but banned by censorship. Its companion work, Leja e njohtimit ("Identity Paper," 1985), explores endangered identity with allusions to Orwell's 1984. The collection Kaosmos addresses the fear and torture of systemic oppression, depicting the journey through "paradise," "purgatory," and "hell." Other works like ABC catalogue ethnic suffering, and Melankolia reflects on the consequences of a brutal world.

His novel of youth, Njëqind vjet vetmi ("One Hundred Years of Solitude"), layers the psychology of loneliness across generations, weaving Albanian history and folklore into a narrative of identity.

Dramatic works Futa and Misioni, Pasioni and Maja respond to Kosovo's late 20th-century struggles, portraying tragic Albanian heroes caught between betrayal and sacrifice.

His theoretical works subtitled Sprovat për një poetikë ("Essays Toward a Poetics"), which analyzes all periods of Albanian literature, culminating in his personal poetics in Bioletra.

Hamiti also wrote literary monographs on notable Albanian authors, including Hivzi Sylejmani, Nazmi Rrahmani, Bilal Xhaferi, Anton Pashku, Ndre Mjedja, Naim Frashëri, Zef Pllumi and Gjergj Fishta, tracing traditional and modern literary currents.

His poetry collections Sympathia: testamente për Urtakun (2004) and Melankolia (1999) mix personal and metaphysical themes, while his studies Bioletra, Tematologjia, and Albanizma form a trilogy on Albanian poetics.

His book Utopia letrare (2013) examines utopian and dystopian themes in Albanian literature within a broader European context.

Hamiti authored monographs on national figures such as Ibrahim Rugova and Zef Pllumi, connecting literary and political missions.

== Literary works ==
=== Poetry ===
- Njeriu vdes i ri (The Man Dies Young, 1972)
- Faqe e fund (The Last Visage, 1973)
- Thikë harrimi (Knife of Oblivion, 1975)
- Trungu ilir (The Illyrian Stock, 1979)
- Leja e njohtimit 1985 (Identity Papers 1985, 1985)
- Lind një fjalë, përzgjedhje (A Word Is Born, selection, 1986)
- Kaosmos (Chaosmos, 1990)
- ABC, Albetare për fëmijë të rritur (ABC, Alphabet for Grown Children, 1994)
- Melankolia (Melancholy, 1999)
- Sympathia (2004)
- Lulet e egra (Wild Flowers, 2006)
- Litota (2007)
- Kukuta e Sokratit (Socrates' Hemlock, 2018)
- Prishtina mon amour (2025)

=== Novel ===
- Njëqind vjet vetmi (One Hundred Years of Solitude, 1976)

=== Drama ===
- Futa (1988)
- Misioni (The Mission, 1997)
- La Mission (2007), Paris, Editions l'Espace d'un instant
- Pasioni (Passion, 2023)
- Maja (The Peak, 2025)

=== Criticism, essays, and studies ===
- Variante (Variants, 1974)
- Teksti i dramatizuar (The Dramatized Text, 1978)
- Kritika letrare (Literary Criticism, 1979)
- A-ZH, Romanet e Nazmi Rrahmanit (A-Z, The Novels of Nazmi Rrahmani, 1982)
- Arti i leximit (The Art of Reading, 1983)
- Njeriu kryengritës (The Rebellious Man, 1987)
- Vetëdija letrare (Literary Consciousness, 1989)
- Faik Konica: jam unë (Faik Konica: I am, 1991)
- Tema shqiptare (Albanian Themes, 1993)
- Poeti i nemun Bilal Xhaferri (The Accursed Poet Bilal Xhaferri, 1996)
- Letra shqipe (The Albanian Letters, 1996)
- Lasgushi qindvjeçar (Lasgush Poradeci: One Hundred Years Old, 1999)
- Bioletra (Bio-Letter, 2000)
- Studime letrare (Literary Studies, 2003)
- Shkollat letrare shqipe (Albanian Literary Schools, 2004)
- Tematologjia (Thematology, 2005)
- Presidenti Ibrahim Rugova (Memento për Rugovën) (President Ibrahim Rugova: A Memento for Rugova, 2007)
- Letërsia moderne (Modern Literature), Tirana, 2009
- Albanizma (Albanianisms, 2009)
- Poetika shqipe (Albanian Poetics, 2010)
- Utopia letrare (Literary Utopia, 2013)
- Zef Pllumi (2013)
- Ndre Mjedja (2016)
- Anton Pashku (2017)
- Testamenti, studime, ese (The Testament: Studies and Essays, 2018)
- Át Gjergj Fishta (monograph), Botime Françeskane, Shkodër, 2020
- Naim Frashëri (2020)
- Enigma e poezisë (The Enigma of Poetry, 2021)
- Stilografia (Stylography, 2022)
- The Literary Canon (2025)

His literary and scholarly works were published in a ten-volume edition in 2002.

== State honors ==
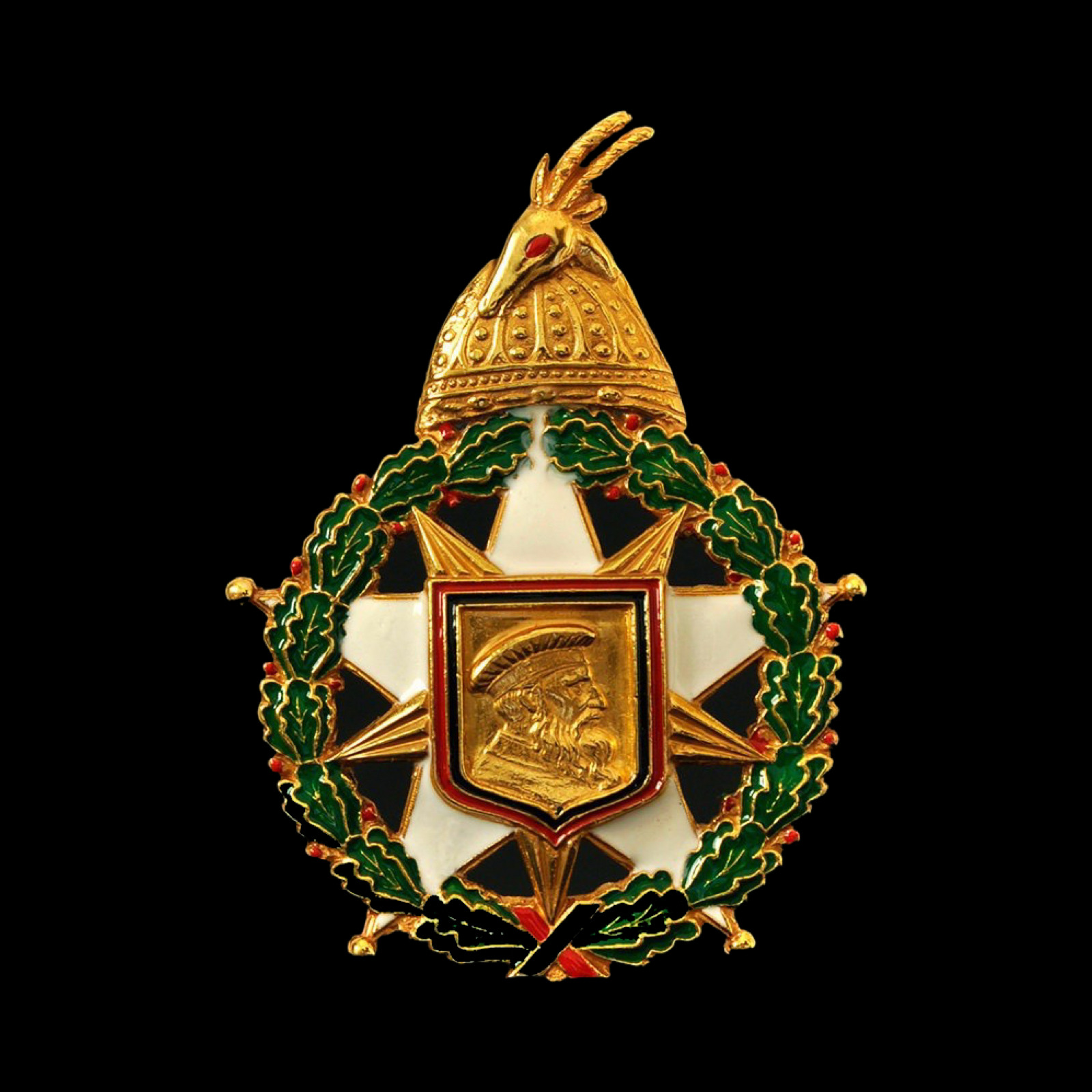
Order of "Gjergj Kastrioti Skënderbeu"

- Gold Medal of the League of Prizren
- Order of "Gjergj Kastrioti Skënderbeu", 2010
