= Haim Reitan =

Turkish diplomat (born 1946)

Dr. Haim Nissim Reitan (born May 20, 1946) is a doctor, diplomat, translator and publicist.

== Personal life ==
Reitan was born in Istanbul, Turkey, in 1946. At the age of nine, he moved to Israel with his family. He finished the college of biology in Bat-Yam. After finishing the military service, he won a studentship in Italy and since 1980 he has been an Italian citizen. Today he resides in Bergamo, Italy, where he has his own medical center.

== Medical career ==
Reitan graduated in medicine from the University of Pavia, Italy, in 1974. Later, he had the possibility to make different medical specializations in cardio-vascular apparatus diseases, phlebology, nephrology in Pavia (Italy), in New York City, Miami and Texas, and further in London, Rotterdam and Tel Aviv. Then it was time for Reitan to begin his career in the medical field. He was firstly employed as cardiology specialist at the hospital of Bergamo. Besides this, he founded his own medical studio and today it is incorporated in his medical center. Through being appointed as forensic advisor and projects co-ordinator within other European countries, he could expand his activity beyond Italian borders. During 2004, as medical adviser, Reitan played a major role in engineering projects for the construction of the new hospital of Bergamo.

== Political career ==
Reitan has been adviser to some well known political personalities such as ministers, prime ministers and presidents. He has been mostly engaged in African countries and the Balkans. He has been a collaborator of the Democratic Republic of the Congo’s Vice President, advising him on different projects. Reitan has strongly sustained democracy development in Albania, Macedonia and Kosovo, fragile new democracies which suffer a lot of social problems. He contributed to recognition of Kosovan independence from some important countries. Recently, he has intensified his diplomatic activity in Albania. He has set up good relations with Albanian Ministry of Health officials. A lot of Albanian patients have been treated in the Italian hospitals due to Reitan’s mediation skills. The Cham issue is his focus, too. This is why he passes a long time in Albania with the Cham historian Ibrahim D. Hoxha and the writer Shefki Hysa. Reitan is so in love with the Cham issue, as he expresses himself in Albanian: I am from Chameria, I’m a Cham!. One of his projects is Albanian universities twinning with Western European ones. He is paying special attention to green energy projects in the Albanian territory. Reitan is friend of Albanian political personalities, such as Sali Berisha, Bamir Topi, Sabri Godo, Fatmir Mediu, Edi Rama, Skënder Gjinushi, Ilir Meta, Tahir Muhedini and Hashim Thaçi. With this large activity, Reitan has influenced the consolidation of bilateral relations (Albania, Macedonia, Kosovo, Congo, Italy) and has gained the respect of many people in Albania, Kosovo and Macedonia.

Reitan is the honorary chairman of Diplomatic Mission Peace and Prosperity.

== Publicist career ==
Having and developing knowledge of foreign languages (Hebrew, English, Italian, Spanish, French, Turkish) has urged him to dedicate himself to the field of publicity. When Reitan began to visit Balkan countries he was interested in discovering and learning more about their customs and traditions. He decided to widen knowledge about Albanological studies and Balkanology. With his writings in different world media he is making a contribution as a translator and publicist. He is a close and systematic collaborator of The Eagle’s Wing magazine (Krahu i shqiponjës), an organ of the Cultural Association “Bilal Xhaferri” (Cultural Community of Chameria) and “Bilal Xhaferri” Publishing House

== Bibliography ==
- Ibrahim D. Hoxha, Southern-Albanian Encyclopedia 1 (A – H), 2006, Tirana, ISBN 99943-855-2-6
- Shefki Hysa, "The Diplomacy of self-denial" (Diplomacia e vetëmohimit), publicistic, Tirana, 2008, ISBN 978-9995665036
- Namik Selmani, "Salute from Chameria" publicistic, (2009), Tirana, ISBN 978-9995633288

== See also ==
- The Cultural Association Italy-Israel
- Chameria, “Krahu i shqiponjës” (Eagle’s Wing)
