= Gjekë Marinaj =

American poet (born 1965)

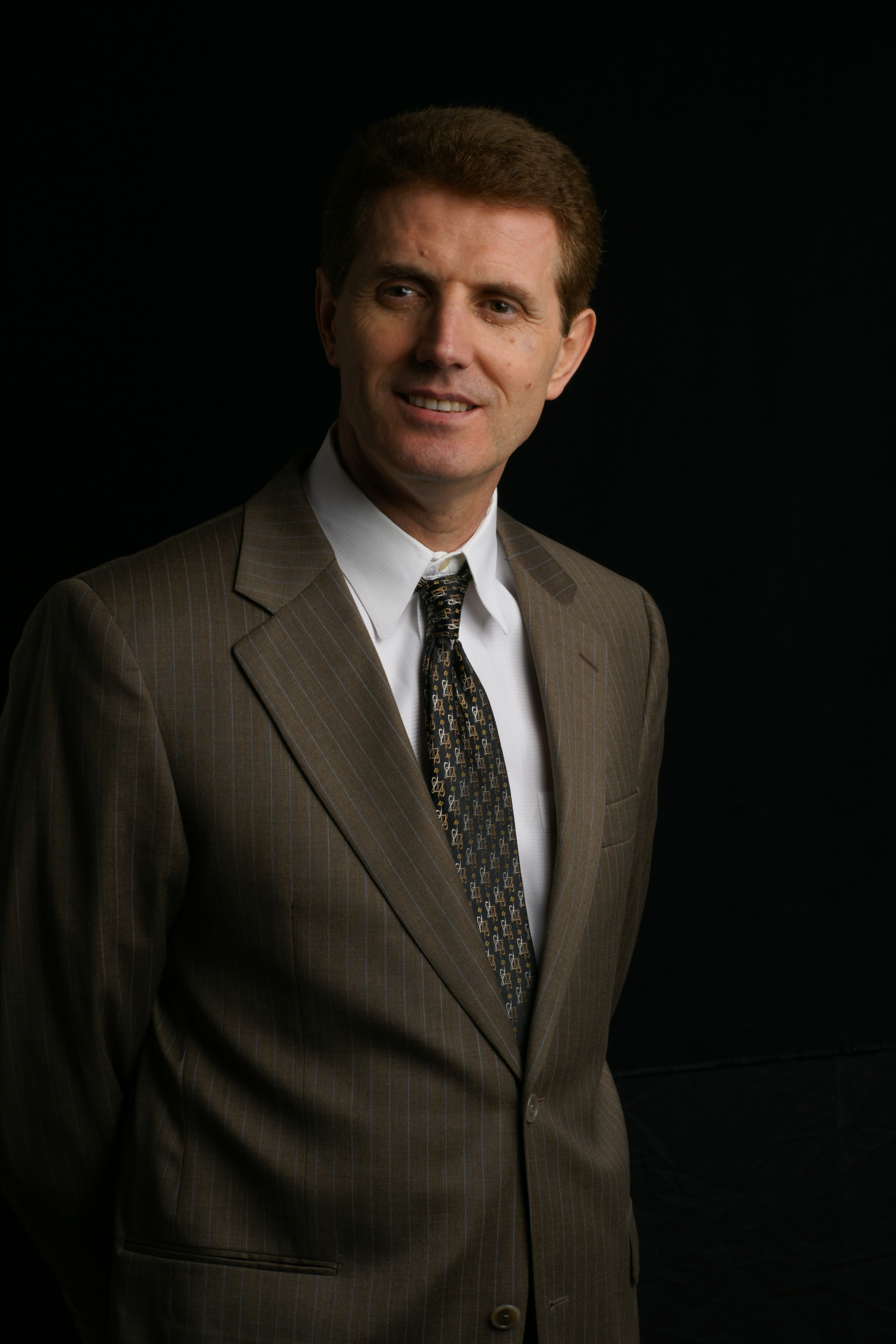
- Marinaj in 2012
- Born: May 26, 1965 (age 61); Malësi e Madhe District, Albania
- Education: Dallas College (AS); University of Texas at Dallas (BA, MA, PhD)
- Occupations: Poet; translator; writer; professor
- Spouse: Dusita Marinaj
- Writing career
- Language: English, Albanian, Serbian
- Years active: 1990–present
- Genres: Poetry, Literary Theory, Philosophy
- Notable works: Protonism Theory (2011); Teach Me How to Whisper: Horses and Other Poems (2023)
- Notable awards: Changwon K.C. International Literary Prize (2021); UNESCO's Alexander the Great Gold Medal (2023); Mihai Eminescu International Poetry Prize (2024)
- Website: marinaj.info

Signature
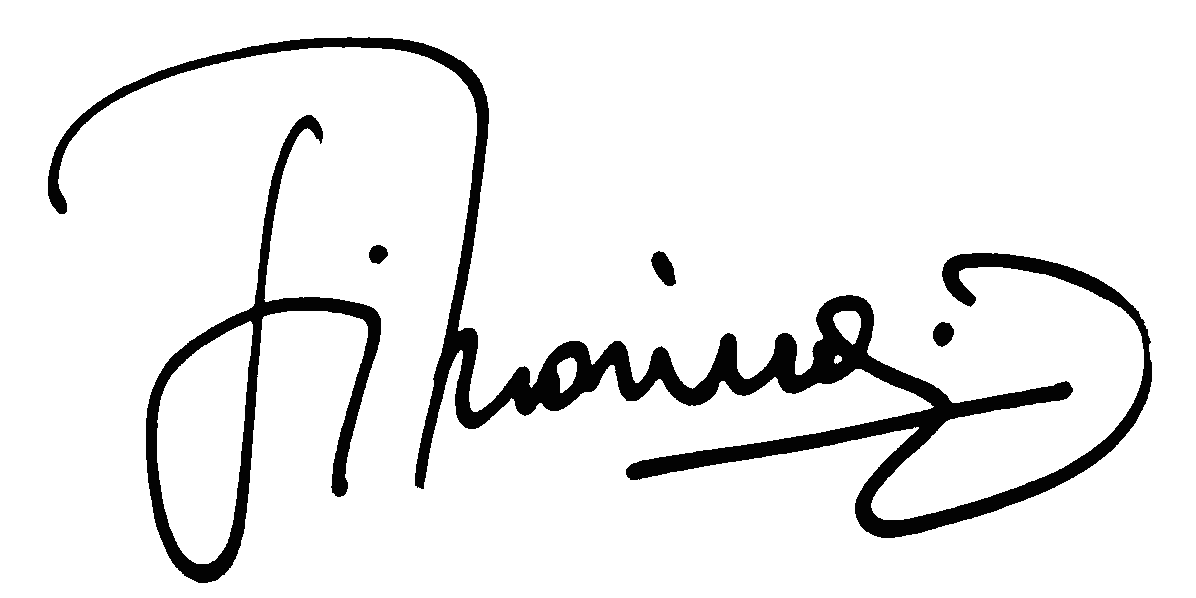

Gjekë Marinaj is an Albanian–American poet, writer, translator and literary critic who is also known as the founder of a form of arts criticism known as Protonism Theory. Currently living in the United States, he was the first president of the Society of Albanian-American Writers, established in 2001 and has published several books of poetry, prose and literary criticism. In 2008, Marinaj was awarded the Pjetër Arbnori Prize for literature by QNK, part of the Ministry of Tourism, Cultural Affairs, Youth and Sports of Albania. In 2021, he was the recipient of South Korea's Changwon KC International Literary Prize. His writing and peacemaking work have received acclaim and many other honors in Albania and elsewhere in Europe, as well as in the U.S. and Asia.

== Early life and career ==
Born in 1965 in the Malësi e Madhe District of northern Albania, Marinaj started his writing career as a restricted correspondent publishing in a number of Albanian media outlets, first in local newspapers in Shkodër, then in a series of Albanian national publications including Zëri i Rinisë (The Voice of Youth), Luftëtari (The Fighter), Vullnetari (The Volunteer), and Drita (The Light). In August 1990, Marinaj published an anti-communist satiric poem entitled "Horses" (original Albanian: Kuajt). Aware of his imminent arrest by the communist regime, on September 12, 1990, Marinaj escaped authorities by illegally crossing the Albanian-Yugoslavian border. After fleeing to Yugoslavia, he received asylum in the United States. He arrived in San Diego in July 1991, then went to Richardson, Texas. In 2001, Marinaj founded the Albanian-American Writers Association, for which he served as president until 2009. In 2019, Marinaj was appointed Nation's ambassador for his native Albania. He serves as the director for world literature publisher Mundus Artium Press.

== Interviews ==
While pursuing his new life in America, Marinaj continued working as a freelance journalist for the Albanian media; his freelance work included interviews with President George Herbert Walker Bush, the ninth and then-current president of the State of Israel Shimon Peres, and world-renowned soccer player Pelé. Marinaj's collection Ana tjetër e pasqyrës (The Other Side of the Mirror) contains many of these interviews.

== Horses ==
Marinaj initially published his poem "Horses" in the Albanian newspaper of record, Drita. What at first glance read like a simple poem about farm animals was actually a satirical social and political commentary about the Albanian people being herded and corralled by an oppressive communist regime. "Horses" appeared in Drita on August 19, 1990, and the response was immediate and overwhelming. The sheer audacity of publishing such a clearly subversive poem in a national publication amazed the Albanians (and soon after the international community as well). Within hours, copies of Drita sold out across the country, so people took to scrawling the poem on scraps of paper and passing it to one another in the subways and on the streets. Months later, protesters chanted the poem through megaphones during anti-government demonstrations. Seen from this point of view, "Marinaj's words inspired freedom [and] helped defeat communism in Albania." Nevertheless, "having seen other poets hanged in the city's center for voicing similar notions of freedom and liberty, Marinaj knew that he had to leave the country immediately; he packed a few of his favorite books, told his friends and family that he was going on vacation, and set off on an eight-hour hike over the mountains and into Yugoslavia."

== Education in America ==
After his education in Albania, Marinaj earned an associate degree in science from Dallas College Brookhaven Campus, in 2001. He continued his education at the University of Texas at Dallas, where he graduated magna cum laude in 2006 with a bachelor's in literary studies, followed by a master's degree in the same subject in 2008. Three years later, he received a certificate in Holocaust Studies from the Ackerman Center for Holocaust Studies.

=== Doctor of Philosophy ===
The University of Texas at Dallas awarded Marinaj a PhD in 2012. His dissertation, which focus on the history and philosophy of oral poetry in the Balkans and on translation theory, is titled "Oral Poetry in Albanian and Other Balkan Cultures: Translating the Labyrinths of Untranslatability."

== Honorary doctorates ==
In 2025, Gjekë Marinaj received two honorary doctorates in literature from international universities.

On 29 October 2025, Kyungnam University in South Korea awarded him an "Honorary Doctorate in Literature" (명예문학박사) in recognition of his long-standing contributions to literature, translation, and intercultural dialogue, as well as his promotion of peace and humanistic values through the arts.

On August 30, 2025, Marinaj was also conferred the title of "Doctor Honoris Causa in Literature" by the University of Political and Economic Studies “Constantin Stere” in Chișinău, Moldova, for his poetic and philosophical contributions to world literature and his efforts to advance cross-cultural understanding.

== Protonism Theory ==
According to The Dallas Morning News, Marinaj's "Protonism Theory" seeks to "promote peace and positive thinking" through literary criticism. In 2011, Marinaj's first book-length articulation of Protonism Theory, in Protonism: Theory Into Practice, received the Albanian BookerMan Prize for Literature from the National Media Group of Tirana, Albania.

Protonism Theory argues that each critic's personal interests and biases influence the degree of emphasis placed on critically assessing strong and weak points in a given work of literature. Marinaj formulated Protonism Theory in 2005 as a response to the flood of unduly negative criticism in East European academia following the collapse of communism. As an alternative form of literary criticism, Protonism aims to provide a common ground from which critics can evaluate literary works more objectively.

Protonism Theory comprises five central principles: protonismiotics, restitution, inquiry, truth and ethics. Protismiotics combines Protonism and semiotics as a means of discovering whether a negative assessment of a work represents an attack on the author or an unprofessional critique.

Protonism Theory, which forms the cornerstone of Marinaj's vision of culturally based pluralism and conflict resolution, has been incorporated into the syllabi of universities across America, Europe, Latin America, and Asia. Protonism Theory is taught as an elective subject at University "St. Cyril and Methodius" by Professor Afrim A. Redzepi. The course focuses on three topics: Text, Context, and Reception. It covers various aspects of culture, including Hegel's phenomenology of spirit, relational aesthetics, and the work of art as a cultural artifact. The course also examines the theories of John Dewey and Nicolas Rorty, as well as the application of Protonism Theory. Basic literature for the course includes Marinaj's "Protonizm Theory," John McDermott's "The Philosophy of John Dewey," and Kristen M. Walker's "Hemisphere: Visual Culture of America, Protonism."

The Ministry of Education of the People's Republic of China has made Protonism Theory a part of its graduate academic programs. Marinaj's overview of the philosophy in "Protonism Theory: An Aid For Improving the Social Function of Literature," a lecture first delivered in October 2021 at South Korea's Dankook University and initially published in Korean, has since been published and presented on in more than twenty world languages. Translations of the Protonism Theory overview and presentations on the topic have taken place against backdrops of international and civil tension, including the post-Yugoslavia Balkans, the Russia-Ukraine War, and Middle East war, including a lecture during related unrest at Harvard University.

== Literary ethnography ==
Marinaj's studies Sung Across the Shoulder: Heroic Poetry of Illyria (Mundus Artium Press, 2011; co-edited, translated and introduced with Frederick Turner) and dissertation-based Oral Poetry in Albanian and Other Balkan Cultures: Translating the Labyrinths of Untranslatability (UMI, 2012; Pro Quest, Michigan, USA 2020) draw on his personal ethnographic research. Examining oral poets and performers in their linguistic, historical, geographical, cultural, social and aesthetic contexts, both works analyze the problems of translating oral poetry and reconstruct the translation process. The books also serve as anthologies of Albanian oral poetry in English translation. Marinaj has been recognized for his contribution to Albanian linguistics, specifically for creating new words and neologisms, several of which have been included in the "Lexico-phraseological and ethnolinguistic dictionary of the Malësi e Madhe," (Fjalor leksiko – frazeologjik dhe etnoliguistik i Malësisë së Madhe).

== Cultural diplomacy ==
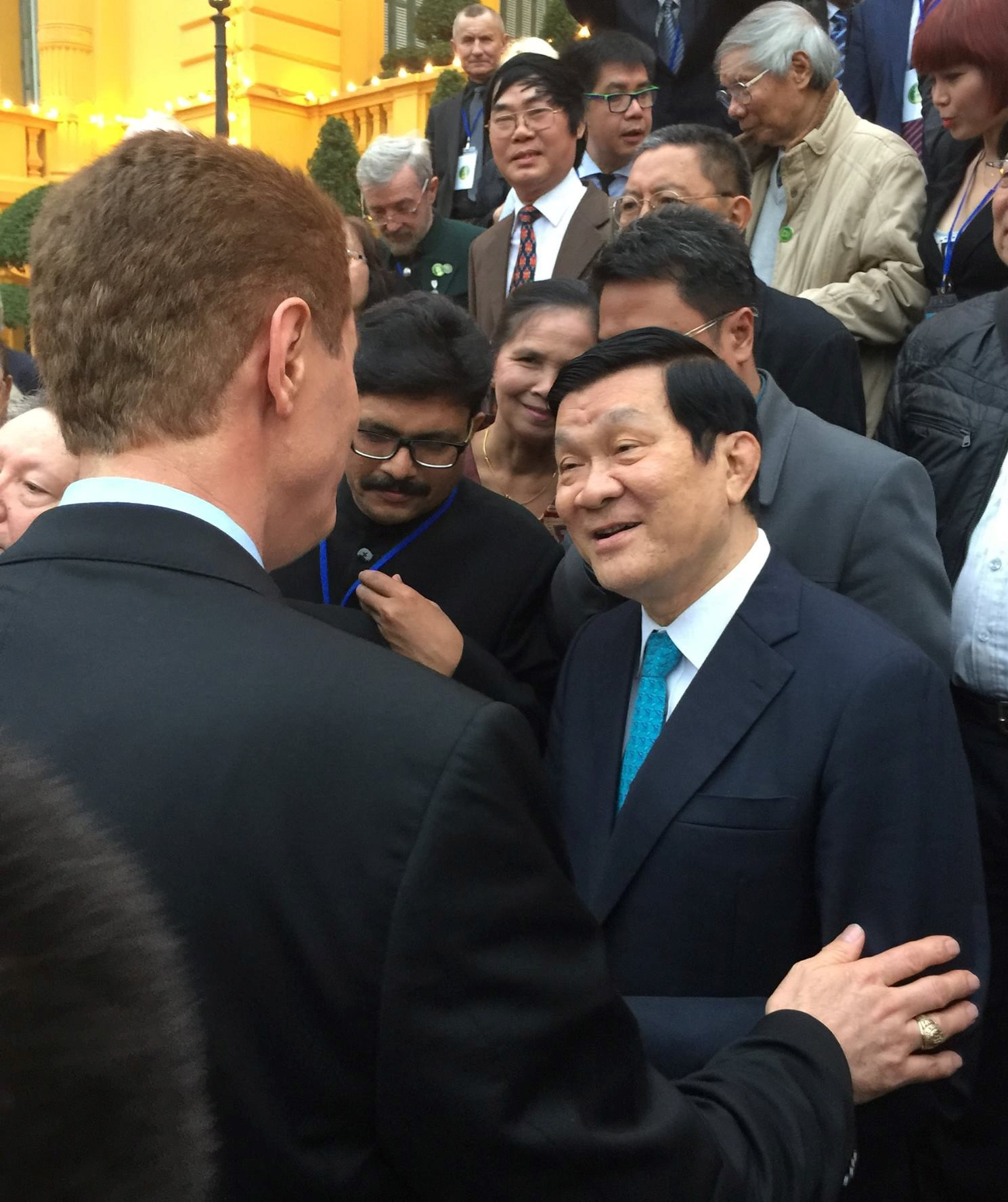
President Truong Tan Sang with Gjekë Marinaj

As of 2017, Marinaj has taken on the role of High Commissioner in the Department for Cultural and Scientific Exchanges at the International Council for Diplomacy and Justice, an organization registered with the NGO Branch of the Department of Economic and Social Affairs (DESA) at the United Nations (UN).

Marinaj also holds the title of Nation's ambassador for his native Albania. In addition to facilitating cultural ties between Albania and the United States, he has traveled extensively in support of literature and peace, with a particular emphasis on countries in the former Yugoslavia and elsewhere in Europe's historical Eastern Bloc (Serbia, Croatia, Montenegro, Kosovo, Romania), as well as nations separated from the United States by ideological divides (Vietnam, China) or characterized by tensions in shaping their national, ethnic or pluralistic identities (South Korea, India, Mexico, Ireland, Italy, United Kingdom).

Marinaj has maintained inclusive professional collaborations with writers and cultural figures from these and other countries around the world, such as China, Azerbaijan, Uzbekistan, Laos, Colombia, Russia,Cuba Montenegro, and Ethiopia. His particular global range is reflected in his publications, his translations, and the titles released by Mundus Artium Press.

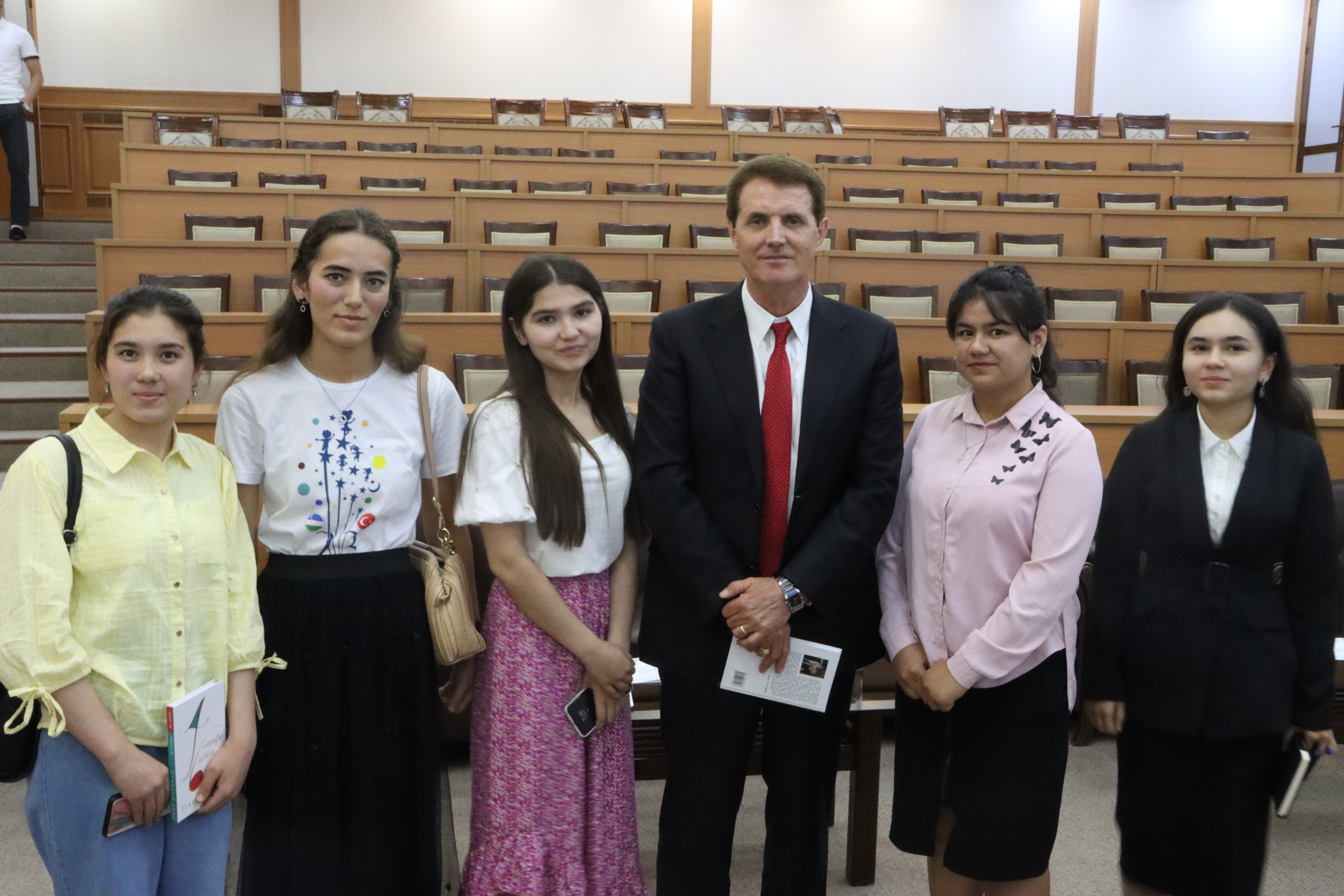
Gjekë Marinaj with students of Alisher Navo'i University of Uzbek language and literature

At the 2019 World Thinkers and Writers Peace Meet on Planetary Crisis and Human Liberation in Kolkata, India, the International Society for Intercultural Studies and Research honored Marinaj's quest for peace through literature, as well as his literary cultivation of universality and harmony.

== Current occupation ==
Marinaj is the director of Mundus Artium Press, a non-profit independent world literature publisher founded in 1967 at Ohio University. The press currently has offices in the Erik Jonsson Academic Center at the University of Texas at Dallas, as well as in Clayton, Oklahoma. He is also the Co-editor of Mundus Artium (a Journal of International Literature and the Arts). He also serves as a selection committee chair for the annual Gjenima Prize for Literature, which "recognizes the creator of an important body of literary work or a single major literary achievement that has played a part in current history," according to prize sponsor Mundus Artium Press.

He has taught English, Communications and World Literature, among other courses, at Dallas College since 2001. As a professor, Dr. Marinaj oversees doctoral dissertations for multiple universities worldwide, and is currently actively serving at the National University of Uzbekistan, Shanghai Normal University, and The National University of Colombia

== Published books ==
Marinaj has published numerous books of poetry, journalism and literary criticism in many countries and languages.The Ofi Press Magazine His poetry collections include Mos më ik larg (Do Not Depart From Me), Infinit (Infinite), and Lutje në ditën e tetë të javës (Prayer on the Eighth Day of the Week), Prizonierul Absentei (Prisoner of Absence), Dolazim da pozelenim (I Come to Leaf Out), Nhung hy Vong Trong suot (Translucent Hopes), Nhung Cay Lieu Ri Mau (Bleeding Willows), Sevginin 24 Saati(24 Hours of Love), 46 Sahifa (Page 46), Schizzi D'immaginazione (Sketches in Imagination), ການສາລະພາບຂອງທະເລ (Confessions of the Sea), Humanizing Venus, 대서양 연안에서 네루다와 함께 (With Neruda on the Atlantic Shore), An Ell Above the Clouds, The Paradigm of Paradise, Teach Me How to Whisper: Horses and Other Poems and Desert of Oblivion. In addition, he has published a book of interviews titled Ana tjetër e pasqyrës (The Other Side of the Mirror), a book of selected articles and essays titled Ca gjëra nuk mund të mbeten sekret (Some things can't be kept secret), a book of literary criticism titled Protonizmi: nga teoria në praktikë (Protonism: Theory into Practice), and a book of juxtaposed essays and poems titled Inkshed: A poet's view on the Vietnam War.

=== Translations ===
Marinaj, who has served as guest editor of the Translation Review, has translated several books from English to Albanian, and two from Albanian to English, including a collection of Albanian oral epic poetry (with Frederick Turner). Marinaj has edited more than a dozen books in both languages. He has also translated two books from Vietnamese to Albanian: Vowels in the Dew, selected poems by Mai Văn Phấn; and Ho Chi Minh's Chess Lessons: Poetry from the Prison Diary.

== Recognitions and critical reception ==
Marinaj received the Pjetër Arbnori Prize for literature from QNK, part of the Albanian Ministry of Tourism, Cultural Affairs, Youth and Sports, in 2008. Other awards he has received in post-Communist Albania and its diaspora include the Society of Albanian-American Writers' Golden Pen Award (2003); the Albanian BookerMan Prize for Literature (2011), conferred by the National Media Group of Tirana, Albania, for his Protonism: Theory Into Practice; and Malësi e Madhe's Honorary Citizen Award (2021).

Beyond Albania, Marinaj has received; in the U.S., the Sojourn Prize, now called Reunion: The Dallas Review, (first place, 2006); in China, Certificate of Honor (2024); In Montenegro, the Mojkovac Poetic Gold Medal (2024), in Greece, UNESCO's Alexander the Great and Vergina Gold Medal and Diploma (2023); in Romania, the "Mihai Eminescu" International Poetry Prize (2024, for the book Teach Me How to Whisper: Horses and Other Poems), the Bishop's Prize (2024) and the Paul Iorgovici memorial prize (2022); Serbia's Pro Poet Award (2023); South Korea's Suwon KS International Literature Prize (2020) and Changwon KC International Literary Prize(2021); two National Insignia Prizes (2015, 2019) from the Vietnam Writers' Association, with a special citation "for the cause of Vietnam's Literature and Arts"; in Italy, the International Author Prize (2019); in Uzbekistan, the Poet of the World Prize (2020); in Kazakhstan, the city of Turkestan's literary award (2022); and in India, West Bengal's World Poet Prize (2019); an International Society for Intercultural Studies and Research felicitation (2019); and a Salutation to the World Poet prize (2020) from the Underground Literature Movement and the Platform Literary Journal. In June 2024, he became a permanent member of the Academia Internazionale Leopold Sedar Senghor, based in Milan, Italy. He has received multiple nominations for the Nobel Prize in Literature.

Marinaj is the subject of scholarly works including Senada Demushi's Shtigjeve letrare të Gjekë Marinaj (The Literary Paths of Gjeke Marinaj. Tirana: Botimet Nacional, 2016), Adnan Mehmeti's Gjekë Marinaj, me shume se poet (Gjeke Marinaj, More Than a Poet. New York, London: Adriatic Press, 2007) and Dr. Ramesh Mukhopadhyaya's Hidden in the Light of Thought: 22 of Gjeke Marinaj's Poems Decoded (Oklahoma: Orpheus Texts, 2019).

Marinaj's poetry and literary theories are also examined in Shefqet Dibrani's Libra dhe mbresa (Books and Impressions. Switzerland: Albanisches Institut, 2005), Mikel Gojani's traditë dhe bashkëkohësi (Tradition and the Contemporary. Kosovo, 2007), Dr. Afrim A. Rexhepi's Aisthesis: studime nga estetika (Aesthesis: Studies in Aesthetics. Shkup, 2013), Mimoza Rexhvelaj's Vështrim mbi Poezinë e Diasporës (Overview of Diaspora Poetry. Shkodër, 2013), Anton Gojçaj's Biblioteka e hirushes (Cinderella Library. USA: Art Club, 2011), Mai Văn Phấn's Không Gian Khâc (Other Space. Hanoi, Vietnam: Writers' Association Publishing House, 2016), Besim Muhadri's Esencat e mendimit letrar (Essences of Literary Thought. New York, London: Adriatic Press, 2020) and Giovanni Romano's Poesia: L'ivincibile Presente (Poetry: The Invincible Present. Bari, Italy: SECOP Edizioni, 2020).

The Albanian writer Ismail Kadare (International Booker Prize, 2005) has called Marinaj "one of the most distinguished Albanian poets of our time" and "among Europe's best poets."

According to Italy-based Da Bitonto, Marinaj's Protonism Theory, "applied to politics, to social life, to the education of the younger generations, can create an extraordinarily beautiful and important revolution, because where there is life there is beauty, where there is beauty there is poetry, and where there is poetry there is freedom, and freedom is the engine of human positivity."
