= Shefki =

Shefki is a given name that may refer to:

- Shefki Hysa, an Albanian writer.
- Shefki Kuqi, a Finnish footballer.
