= Reitan =

Reitan may refer to:

== People ==
- Apayauq Reitan (born 1997), Norwegian dog musher
- Haim Reitan (born 1946), Turkish doctor, diplomat, translator and publicist
- Jacob Reitan, an LGBT activist from Mankato, Minnesota
- Kirsten Reitan (born 1942), Norwegian politician for the Socialist Left Party
- Kristoffer Reitan (born 1998), Norwegian professional golfer
- Lorentz Reitan (born 1946), former director of the Bergen International Festival
- Malin Reitan (born 1995), Norwegian child singer

== Other ==
- Reitan Group or Reitangruppen is a Norwegian wholesaler and retail franchiser.
