= Dritëro Agolli =

Albanian poet, writer, and politician

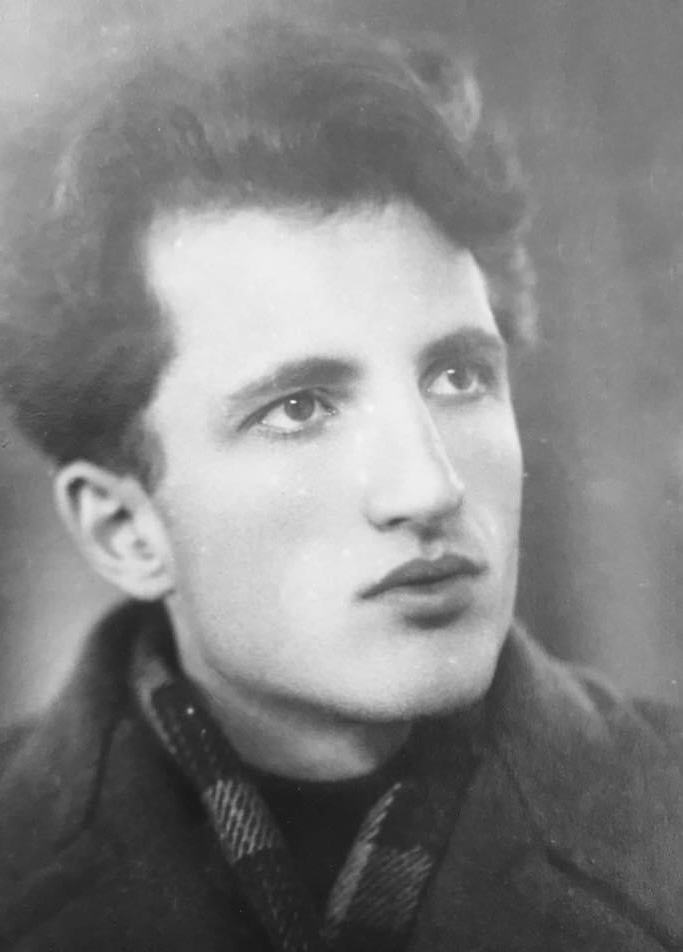
- Portrait of a young Agolli, 1951
- Born: 13 October 1931; Menkulas, Devoll, Albania
- Died: 3 February 2017 (aged 85); Tirana, Albania
- Occupations: novelist, poet
- Spouse: Sadije Agolli
- Children: Artan Agolli; Elona Agolli
- Writing career
- Period: 1958–2017
- Literary movement: Socialist realism, Postmodern literature
- Website: dritero.com

Dritëro Agolli (13 October 1931 – 3 February 2017) was an Albanian poet, writer and politician. He studied in Leningrad in the Soviet Union, and wrote primarily poetry, but also short stories, essays, plays, and novels. He was head of the League of Writers and Artists of Albania from 1973 until 1992. He was a leading figure in the Albanian Communist nomenklatura.

== Biography ==
Agolli was born to an Albanian, Bektashi family in Menkulas in the Devoll District. He and his family spoke Albanian in the Tosk dialect. He finished high school in Gjirokastër in 1952. He later studied at the Faculty of Arts of the University of Leningrad and took up journalism upon his return to Albania, working for the daily newspaper Zëri i Popullit (English: The People’s Voice) for 15 years. Agolli was also a deputy in the Albanian Parliament.

=== Beginnings as a poet ===
Agolli first was a poet. His early verse collections were I went out on the street (Albanian: Në rrugë dolla, Tirana 1958), My steps on the pavement (Albanian: Hapat e mija në asfalt, Tirana 1961), and Mountain paths and sidewalks (Albanian: Shtigje malesh dhe trotuare, Tirana 1965).

=== Prose attempts ===
As a prose writer, Agolli first wrote the novel Commissar Memo (Albanian: Komisari Memo, Tirana 1970), translated in English as The bronze bust, Tirana 1975. Agolli's second novel, The man with the cannon (Albanian: Njeriu me top, Tirana 1975) translated into English in 1983, takes up the partisan theme from a different angle.

After these two novels of partisan heroism, Agolli produced his satirical Splendour and fall of comrade Zylo (Albanian: Shkëlqimi dhe rënja e shokut Zylo, Tirana 1973). Comrade Zylo is a well-meaning but incompetent apparatchik, a director of an obscure government cultural affairs department. His pathetic vanity, his quixotic fervour, his grotesque public behaviour, his splendour and fall, are all recorded in ironic detail by his hard-working and more astute subordinate and friend Demkë who serves as a neutral observer. Comrade Zylo is a universal figure, to be found in any society or age, and critics have been quick to draw parallels ranging from Daniel Defoe and Nikolay Gogol’s Revizor to Franz Kafka and Milan Kundera's Žert. Splendour and fall of comrade Zylo first appeared in 1972 in the Tirana satirical journal Hosteni (English: The goad) and was published the following year in monograph form.

=== Albanian League of Writers and Artists ===
A couple of words, for the poets yet to come
Dritëro Agolli

For love, we never had enough time to write,
Though as lovers we loved insane.
The state wanted songs of freedom's fight;
The state wanted songs of fields of sun-ripening grain;
The state wanted we wretched scribblers
To teach courses to read and write,
To put up dams in the rivers,
To carry into the highlands socialism's light.

So do not be surprised, you poets yet unborn,
And do not judge us, for that which wasn't done;
We, next to you, will seem like hermits wild and worn,
Burdened with iron chains, and grain ripening in the sun.
We who never slept, from dusk to morning dew;
We who gave our world so many works of art:
Couldn't we have written love into just a line or two?
Couldn't we once have murmured 'oh my beloved heart'?

You want to believe that our hearts were dry?
Oh, if you'd seen how we burned among our beloved beauties!
The wonderful words we whispered, into the golden evening sky!
But we had no time to publish them, among our other duties;
And our printers had more important fish to fry.

— (trans. Wilton)

Agolli was head of the Albanian League of Writers and Artists from 1973 until 1992. He was a leading figure in the Albanian Communist nomenklatura.

From the 1960s until the Communist regime collapsed in the early 1990s, the League accused Albanian writers it deemed guilty of neglecting their responsibility as Communists to reflect the literary style of Socialist Realism in their writings and thereby advance the goals of the Communist Party; some writers were arrested, and either imprisoned for many years or shot, and others were hounded by the state secret police and suffered attacks. Kasem Trebeshina was imprisoned, Pjetër Arbnori (also called Albanian Mandela) was re-convicted in prison for his literary anti-communist work and imprisoned from ages 26 to 54, Bilal Xhaferri was expelled, exiled in communist gulags, and forced to flee to the U.S., Vilson Blloshmi was shot, and many others who were persecuted in many ways.

Some survived, such as the poet Xhevahir Spahiu and the writer Ismail Kadare, who ultimately defected to France to escape the regime and its Sigurimi secret police, and thereafter won the Prix mondial Cino Del Duca, the Herder Prize, the Man Booker International Prize, the Prince of Asturias Award, the Jerusalem Prize, the Park Kyong-ni Prize, and the Neustadt International Prize for Literature.

=== The 1990s ===
In the early 1990s, he was a member of Parliament for the Socialist Party of Albania. He also founded the Dritëro Publishing Company and published new prose and poetry.

Agolli wrote throughout the 1990s. He has verse collections: The time beggar (Albanian: Lypësi i kohës, Tirana 1995), The spirit of our forefathers (Albanian: Shpirti i gjyshërve, Tirana 1996), The strange man approaches (Albanian: Vjen njeriu i çuditshëm, Tirana 1996), Ballad for my father and myself (Albanian: Baladë për tim atë dhe për vete, Tirana 1997), Midnight notebook (Albanian: Fletorka e mesnatës, Tirana 1998), and The distant bell (Albanian: Kambana e largët, Tirana 1998). Among volumes of prose are: the short story collection Insane people (Albanian: Njerëz të krisur, Tirana 1995); The naked horseman (Albanian: Kalorësi lakuriq, Tirana 1996), and The devil's box (Albanian: Arka e djallit, Tirana 1997).

A lifelong smoker, Agolli died from pulmonary disease on 3 February 2017 in Tirana at the age of 85.

== Legacy ==
Though Agolli was a leading figure in the Albanian Communist nomenklatura, he is still widely read in Albania.

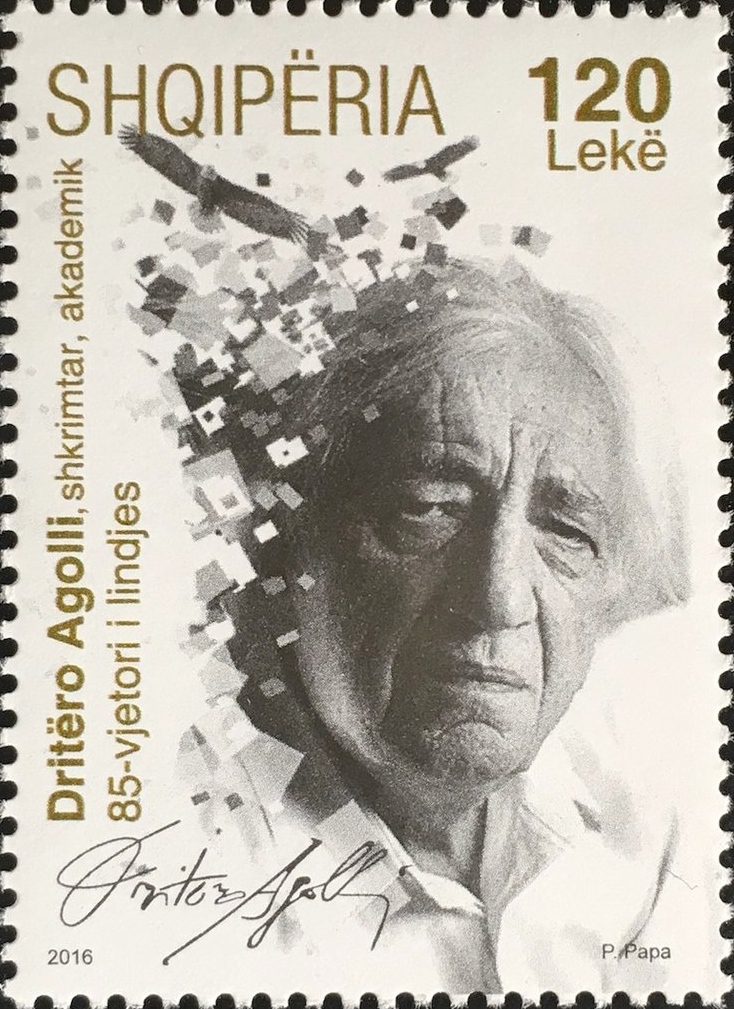
Agolli on a 2016 stamp of Albania

== Bibliography ==
- Akademia e Shkencave e Shqipërisë (2008) (in Albanian), Fjalor Enciklopedik Shqiptar (Albanian encyclopedia), Tirana, ISBN 978-99956-10-27-2
- Robert Elsie, Historical Dictionary of Albania, New Edition, 2004, ISBN 0-8108-4872-4
- Shefki Hysa, "The Diplomacy of self-denial" (Diplomacia e vetëmohimit), publicistic, Tirana, 2008, ISBN 978-99956-650-3-6
- Namik Selmani, "Salute from Chameria" publicistic, (2009), Tirana, ISBN 978-99956-33-28-8
