= Miras =

- Administrative unit
- Location within Albania
- Coordinates: 40°31′N 20°56′E
- Country: Albania
- County: Korçë
- Municipality: Devoll

Population (2011)
  - Administrative unit: 6,577
- Time zone: UTC+1 (CET)
  - Summer (DST): UTC+2 (CEST)
- Postal Code: 7007
- Area Code: (0)874

Miras is a village and a former municipality in the Korçë County, southeastern Albania. At the 2015 local government reform it became a subdivision of the municipality Devoll. The population at the 2011 census was 6,577. The municipal unit consists of the villages Miras, Vidohovë, Arrëz, Çetë, Qytezë, Sinicë, Nikolicë, Menkulas, Ponçarë, Braçanj, Koshnicë, Dobranj, Fitore, Ziçisht, Gjyres and Sul.
