= Shefki Hysa =

Albanian journalist

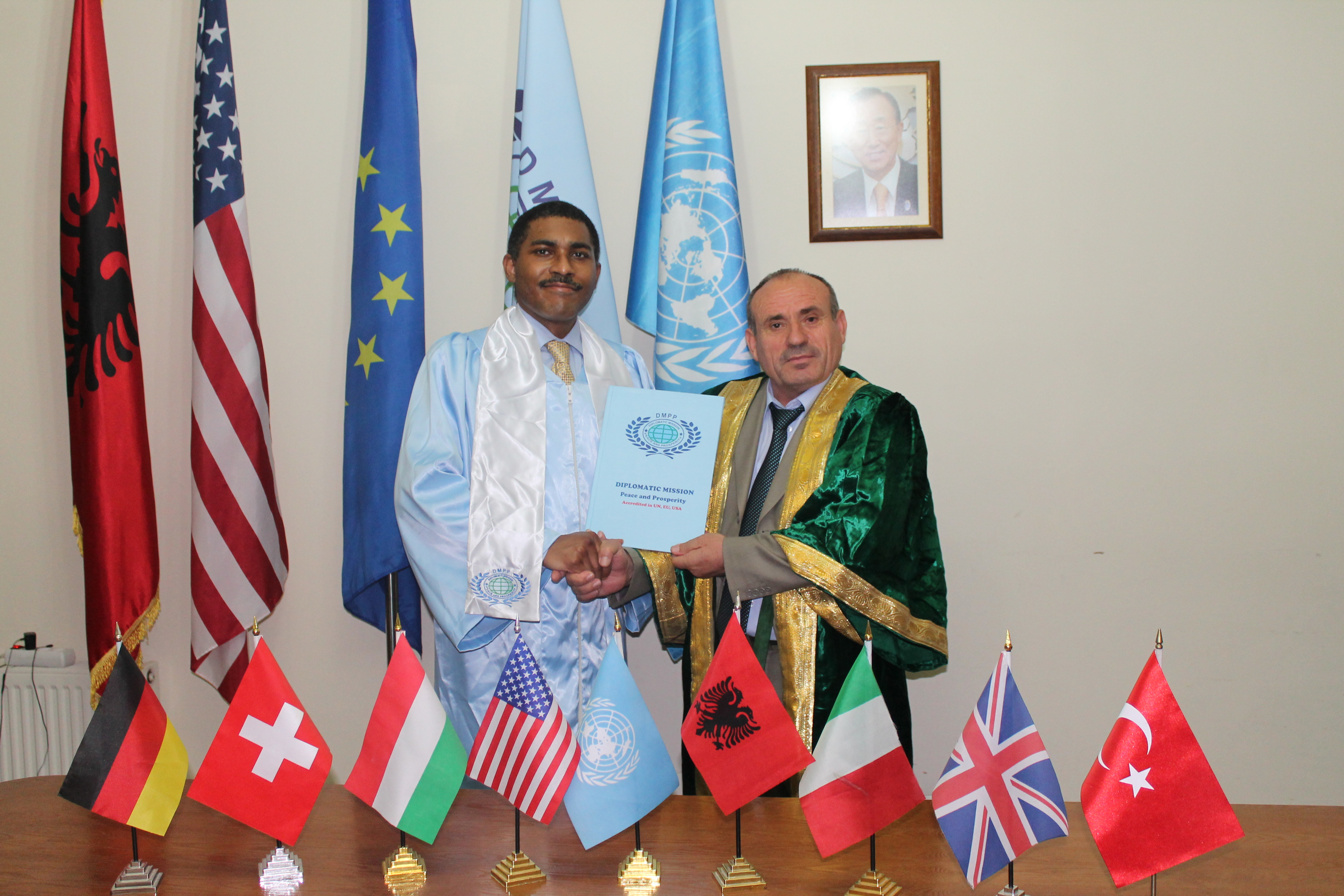

Shefki Mazar Hysa (born on 20 July 1957 to Ersekë, Kolonjë District) is an Albanian writer and journalist.

== Biography ==
He continued his elementary studies in Shalës of Konispol, Çamëri region.

In 1976, he continued his studies at high school Konispol. In 1989, Shefki Hysa graduated in language and literature at the Faculty of Literature at the University of Tirana.

Following his studies he pursued several trainings for journalism in the field of publishing and public relations and international issues.

During the years 1991–1997, Shefki Hysa has worked as a journalist for the newspaper Çameria and editor of newspapers Dielli and Kombi. He has led and continues to do so, the Cultural Association “Bilal Xhaferri” and Bilal Xhaferri Publishing House. Since 1995, he is publisher and editor of the monthly magazine “The wing of the eagle” (“Krahu i shqiponjës”).

Shefki Hysa is secretary of the Albanian League of Writers and Artists.

Since 1997, he is part of the administration of the Assembly of the Republic of Albania.

The writer Shefki Hysa is the Governor of Diplomatic Mission Peace and Prosperity.

== Works ==
- "The bird and the Devil" (1992) tales, Éditions "Bilal Xhaferri”.
- "Hostages of peace” novel (1994), Editions “Bilal Xhaferri”.
- "Paradise Maudit" novel (1997), Editions "Bilal Xhaferri”.
- "Confessions of a thief," tales (1999), Editions "Arbëria".
- "Bouquet of Çamëri", tales (2004), Editions "Bilal Xhaferri", ISBN 99927-960-1-4
- "False wonders", tales (2005) Editions "Bilal Xhaferri", ISBN 99927-960-0-6
- "The Diplomacy of self-denial" (Diplomacia e vetëmohimit), publicistic, Tirana, 2008, ISBN 978-99956-650-3-6
- Editor of the romance “La p. Respectful" (1992), by Jean-Paul Sartre.
- Editor of the romance "Fatal Love" (1992), the writer Alfred de Musset.
- Editor of the romance "Love ensanglée (Au-déla lengths)" (1992), the writer Bilal Xhaferri.
- Editor's novel "Krastakraus (Berat ceded)" (1993), the writer Bilal Xhaferri, ISBN 99943-904-5-7.
- Editor of the new "Invasion of the Vikings" (1993), the writer Pjetër Arbnori.
- Editor of the romance "The beauty and the shadow" (1994), the writer Pjetër Arbnori.
- Editor's volume of poetry "The vine of Tears" (1995), the poet Namik Mane.
- Editor of the volume of fairy tales "One night Ordinary" (2003), written by Namik Mane.
- Editor's novel "White desert" (2007), written by Jack London.
- Editor's novel "With our legs we have traveled the World" (Me putrat tona shëtitëm botën) (2007), written by Xhulia Xhekaj.
- Author of the essay “Literature sentenced to death by politics”, “The newspaper Shqip”, Sept. 10, 2007.
- Author of the essay "Literature, after death," magazine "Krahu i shqiponjës" (“The wing of the eagle”), no.81, 2007, and so on. Etc., and other works.

== Bibliography ==
- Agim Musta, Enver Memisha, “Anthology of wounds under the communist terror”, 2 (2006), Tirana, ISBN 99943-38-12-9
- Ahmet Mehmeti, “Nectar of the Albanian soul” (2007), Tirana, ISBN 978-99943-50-13-1
- Sabri Hamiti, "The cursed poet – Bilal Xhaferri" (1996), Pristina
- Hekuran Halili, "I, Man!" (2007), Saranda, ISBN 978-99943-966-6-5
- Namik Selmani, "Salute from Chameria" publicistic, (2009), Tirana, ISBN 978-99956-33-28-8

== See also ==
- Magazine “Krahu i Shqiponjës” (“Eagle’s Wing”)
- Official website of Diplomatic Mission Peace and Prosperity
- Homepage of ALWA
- Homepage of Bilal Xhaferri Publishing House
- Chameria, “Krahu i shqiponjës” (Eagle’s Wing)
