= Arrëz =

- Village
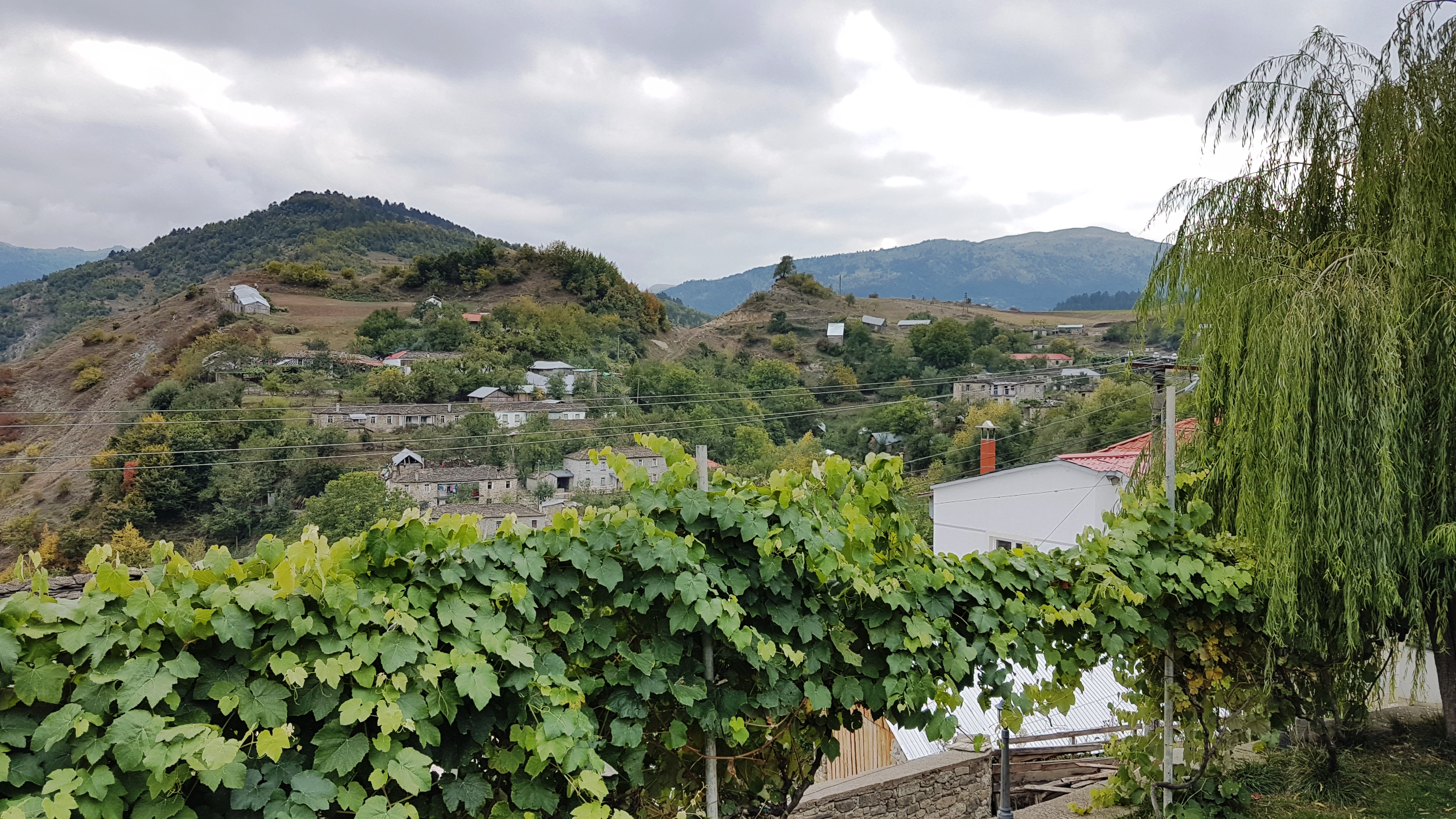

- Location within Albania
- Coordinates: 40°30′4″N 20°50′23″E
- Country: Albania
- County: Korçë
- Municipality: Devoll
- Administrative unit: Miras
- Elevation: 1,030 m (3,380 ft)

Population (2011)
  - Total: 600
- Time zone: UTC+1 (CET)
  - Summer (DST): UTC+2 (CEST)

Arrëz is a village in the Korçë County, southeastern Albania. At the 2015 local government reform it became part of the municipality Devoll.
