= Jakov Xoxa =

Albanian writer

- Jakov Xoxa
- Born: 15 April 1923; Fier, Principality of Albania
- Died: 11 November 1979 (aged 56); Budapest, Hungary
- Occupation: Writer
- Writing career
- Language: Albanian
- Notable works: The Dead River, The White Juga
- Notable awards: Honor of the Nation

Jakov Xoxa (15 April 1923 – 11 November 1979) was an Albanian author of the 20th century.

== Biography ==
Xoxa had ethnic Aromanian origins from Korçë. Xoxa was born in the town of Fier, Albania, on April 15, 1923, and died on November 11, 1979. He studied at the Qemal Stafa High School, in Tirana, Albania. Although at a relatively young age, like many other Albanian intellectuals he participated in the Anti-Fascist War. After the Liberation of the country he continued his studies in philology and began writing poetry and prose. In 1949, he published his first prose novel. Beginning in 1957 he worked as a professor in the Faculty of History and Philology at the University of Tirana, where for many years he lectured on literary theory. He died in 1979 in Budapest. He is the grandfather of Ajola Xoxa, the wife of Tirana's mayor Erion Veliaj.

== Notable works ==
- The Dead River, 1967
- The White Juga, 1967
- Flower of Salt, 1989

== See also ==
- Albanian literature
