= Menkulas =

- Village
- Location within Albania
- Coordinates: 40°32′N 20°57′E
- Country: Albania
- County: Korçë
- Municipality: Devoll
- Administrative unit: Miras
- Time zone: UTC+1 (CET)
  - Summer (DST): UTC+2 (CEST)

Menkulas is a small village of about 1,000 inhabitants in the Korçë County, Albania. In the 2015 local government reform it became part of the municipality of Devoll. The inhabitants of Menkulas are all Albanian Muslims and some adhere to the Bektashi sect. The population of Menkulas speak Albanian in the Tosk dialect.

The mainstay of the local economy is agriculture.

== Notable people ==
- Dritëro Agolli (1931–2017), an Albanian poet, writer and politician
