= Fitore =

- Village
- Location within Albania
- Coordinates: 40°33′N 20°57′E
- Country: Albania
- County: Korçë
- Municipality: Devoll
- Administrative unit: Miras
- Time zone: UTC+1 (CET)
  - Summer (DST): UTC+2 (CEST)

Fitore is a village of about 300 people in Korçë County, Albania. It is part of the former municipality Miras. At the 2015 local government reform it became part of the municipality Devoll.
