= Teach Me How to Whisper: Horses and Other Poems =

Book of Poems

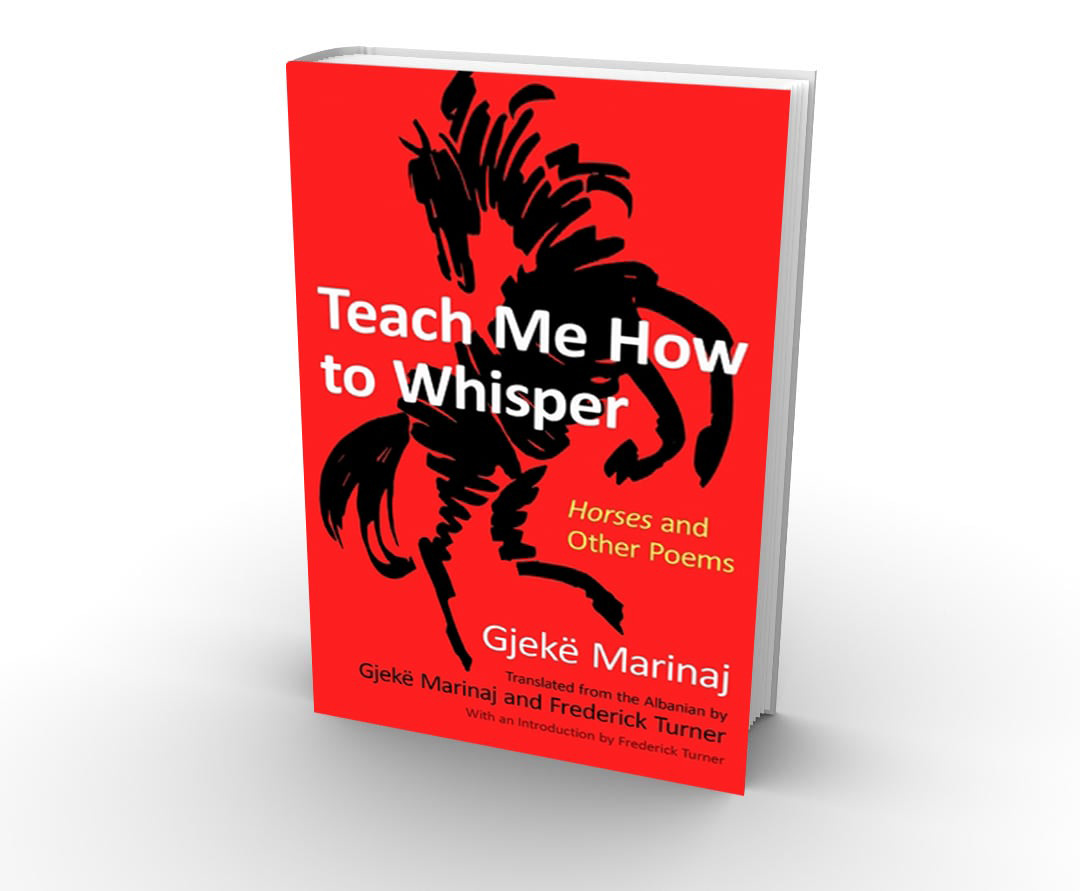
- Cover
- Author: Gjekë Marinaj
- Language: English
- Genre: Poetry
- Publisher: Syracuse University Press
- Publication date: November 15, 2023
- Media type: Print (Paperback)
- Pages: 223
- ISBN: 978-0815611639

Teach Me How to Whisper: Horses and Other Poems is a poetry collection by Albanian-born American poet Gjekë Marinaj, translated by the author and American poet Frederick Turner. The collection was published by Syracuse University Press on November 15, 2023. The collection is Marinaj's first English translated work and explore themes of home, love, existentialism, and the human experience.

== Overview ==
Teach Me How to Whisper is divided into nine sections: Home, Albania, Amor, Admonitions, Acheron, Heroines, Metaphysics, Poets, and the Earth. Each section explores different aspects of life and philosophy from Marinaj's perspectives. The translated collection explores the poet's life experiences.

== Poetic style ==
The collection's poetry features metaphors, symbolic imagery and layered, indirect language. Marinaj's work incorporates elements of ancient traditions, oral folklore, and philosophical concepts. His style utilizes hyperbole to depict imagery including both dramatic and humorous elements. His metaphors are both personal and universal, inviting readers into emotional and intellectual discovery through a tone that shifts between abstraction and intimacy, employing complex symbols that demand careful interpretation. Marinaj views poetry as a means of spiritual insight, where meaning emerges not directly, but through symbolic exploration and the unraveling of hidden connections.

World Literature Today highlights the novelty of his work, noting, "the poems' radical newness stems from reengaging with tradition." The Antlers American and Poteau Daily News describe his poetry's authenticity as "one-of-a-kind." The Statesman's review, "From exile to anthem", compares Marinaj's work to that of Rabindranath Tagore. Marinaj's love poems "stand out for their fine balance of everything that is spontaneous, tender and delightful about this precious emotion". Expansive Poetry Online states, "Marinaj is so very unlike most poets of today that perhaps a docent would be useful..." to explain "...his philosophical and moral claims and his insistence that the content of poetry is irreplaceable in today's world." Different Truths observes that through Marinaj and Turner's translations, the collection's "...poems flow seamlessly from Albanian to English, capturing the essence of their original.

== Critical reception ==
The book received acclaim from various literary critics and scholars. Wayne Miller, author of The City, Our City, describes it as "an exciting addition to Albanian literature-in-translation and, more broadly, to world poetry." Angela De Leo, DaBitanto praises it as "a beacon for all of humanity and for the young people who will write the history, including the literary history, of the near future." The review in Apraksin Blues highlights Marinaj's "worldwide reputation" and his "sensitivity to inner worlds and other worldliness." Different Truths emphasizes the book's exploration of the richness of the human experience across its nine sections. Furthermore, the prestigious Romanian literary journal “Constelatii Diamantine”, claims that Teach Me How to Whisper, “encourages readers to explore the complex relationships between our imperfect world and the inner turmoil of an ego challenged by clarity, defeats, and victories” and “Gjekë Marinaj’s poetry is a miracle.”

== Awards and recognition ==
- Romania's Mihai Eminescu International Poetry Prize
- 2024 Lyric Poetry & Poetics Book of the Year Award (by the University coalition of South Korea, 12 October 2024)

== Honorary doctorates ==
Although not specifically for this book, it is worth mentioning that in 2025, Gjekë Marinaj received two honorary doctorates in literature from international universities.

On 29 October 2025, Kyungnam University in South Korea awarded him an Honorary Doctorate in Literature (명예문학박사) in recognition of his long-standing contributions to literature, translation, and intercultural dialogue, as well as his promotion of peace and humanistic values through the arts.

On August 30, 2025, Marinaj was also conferred the title of Doctor Honoris Causa in Literature by the University of Political and Economic Studies "Constantin Stere" in Chișinău, Moldova, for his poetic and philosophical contributions to world literature and his efforts to advance cross-cultural understanding.

== Author ==
Gjekë Marinaj is a renowned poet, literary critic, translator, and scholar. Born in Albania, Marinaj's most celebrated poem, "Horses," played a significant role in the democratic movements of his homeland. He has received several international accolades, including two National Insignia Prizes from the Vietnam Writers' Association, Italy's International Author Prize, Uzbekistan's Poet of the World Prize, West Bengal's World Poet Prize, India's ISISAR Award for seeking peace through literature, and South Korea's Changwon KC International Literary Prize. Marinaj has also been nominated multiple times for the Nobel Prize in Literature.

== Publication details ==
- Publisher: Syracuse University Press
- Publication Date: November 15, 2023
- Language: English
- Paperback: 223 pages
- ISBN 978-0-8156-1163-9
- Item Weight: 2.31 pounds
- Dimensions: 5 x 0.75 x 8 inches
