= The Rise and Fall of Comrade Zylo =

1972 novel by Dritëro Agolli

- Cover of the 1999 edition of the book, published by Dritëro Publishing House
- Author: Dritëro Agolli
- Language: Albanian
- Genre: Satire, Fiction
- Publication date: 1972
- Publication place: Albania
- Pages: 464
- ISBN: 978-99927-34-09-4

The Rise and Fall of Comrade Zylo (Albanian: Shkëlqimi dhe Rënja e Shokut Zylo) is an Albanian satiric novel written by Dritëro Agolli in 1972. It is Dritëro Agolli's most famous and critically acclaimed novel. The book was written during the communist regime in Albania, a time during which freedom of speech was very limited to non-existent. The composition of the whole book is similar to that of a report, record or official biography. Originally published in the satirical magazine Hosteni ("The Goad"), it first appeared in book form in 1973.

== Plot ==
The main story revolves around the optimistic main protagonist Zylo Kamberi, who is an incompetent apparatchik. Zylo in the book is referred to as comrade Zylo, which was common during the Communist regime. His pathetic vanity, his quixotic fervour, his grotesque public behaviour, in short his rise and fall, are all recorded in ironic detail by his hard-working and more astute subordinate and friend Demkë who serves as a neutral observer. Demkë before being assigned the post as Zylo's assistant used to be a bright individualistic person who gave up on his own ideals to substitute them with the "ideals of the greater good", which in the novel is a euphemism for his superiors’ will.

== Setting ==
The events of The Rise and Fall of Comrade Zylo are set during the time of Communist Albania in the Albanian capital of Tirana.

== See also ==
- Albanian literature
- Communist Albania
