= Dumnicë e Poshtme, Podujevo =

Dumnicë e Poshtme Donja Dubnica
- Village
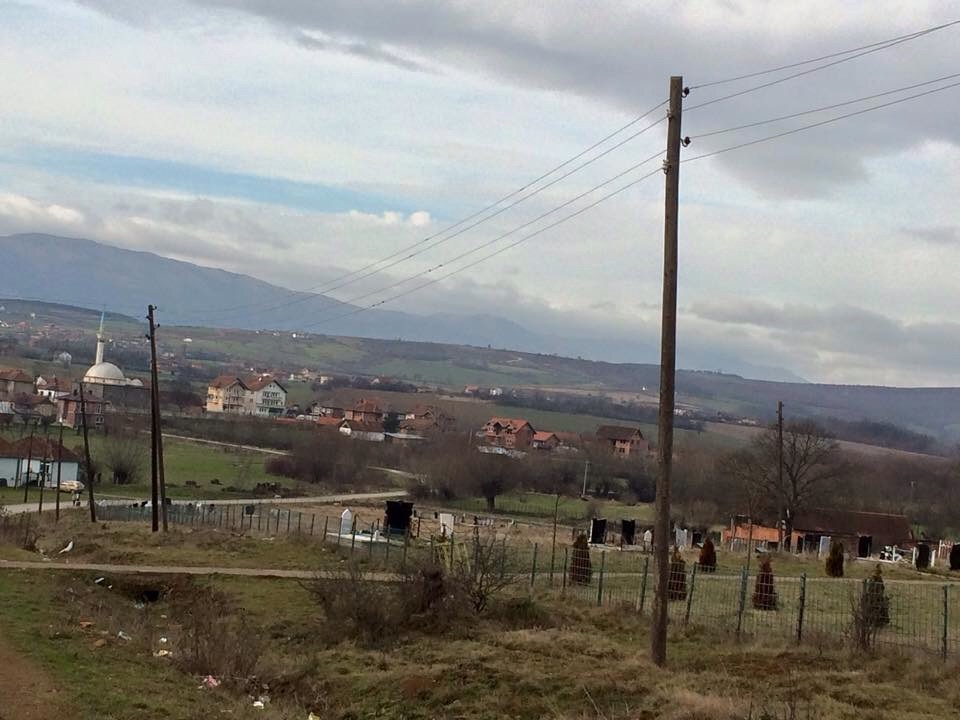

- Location in Kosovo
- Coordinates: 42°58′N 21°12′E
- Location: Kosovo
- District: Pristina
- Municipality: Podujevë

Area
  - Total: 19.78 km^{2} (7.64 sq mi)
- Elevation: 608 m (1,995 ft)

Population (2024)
  - Total: 2,526
- Time zone: UTC+1 (CET)
  - Summer (DST): UTC+2 (CEST)

Donja Dubnica (Serbian: Доња Дубница, Albanian: Dumnica e Poshtme) is a village which is located in the Municipality of Podujevo, district of Pristina of north-eastern Kosovo. It has a population of 2,526 people according to the 2024 census.

== Overview ==
According to the 1991 census, the village had 2,951 inhabitants. The rural settlement was suburban-agricultural (29,7% agrarian inhabitants), of the half-scattered type, on 620–740 m height at the valley sides of the Kopaonik by the Dubnica river, left tributary of Lab, on both sides of the Podujevo-Kuršumlija road, 5 km northeast from Podujevo. The cadastral area is 2051 hectares.

The settlement is divided into several mahala (quarters), such as Tahirova, Tiova, Šaljova, Marino brdo, Gornja, Donja, etc. In 1965 the mahalas were Čukića, Imerovića, Suljića and Taovića, named after the Albanian families, and the village was of the scattered type.

== History ==
The village is one of the medieval villages which had an Orthodox church. It was mentioned in the 1455 defter as Donja Dubnica (Доња Дубница) with 9 houses. Priest Kuzma served in the village. In the second half of the 18th century it was settled by Albanians of the Berisha fis from northern Albania. The native Serbian population was subsequently Albanianized (i.e. one of the families, the Zec, became Žjec-Zhjeqi/Zhjeci). After the Treaty of Berlin (1878), Albanian mujahirs from the Kuršumlija region settled the village (from Rača, Matarova, Vrševac, Ravni Šort, Dabinovac, Tijovac, and other villages). In 1914, Donja Dubnica and neighbouring Gornja Dubnica together had 1101 inhabitants, while in 1921, Donja Dubnica had 185 households and 1100 inhabitants. After the Balkan Wars, in 1913–14, 32 households of Serbs from Aleksandrovačka Župa, Ibarski Kolašin, Jablanica and Kosanica, and 8 households of Montenegrins settled the village. With World War I they left the village, then returned between 1921 and 1926 with 37 Serb households from Lika, Toplica, and other regions. Albanian kachaks in the village were disarmed by the Yugoslav authorities by 1924. In 1990, unidentified ethnic Albanians attacked the Serbs in the village. In 1961, 43,6% were Serb/Montenegrins; in 1981 9,3% – the village is today Albanian, as the non-Albanian population was pressured to leave during the Kosovo War, in mid-1999.

== Infrastructure ==
The village has a secondary school, a mosque, an agricultural apothecary "Dubnica" (6 workers), and other businesses.
