= The Dead River =

Novel by Jakov Xoxa

The Dead River (originally Lumi i Vdekur)
- The Dead River, 7th edition cover
- Author: Jakov Xoxa
- Language: Albanian
- Genre: Drama, Fiction
- Publication date: 1971 (written in 1964)
- Publication place: Albania

The Dead River (originally in Albanian "Lumi i Vdekur") is the title of the first novel written by the 20th century Albanian writer Jakov Xoxa. One of the best-known of Jakov Xoxa's, the literary work was written in 1964 only to be published 7 years later.

== Plot ==
The story revolves around the romantic love between the two main characters, Vita and Adil, and the ill fates of three Albanian families which all meet in a little town called Trokth in Albania. The seemingly independent stories that revolve around the three families are well interwoven with the fates of the two lovers.

== Setting ==
Like the other novels of Jakov Xoxa (notably "White Juga" |Albanian: Juga e Bardhē|), it encompasses a vast number of characters and is also imbued with the realism of pre-World War II Albania, in which the main story is set. It is one of the few works of early socialist realism in Albania which contains literary merits. As many works of that period, it used the Soviet literary model of Sholokhov's And Quiet Flows the Don.

== See also ==
- Jakov Xoxa
- Albanian literature
