= League of Writers and Artists of Albania =

Lidhja e Shkrimtarëve dhe Artistëve të Shqipërisë
- League of Writers and Artists of Albania
- Abbreviation: LSHASH
- Merged into: League of Writers (1945); League of Artists (1949)
- Formation: 1957
- Founder: Sejfulla Malëshova
- Location: Tirana, Albania
- Fields: music, painting, sculpture, literature
- Members: ~1,300
- Secretary General: Albi Lushi
- Main organ: Literatura jonë (1945); Letërsia jonë (1947); Nëntori (1954); Drita (1961); Les lettres Albanaises (1978); Bota Letrare; Revista letrare

The League of Writers and Artists of Albania (Albanian: Lidhja e Shkrimtarëve dhe Artistëve të Shqipërisë – LSHASH) is a non-profit organization founded with the goal of promoting and advancing the literary and artistic creativity of Albanian writers and artists. Its mission includes assessing and reassessing outstanding works in disciplines such as music, painting, sculpture and literature. The organization supports originality and innovation among emerging young artists while preserving Albanian cultural tradition.

== Overview ==
LSHASH is a creative organization based in Tirana, bringing together writers, composers, visual artists and critics. It came about from the merger of two separate entities: the League of Writers, founded on October 7, 1945, and the League of Artists, established in 1949. These organizations unified during the First Congress in 1957, forming what is now known as the League of Writers and Artists of Albania.

Initially, the organization had 74 members, including some of Albania’s most prominent intellectuals and cultural figures. Among its founding members were Sejfulla Malëshova, who served as the first chairman; Fan Noli, who held the title of honorary president; and notable figures such as Lasgush Poradeci, Nonda Bulka, Skënder Luarasi, Dhimitër Shuteriqi, Ali Asllani, Mitrush Kuteli, Vinçenc Prennushi, Sterjo Spasse and Et’hem Haxhiademi.

== Activities ==
=== Communist period ===
The Albanian Encyclopedic Dictionary of 1985 outlines the functions of the League as follows:

A social organization that brings together creators from various disciplines, including writers, visual artists, composers, singers, directors and actors. The League operates under the guidance of Marxist–Leninist ideology and aesthetics, adhering to the principles of the Labour Party and the teachings of comrade Enver Hoxha. Its mission is to unify all creative forces through the method of socialist realism, serving the cause of the people and the revolution. It aims to inspire and provide ideological education to creators, encourage engagement with the lives of the working masses, and foster the production of works aligned with these ideals. These goals, along with the rights and responsibilities of its members, are detailed in the League’s statute.

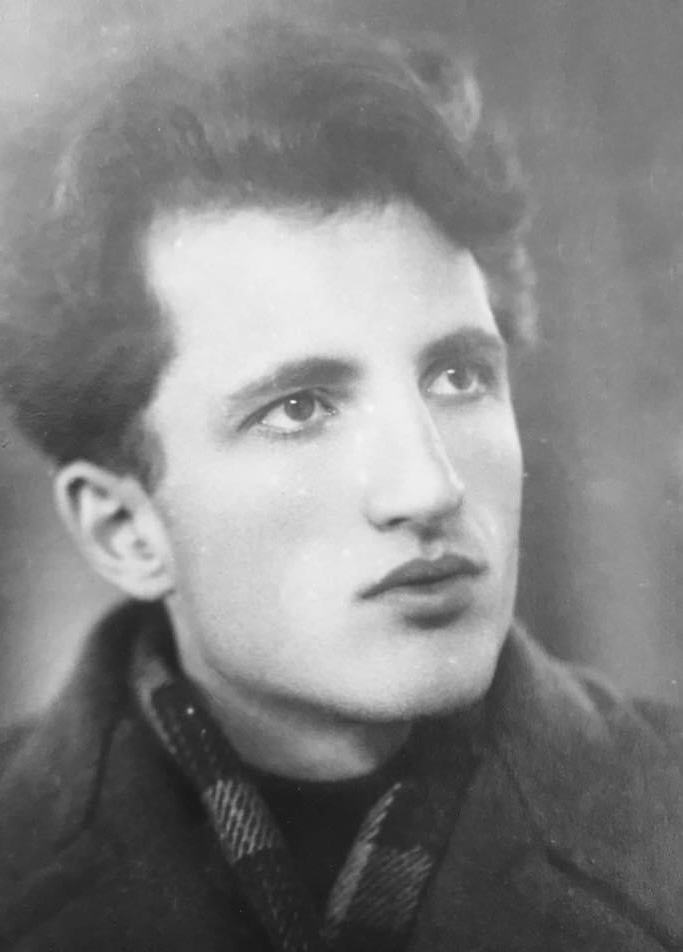
Dritëro Agolli served as the longest tenured league president from 1973 to 1992

The League’s highest governing body was the congress, which determined the direction of literary and artistic creativity. The congress was overseen by the Steering Committee, which addressed literary and artistic development during its plenary sessions. Day-to-day management was handled by the committee’s leadership. The League comprised both full members and candidate members.

Several commissions operated within the League, focusing on areas such as poetry, prose, dramaturgy, children’s literature, literary criticism, music, and visual arts. Additionally, local branches were established across the country to unite creators from various fields at the district level.

The League published its own literary journals, Drita, Nëntori and a French-language magazine titled Lettres albanaises.

== Legacy ==
In the 1960s, the League targeted writers it accused of failing to fulfill their communist duty to promote socialist realism in their works, thereby advancing the objectives of the Labour Party. Many faced severe repercussions: some were arrested, imprisoned, or even executed, while others were harassed by the state secret police and subjected to relentless persecution.

Notable dissident authors included Kasëm Trebeshina, who was imprisoned; Pjetër Arbnori, convicted for his anti-communist literary works and imprisoned for 28 years; Bilal Xhaferi, who was expelled, confined to communist labor camps, and ultimately forced to flee to the United States; and Vilson Blloshmi, who was executed. Others managed to survive the regime’s oppression, such as poet Xhevahir Spahiu and writer Ismail Kadare, who later defected to France to escape the authoritarian rule.

== Bibliography ==
- Academy of Sciences of Albania, Encyclopedic Dictionary, 2nd Edition, (2008), Tirana, ISBN 978-99956-10-28-9
- Robert Elsie, Albanian literature: a short history, I.B.Tauris, (2005), ISBN 978-1845110314.

== See also ==
- Albanian literature
- Albanian culture
