= Konispol =

- Municipality
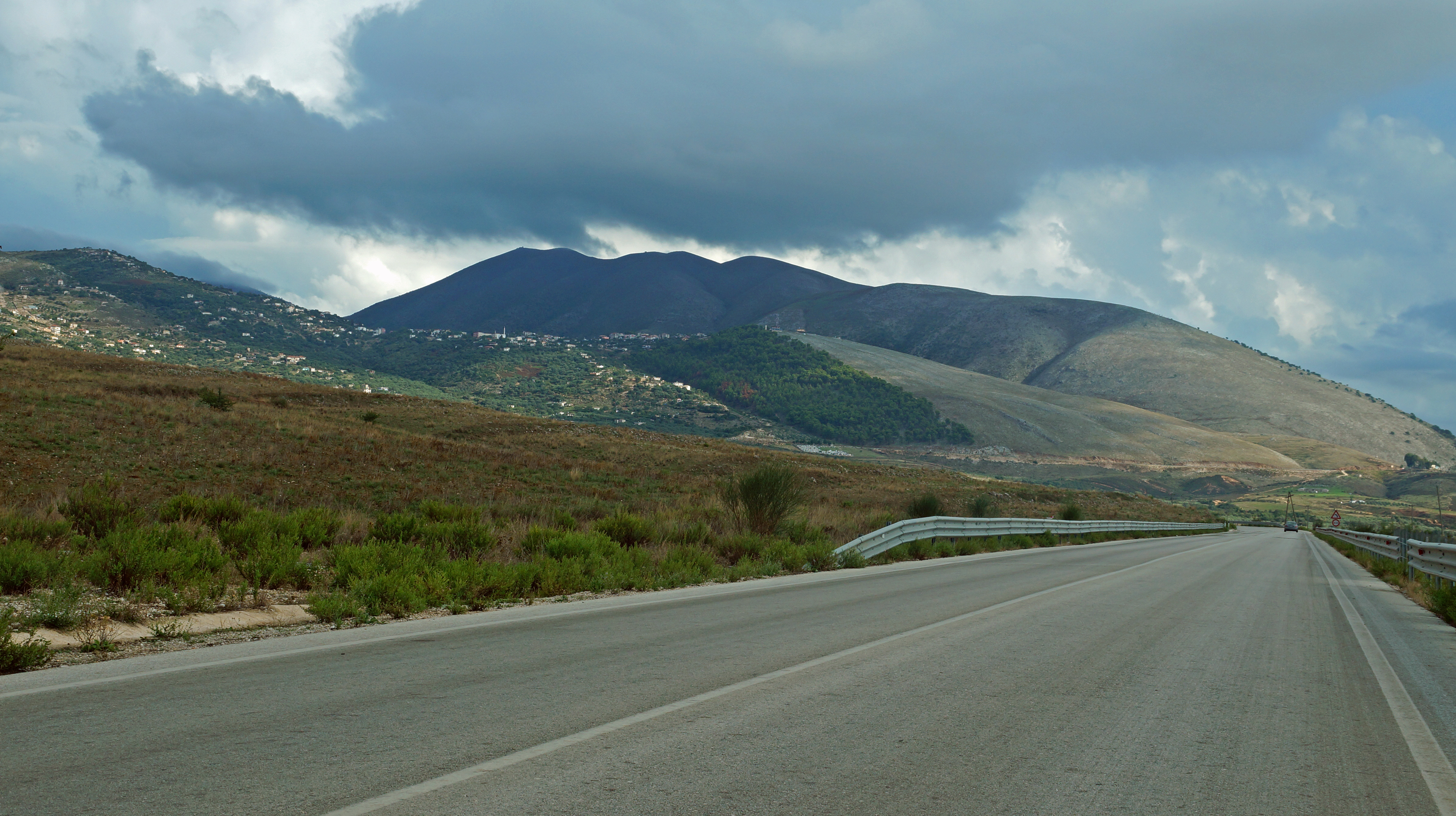

- Emblem

- Location within Albania
- Coordinates: 39°40′N 20°11′E
- Country: Albania
- County: Vlorë

Government
  - Mayor: Ergest Duli (PS)

Area
  - Municipality: 226.26 km^{2} (87.36 sq mi)
  - Administrative unit: 43.89 km^{2} (16.95 sq mi)
- Elevation: 389 m (1,276 ft)

Population (2023)
  - Municipality: 4,898
  - Municipality density: 21.65/km^{2} (56.07/sq mi)
  - Administrative unit: 1,758
  - Administrative unit density: 40.05/km^{2} (103.7/sq mi)
- Time zone: UTC+1 (CET)
  - Summer (DST): UTC+2 (CEST)
- Postal Code: 9705
- Area Code: (0)891
- Website: www.bashkiakonispol.gov.al

Konispol (Albanian definite form: Konispoli) is the southernmost town in Albania. It sits one kilometer away from the Albanian-Greek border. The settlement is inhabited by Cham Albanians. Konispol is the modern centre of the Cham Albanian community in Albania. The main economic interests of Konispol are agriculture and viticulture.

The town is the seat of the southernmost administrative unit in Albania, the Municipality of Konispol (Albanian: Bashkia Konispol). It was formed during the 2015 local government reform by the merger of the former municipalities of Konispol, Markat and Xarrë. The total population is 8,245 (2011 census), in a total area of 226.26 km^{2}. The population of the municipal unit as of the 2023 census is 1,758.

The former Konispol municipal unit (pre-2015) consisted of the town Konispol and the village Çiflik. The new larger municipality of Konispol contains settlements that are inhabited by Albanians who form the majority of the population, Aromanians, Greeks and Romani that live in the villages of Xarrë municipal unit.

== Name ==
The name of the settlement Konispol is derived from коньць, konytsy and поля, polya, Slavic words for end and field referring to the end of a field.

== History ==
Traces of human presence in Konispol can be found in the Kreçmoi Cave on the late period of the Middle Paleolithic era (40,000-30,000 years ago).

The area was part of the ancient region of Epirus and was inhabited by Chaonian Epirotes.

In 1943, Konispol was noted for being the battleground of a fierce conflict between German units, Cham collaborators from the Thesprotia province in Greece of the Nuri Dino battalion, and the communist Albanian resistance. On 8 October 8, 1943, a meeting of the Albanian and Greek communist resistance groups took place in the town. Apart from recognising that Albanian and Greek minorities existed on either side of the border, due to disagreements between the communist movements, a separate headquarters for the communist resistance units of the Greek minority in Albania was planned.

In 1992, seven caves were discovered just north of the town with findings that dated from the Upper Paleolithic age to the Iron Age.

== Modern period ==
Konispol, due to its proximity to the Albanian-Greek borders, is part of the European Union's Greece – Albania Neighbourhood Programme for improving the standard of living of the local population by promoting sustainable local development in the cross-border area between the two countries.

== Demographics ==
Historical population
Year	Pop.	±%
1989	2,676	—
2001	2,230	−16.7%
2011	2,123	−4.8%
2023	1,758	−17.2%

The municipal seat Konispol, along with the villages of Dishat, Vërvë, Shalës, Markat, Ninat, and Janjar, are populated by native Cham Albanians. The village of Xarrë is inhabited by an Orthodox Albanian majority, Muslim Albanian Chams (200) that arrived from northern Greece in the 1920s and 1940s, a combined population of Aromanians and Greeks (50) and some Romani. Mursi is inhabited by an Orthodox Albanian majority, alongside a few Muslim Albanians and Greeks. Çiflik is inhabited by Orthodox Albanians, Aromanians, Muslim Albanians and a few Greeks. Shkallë is inhabited by an Aromanian majority, alongside a few Muslim Albanians and Greeks and also contains a few families of Muslim Romani originally from Filiates, Greece who were expelled in 1944–1945. Vrinë is a new village established during the communist period and is populated by Muslim Albanians (400), Orthodox Albanians (318) and Greeks (300).

== Location ==
Konispol is:

- 293 kilometres (117 miles) from Albania's capital city Tirana (geographically and by road)
- 1 kilometre (0.6 miles) from the Albanian-Greek border (geographically)
- 4 kilometres (3 miles) from Sagiada, Greece (geographically)

== Notable people ==
- Teme Sejko (August 25, 1922 – May 31, 1961), Albanian rear admiral and commander of the Albanian navy and the naval base of Durrës
- Hasan Tahsini, astronomer, mathematician and philosopher; first rector of Istanbul University; prominent 19th century Ottoman scholar
- Osman Taka, folk music dancer
- Muhamet Kyçyku (Çami), Cham poet, also considered a poet of the Albanian National Renaissance
- Bilal Xhaferri (May 10 or November 2, 1935 – 1986), Albanian writer and political dissident against the Albanian communist regime
