= Kasëm Trebeshina =

Albanian partisan, communist prosecutor, actor and writer

- Born: 8 August 1926; Berat, Albania
- Died: 6 November 2017 (aged 91); Ankara, Turkey
- Occupation: Writer
- Writing career
- Language: Albanian
- Genres: fiction, nonfictionshort story, poetry
- Notable works: Mekami, melodi turke; Odin Mondvalsen, Stina e Stinëve etc.

Kasëm Trebeshina (8 August 1926 – 6 November 2017) was an Albanian resistance fighter, actor, translator and writer. He was member of national resistance during World War II, part of the National Liberation Movement.

== Biography ==
Kasëm Trebeshina was born in Berat, originating from Vinokash in the region of Përmet, born to Hysen Vinokashi and Hatixhe Sanxhaktari. He was born in his mother's house in the "Murad Çelebi" neighbourhood in Berat, because Vinokash was burned by the Greek andarts during the First Balkan War and the family settled in the plain of Myzeqe. He finished elementary education in his birthplace and continued high-school in Elbasan, he left school in order to join the resistance movement, due to his brother being arrested by the fascist authorities.

In 1942 he joined the National Liberation Movement during the World War II, during which he was injured badly in February 1944. He fought in the region of Myzeqe and Mallakastër, after the injury he served in Vlora. At this time Trebeshina committed two controversial murders: one without trial and one behind the back. In the last days of the resistance Trebeshina was proposed to join the Department for People's Protection (Albanian name-sake of OZNA), but he did not accept. He continued in the serving as a military officer, being banished at 8 January 1948. During the years 1945-46 he served as assistant judge of Bilbil Klosi in some political cases.

In 1945, the communist dictator Enver Hoxha gave him the rank of First Captain, next to Kadri Hazbiu, Teme Sejko and Nesti Kerenxhi. After the war, he studied at the A. N. Ostrovsky Theatre Institute in Leningrad, but did not remain long. According to Edmond Cali and Nuri Dragoj he left the Ostrovsky Institute due to political quarrels However archival sources have shown he left it due to his desire to return to the Albanian People's Army. After he wrote a letter to Enver Hoxha, he left the Party and later the League of Writers and Artists. He was firstly arrested in 1953 and condemned with three years, yet served only 11 months of his sentence. From 1955 to 1962 he did not work, and refused the jobs offered to him. Although aware that Trebeshina was not working, the communist authorities who in other instances persecuted what they referred to as "parasites", took no measures against him, nor did they pressure him to work. Due to this behavior, in 1962 the authorities finally decided to send him to internment for 5 years, a sentence which he didn't serve in full. Afterwards was interned in Vlorë, Gramsh and Shijak. Then in 1965 he returned to Tirana, where he started a job at the National Library and afterwards at the Naim Frashëri Publishing House as a reviser. He was relocated to irrigation works and since 1975 he stayed jobless according to his investigative file compiled by the Sigurimi. Trebeshina himself said during an interview that he spent 13 years in prison. Some sources claim he was imprisoned for 17 years. However, contrary to what his biographers claim, archival evidence proves that by 1981 he had been in prison for only 11 months. He had also been 2 and a half years in internment. Afterwards he was not released from prison until 1991.

Some used to view Trebeshina as one of the voices of dissent during the post-World War II era in Communist Albania, claiming that got him arrested three times and proclaimed by the regime as a madman. After the infamous 1997 riot in Albania Trebeshina fled from Albania and migrated to Istanbul, Turkey.

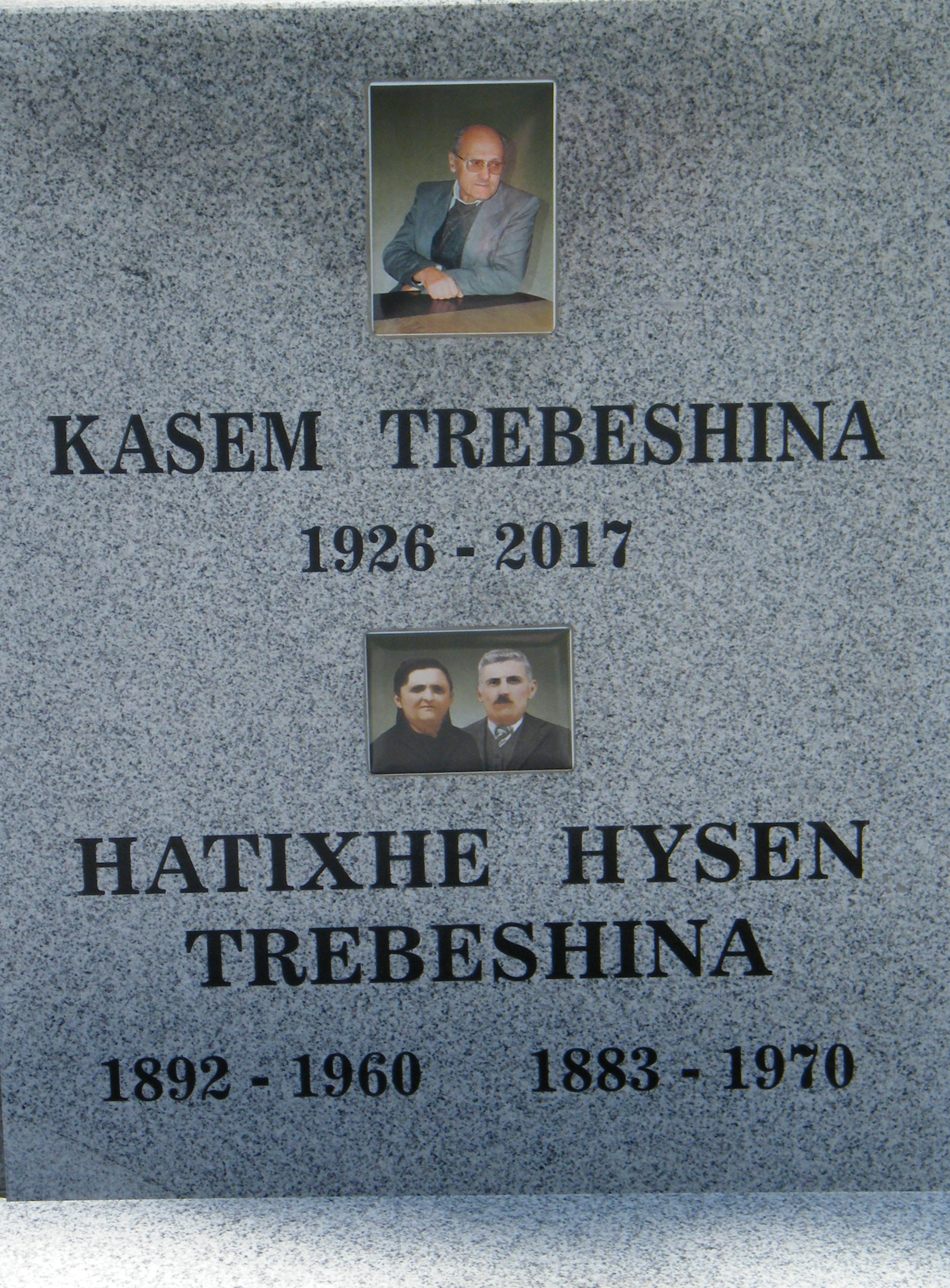
Grave of Kasem Trebeshina and his parents

== Critical response ==
Although the majority of literary works were written in accordance with socialist realism norms, one of the works that escaped these normes was Kënga Shqiptare (Albanian Song), in five volums, as well as other realist novels of Trebeshina. He wrote the novel "Mekami", in the narrative "Kukudhi", the short novel "Kisha e Shën Kristoforit: Legjenda e Kostandinit dhe e Doruntinës", the novel "Rruga e Golgotës", short novel "Odin Mondvalsen" and the short novel "Hani i Begomires". It is clearly expressed in the memuaristic essays in the volume "Dafinat e thara", in the historical novel "Këngë shqiptare" and the novel "Tregtari i skeleteve", perfect example of intertextuality.

=== Censorship and criticism ===
Two of his novels, Rinia e Kohës sonë (The Youth of our Age, 1940) and Mbarimi i një mbretërie (The End of a Kingdom, 1951) were immediately banned. When he was lastly arrested, in his investigation file the authorities labelled his literary work as "amoral".

After the fall of communism he was proclaimed a dissident based on a letter he supposedly sent to Enver Hoxha in 1953, where he supposedly criticized the method of socialist realism. However the veracity of this claim has been called into question and the letter has been called a fabrication. Albanian writer Ismail Kadare expressed indignation at the attempt of portraying a member of the secret police Sigurimi, as a dissident. According to the writer, part of the blame for spreading the myth of Trebeshina's dissidence is attributed to the albanologist Robert Elsie.

In the novel Mekami, Trebeshina portrays Albanian national hero Skanderbeg as a horse thief and ethnic Albanians as cowards who offer their wives and daughters to the Turkish warriors who are portrayed as heroic. The Turks have the author's sympathy. He glorifies their virtues and their victories. The Turk is presented as noble and peaceful in peace and brave in war against the "dirty" and "treacherous" Albanians. The book is filled with an insulting and derogatory tone towards Albanians and their history. The book has been compared to Hitler's Mein Kampf.

=== Translations ===
His novel Odin Mondvalsen was translated into German by Hans-Joachim Lanksch, published in Klagenfurt in 1994. His memoirs-essays Dafinat e thara (The dry laurels) were translated in Italian (Italian: Allori secchi) by Edmond Çali, published in Rome in 2007. Furthermore his novel Pylli - Evandri dhe Nausika (English: The forest; French: La forêt) was translated in French by Anne-Marie Autissier and published by L’Espace d’un Instant editions in 2011.

== Oeuvre ==
He was one of the first writers to write an elegy about Stalin's death. In his poem about Stalin, Trebeshina reinforces the myth of Stalin as Prometheus and father of the world, the main myths of communist propaganda, and points out with admiration that both Albanian dictator Enver Hoxha and Mehmet Shehu are crying for Stalin. Thirty years separate his last publication during the communist regime, the poetry collection Artani dhe Min'ja ose hijet e fundit të maleve (Artani and Minja or the Last Shadows of the Mountains, 1961), with the post-Communist volume of stories Stina e Stinëve (The Season of the Seasons, 1991). His first post-Communist work published came out in Pristina by the intervention of Martin Camaj. Most of his work was published after the fall of Communism, during the 1990s, which made him free to express his ideas in his works. His literary works include:

- Kruja e çliruar, 1953
- Artani dhe Min'ja, 1961
- Stina e Stinëve, 1991
- Legjenda e asaj që iku, 1992
- Qezari niset për luftë, 1993
- Koha tani, vendi këtu, 1992
- Rruga e Golgotës, 1993
- Mekami, 1994
- Lirika dhe satira, 1994
- Historia e atyre që s'janë, 1994
- Ëndrra dhe hije, 1996
- Hijet e shekujve, 1996
- Nata para apokalipsit, 1998
- Ku bie Iliria, 2000
- Kënga Shqiptare, 1-5, 2001
- Më përtej kohërave, 2004
- Drama, 2006
- Polimnia dhe Melpomena, 1-2, 2006
- Tregtari i skeleteve, 2006
- Këngë për Kosovën, 2007
- Shtigjet e shekujve, 2007
- Një ditë në natën pa fund (Dafinat e thara), 2016

== See also ==
- Albanian literature

== Sources ==
- Bejko, Sadik (2007). Disidentët e rremë. Tiranë: 55. ISBN 9789994356195.
- Dragoj, Nuri (2007). Trebeshina: Një jetë para gjyqit. Tirana: Globus-R. ISBN 9789994353453.
- Segel, Harold B. (2012). The Walls Behind the Curtain: East European Prison Literature, 1945-1990. Pittsburgh: University of Pittsburgh Press. ISBN 9780822978022.
- Shatro, Bavjola (2016). Between(s) and Beyond(s) in Contemporary Albanian Literature. Cambridge Scholars Publishing. ISBN 9781443899970.
