= Bilal Xhaferi Cultural Association =

The Bilal Xhaferi Cultural Association (Albanian: Shoqata Kulturore "Bilal Xhaferi"), otherwise called "Cultural Community of Chameria", is a non-governmental organization centered in Tirana, Albania. This association was founded by a group of journalists, writers, artists and intellectuals, friends of dissident novelist and publicist Bilal Xhaferi. Its key objective was to present Bilal’s figure to the Albanian people, to compare Albanian cultural values, especially those of Chameria, with those of the most developed countries.

== History ==
The Cultural Association "Bilal Xhaferi" was founded in 1993 and since 1994 it operates as a cultural institution. It aimed to accomplishing better the mission of Bilal Xhaferi Publishing House which opened in 1991. The large number of publications of this Publishing House and its large activity in those years stimulated the foundation of an institution with more values than a simple publishing house. The result of this intellectual collaboration was the foundation of the Cultural Association "Bilal Xhaferi", by Emrie Krosi, as a specialized institution that could expand cultural activity beyond Albania’s, with Kosovo’s and Macedonia’s borders, up to the United States of America, to coordinate the work with Cham organizations, Kosovo, Montenegro, and Republic of Macedonia Albanians organizations. The association aims to provide a great support for the Cham Issue, and the efforts of resolving this problem diplomatically.

"Eagle's wing" magazine (Albanian: Krahu i Shqiponjës), which was founded by Bilal Xhaferi in the United States of America, is the organ that continues to direct this association's activities.
On May 6, 1995, the Association in cooperation with Albanian government, made possible bringing back the remains of Bilal Xhaferi to his homeland, Saranda, Albania.

== See also ==
- Chameria
- Cham Albanians
- Chameria Issue
- Bilal Xhaferi Publishing House
- Bilal Xhaferi
