= Bilal Xhaferi =

Albanian writer and political dissident

- Born: May 10 or November 2, 1935; Ninat, Konispol, Albania
- Died: 1986 (aged 50–51); Chicago, United States
- Occupations: Writer, political dissident
- Parent: Xhaferr Hoxha (Father)
- Family: Hasan Tahsini (great-uncle), Ferik Hoxha (Grandfather), Osman Efendi Rushiti (Great Grandfather) and 3 sisters
- Awards: Honor of the Nation

Bilal Xhaferi (May 10 or November 2, 1935 – 1986), often referred to as Bilal Xhaferri, was an Albanian writer and political dissident against the Albanian communist regime. He is seen as the representative poet of the Albanian Chameria.

== Biography ==
Bilal Xhaferi was born on 10 May or 2 November 1935 in Ninat, Konispol to a Cham Albanian family. His father was Xhaferr Hoxha, nephew of Hasan Tahsini. His mother died when he was 8 years of age and when he was 10 the communist regime executed his father, at the end of World War II, due to his support and sympathy for Balli Kombëtar. He grew up with an orphan with his three sisters by his paternal grandfather, Ferik Hoxha. He finished his elementary and secondary education in his hometown and on 1948 he left towards Sarandë as a mail courier, after his grandfather was declared kulak and was expropriated by the authorities. He published his first pieces of poetry and short stories in various journals in 1962-1963. During his youth he did several random jobs while showing a passion for poetry. His first book publication were "Rrugë dhe fate", (English: Roads and fates), and "Njerëz të rinj, tokë e lashtë", (English: Young people, ancient land), published in 1963 and 1967. A novel, Krastakraus, was written in 1967 but only published posthumously in 1993.

His position would decline fast after a debate with Ismail Kadare, about the latter's novel "Dasma" (The wedding). His family biography would pop up in the eyes of the communist censorship, and since then he would be a target. In 1968 he was prohibited from further publishing, and in 1969 he escaped to Greece and a year later to the USA. In 1974 he founded the emigrant Albanian magazine Krahu i Shqiponjës (English: The Eagle's Wing), which published literary and anti-communist political material. He would be target of dubious attacks, possibly from the Sigurimi agents, and died in 1986, while being hospitalized for a surgery, allegedly from Sigurimi agents in cooperation with a local Serbian doctor.

After the end of the communist regime in Albania, he was posthumously honored by the President of the Albanian Republic with the title Martyr of Democracy in 1995, "for his dedication as publicist and dissident politician in the fight against communism and dictatorship, for his deep national and democratic aspiration". On May 6, 1995, the Albanian government, in cooperation with the Bilal Xhaferri Cultural Association, made possible to rebury him in Saranda.

== Controversy ==
According to some critics and members of the Albanian League of Writers and Artists back in the time, Xhaferi was not a real dissident, he was dedicating part of his work to glorifying the communist regime in Albania, he was the one accusing Kadare that his novel "Dasma" was denigrating the socialist reality, he escaped to Greece quite easily and therefore he was much probably a Sigurimi agent himself, and that his work is being overvalued.
Ag Apolloni, would write in an article published by "Gazeta Shqiptare" on 19 May 2013: "Dasma" was a novel that "denigrated the Albanian woman", "revisionist novel" and therefore "failed". These epithets that Xhaferi would issue with anger, would be interpreted by some scholars as dissidence. Accusing someone of "revisionism" back in the communist era would mean showing up in the eyes of the Communist Party, because the word "revisionist" in the communist doctrine would be used to label traitors....So, Bilal Xhaferi protected communism from the revisionist Kadare, and is claimed as a dissident today. This is the limit of paradox. Alternatively, one can clarify all questions regarding the "dissidence" of Bilal Xhaferi: Why, after fleeing from Albania and settled in America, didn't he become a dissident? He lived there until a year after the death of Enver Hoxha and didn't fire any dissident cracker to inform the world about what was happening in communist Albania.
Ardian Ndoca, would raise questions about his relationship with Sigurimi, and the real size of his work and contribution to Albanian literature. In his article "False expectations in literature" (Albanian: Pritmet e rreme në letërsi), published on "Drini" magazine on 04/05/2013, he would state: What was ruining a little these mythifications, was that this young Cham writer, although his father was shot in 1945 as anti-communist, had arrived so far as to take part in meetings of the League of Writers and Artists of Albania, and had even published two volumes of poetry before his escape to Greece! ...Later, a large part of the creativity of Xhaferi came out to consist of novels and stories fragments, sometimes fragments of just a few pages, however, the "fragment" that really made him famous inside the "literary" environments of Tirana, was his criticism during a session of the League, on April 1968 to the novel "Dasma" of Kadare...There are some scholars and critics today, who want to convince us that Bilal Xhaferi, whose father getting shot did not prevent him from publishing two volumes of poetry during communism, and was present in four over-controlled bodies of PPSh: "Zëri i Rinisë", "Drita", "Nëntori", and "Ylli", and did not even stop him from participating in the League's sessions, was somehow seriously ruined by the communist spirit criticism to the "Dasma" novel of Kadare!.

== Works ==
- "Rrugë dhe fate" (English: Roads and fates), (1963)
- "Njerëz të rinj, tokë e lashtë" (English: Young People, Ancient Land) – summary of stories, (1966), OCLC: 40893965
- "Lirishta e kuqe" (English: The Red Glade) - novel, (1967)
- "Dashuri e përgjakur" (English: Bloody Love) – romantic novel, (1992), OCLC: 475228763
- "Krastakraus" - novel, (1967), (Published post mortem 1993), OCLC: 35559442
- "Eja trishtim" (English: Sadness, come) - poetry, (1995)
- "Ra Berati" (English: Berat surrendered) - novel, (1995), ISBN 9994390457
- "Përtej largësive", (English: Beyond distance) – prose and articles (1996), ISBN 9789992719398

== Bibliography ==
- Uragani i meteorëve: Bilal Xhaferi dhe Ismail Kadare ballë për ballë (Hurricane of meteors: Bilal Xheferri in front of Ismail Kadare), Fatime Kulli, Skopje, 2004, ISBN 9789989222771
- Diplomacia e vetëmohimit: zhvillime të çështjes çame (The Diplomacy of self-denial: developments on the Cham issue), Shefki Hysa, Tirana, 2008, ISBN 9789995665036
- Të fala nga Çamëria (Salute from Chameria), Namik Selmani, Tirana, 2009, ISBN 9789995633288
- Disidentët e rremë (False Dissidents), Sadik Bejko, Tirana, 2007, ISBN 9789994356195

== See also ==
- Albanian literature
- Communism in Albania
- Chameria
- Bilal Xhaferri Cultural Association
