= Pjetër Arbnori =

Albanian politician (1935–2006)

- Pjetër Arbnori

31st Speaker of the Parliament of Albania
- In office 6 April 1992 – 24 July 1997
- Preceded by: Kastriot Islami
- Succeeded by: Skënder Gjinushi

Personal details
- Born: 18 January 1935 Durrës, Kingdom of Albania
- Died: 8 July 2006 (aged 71) Naples, Italy
- Party: Democratic Party
- Occupation: Politician
- Known for: Political Prisoner
- Awards: Honor of the Nation

Pjetër Filip Arbnori (18 January 1935 – 8 July 2006) was an Albanian politician and dissident of the communist regime in Albania. He was dubbed "the Mandela of the Balkans" by Albanian statesmen because of the length of his 28-year internment. He was born in Durrës, on the Adriatic coast. President Topi bestowed the Nation's Honor Order upon Pjetër Arbnori (post mortem).

== Biography ==
Arbnori was orphaned at the age of seven when his father was killed while fighting against Enver Hoxha's partisans during the civil war that underlay World War II. Although he earned a gold medal when he graduated from high school at the age of 18, this did not suffice to earn him the right to go on to college, because of his early affiliation, while still a boy, with the resistance fighters struggling against the communist regime, together with his mother and two older sisters.

After graduating, Arbnori found a job as a teacher. However, in a matter of a year, he was fired for political reasons. Once having completed his military service, young Arbnori roamed the mountains in search of a living, and started to labour in the fields as a farm hand. While holding down this job, he managed to enroll in the University of Tirana's Philology Department under fake documents. He succeeded in finishing a five-year correspondence course in half the time.

In 1960, Arbnori began to teach literature at a school in the city of Kavajë. Here he soon gathered with other intellectuals to form a Social-Democratic movement, hoping to progress toward a pluralistic society. The Sigurimi (secret police) got wind of this and arrested seven of them. After a trial that lasted two years, which entailed lengthy interrogations and torture, he was sentenced to death. This verdict was subsequently commuted to 25 years' imprisonment, because the authorities hoped that Arbnori would eventually lead them to catching other ringleaders.

In prison, Arbnori organized the inmates' protests and resistance. One of the ways he preserved his sanity was to write, at every opportunity he had. He would write in the tiniest possible lettering along the margins of the newspapers allotted to the prisoners to read. In this way, he put together a novel and many short stories, some of which have since been published.

When his jail sentence was almost complete, his jailers added ten more years to it. The detention eventually ended in 1989. He was arrested at 26 and freed at the age of 54. His first job upon being released was as an apprentice to a carpenter. It was in this last portion of his life that he married and had two children.

Still unsubdued, Arbnori soon took part in the grassroots movement that was defying the government, participating, less than five months after his release, in the anti-communist demonstration in Shkodër that overturned the statue of Stalin. With the first free ballot, Arbnori was elected to Parliament, and was later re-elected three more times. He was elected twice to the position of Chairman of the Parliament of Albania from April 6, 1992, to July 24, 1997, and is also listed among the acting Presidents of Albania, with reference to April 1992.

In 1997, his party lost the elections to the Socialist Party of Albania led by Fatos Nano. From the benches of the opposition, it soon became clear to Arbnori that there was a risk that the censorship that was customary under the old regime might be reinstated. Thus, when the state-owned television station refused to broadcast the statements and initiatives of the opposition party, he went on a hunger strike. It was here that the fame of "the Mandela of the Balkans" claimed the attention of many governments of the Western world, whose support forced the majority coalition in Parliament to review its stance and approve a formal guarantee of the independence of the press from state interference. This became known as "the Arbnori Amendment".

Arbnori died of a brain hemorrhage in Italy, in 2006. He left two orphaned children, still in their teens. The government of Albania, which had by then reverted to the Democratic Party of Albania, saluted him with an official state ceremony.

Soon after his death, the Ministry of the Tourism, Culture, Youth and Sports of Albania changed the name of Albania's main international cultural institution (International Center of Culture, formerly Enver Hoxha museum, also called Piramida) from "International Center of Culture" to “International Center of Culture Pjetër Arbnori”. And then on May 25, 2007, QNK established the “Pjetër Arbnori Prize" for Literature”. The award is given annually to an Albanian or international author in recognition of their ongoing contribution to national and world literature, essentially equivalent to the Pulitzer Prize in the United States.

== Works ==
- Nga jeta në burgjet komuniste (1992)
- Kur dynden vikingët (1993)
- Mugujt e mesjetës (1993)
- Bukuroshja me hijen (1994)
- Lettre de prison (1995)
- E bardha dhe e zeza (1995)
- E panjohura – Vdekja e Gebelsit (1996)
- Shtëpia e mbetur përgjysmë (1997)
- Vorbulla (1997)
- Brajtoni, një vetëtimë e largët (2000)
- Martiret e rinj në Shqiperi. 10300 ditë e net në burgjet komuniste (2004)

== Bibliography ==
- Akademia e Shkencave e Shqipërisë (2008) (in Albanian), Fjalor Enciklopedik Shqiptar (Albanian encyclopedia), Tirana, ISBN 978-99956-10-27-2
- Robert Elsie, Historical Dictionary of Albania, New Edition, 2004, ISBN 0-8108-4872-4
- Shefki Hysa, "The Diplomacy of self-denial" (Diplomacia e vetëmohimit), publicistic, Tirana, 2008, ISBN 978-99956-650-3-6
