= Bavan =

Bavan may refer to:

== Iran ==
- Bavan-e Olya (بوان - Bavān), Fars Province
- Bavan-e Sofla (بوان - Bavān), Fars Province
- Bavan-e Vosta (بوان - Bavān), Fars Province
- Bavan, Isfahan (بوان - Bavān)
- Bavan, Kermanshah (باوان - Bāvān)
- Bavan, Silvaneh (باوان - Bāvān), Urmia County, West Azerbaijan Province
- Bavan, Sumay-ye Beradust (باوان - Bāvān), Urmia County, West Azerbaijan Province

== Ireland ==
- Bavan, County Donegal, a townland in Kilcar, County Donegal, Ireland
