= Baban (name) =

Baban is a surname and a male given name that could originate from Turkey, or Romania, and is also the common Latinized translation from Arabic, of Kurdish or Iraqi origin.

As of 2017, it was reported to be used in Ağrı, Turkey It is also stated that it is a combination of a noun, Baba (Turkish: father), and a possessive ending -n in Turkish.

In Romanian, it forms the masculine counterpart of the term bábă (Romanian: old woman), spelled Băban, also meaning grand, or big, or descending from villages sharing its name, such as Baba, Maramureș County.

Notable people with the name are as follows:

== Surname ==
- Ahmad Mukhtar Baban (1900–1976), prime minister of Iraq
- Ali Baban, Iraqi minister
- Breda Baban (1952–2012), Serbian filmmaker and artist
- Cihad Baban (1911–1984), Turkish journalist and parliamentary deputy
- Gracián Babán (1620–1675), Spanish composer
- Jamal Baban (1893–1965), Iraqi lawyer and politician
- Jean-Pierre Mbereke-Baban (born 1959), Cameroonian boxer
- József Babán (born 1935), Hungarian ice hockey player
- Marcel Băban (born 1968), Romanian football player
- Marian Băban (born 1976), Romanian sprint canoeist
- Serwan Baban (born 1958), Kurdish professor and minister
- Taha Baban, Kurdish writer and artist

== Given name ==
- Baban Daware (born 1931), Indian wrestler
- Baban Singh, Nepali politician

== See also ==
- Baban (disambiguation)
