= Urbán de Vargas =

Spanish composer

Urbán de Vargas (1606–1656) was a Spanish baroque composer.

== Life ==
Urbano Barguilla y de Ripalda was born in 1606 in Falces, south of Navarra. He studied with the maestro de capilla at Burgos, Luis Bernardo Jalón, known for his polemic activities and radical views on music. As was common among the chapel masters of the period, Vargas passed the cathedrals of Huesca, Pamplona, Daroca, Calatayud, the Basilica of Our Lady of the Pillar in Zaragoza, and finally the Valencia, where he died at the age of 50.

Vargas' music is in a complex polyphonic early baroque idiom. In his life he was highly regarded both as composer and organist working with other important Iberian musicians of the period including Juan Bautista Comes, Carlos Patiño (1600–1675), and the Portuguese monk Manuel Correia, maestro de capilla in Zaragoza's other cathedral La Seo. Among his pupils were Miguel Juan Marqués, Lluís Vicenç Gargallo and Juan Bautista Cabanilles.

== Works ==
Surviving works include:

- Misa de la Batalla
- villancicos
