= Baban (disambiguation) =

Baban was a Kurdish principality (1649–1850) in present-day Iraqi Kurdistan.

Baban may also refer to:

- Baban (film)
- Baban (name), list of people with the name
- Baban, Iran, a village in Iran
- Baban, Albania, a village in Albania
- Baban-e Sardar Qasemkhan, a Village in Iran
