= Antoni Massana =

Spanish Jesuit priest and composer

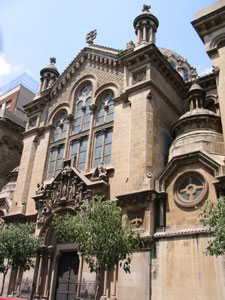
Col·legi Casp, church Sagrat Cor de Jesús

Antoni Massana i Bertran (24 February 1890 in Barcelona – 9 September 1966 in Raïmat) was a Spanish Jesuit priest and composer. He was maestro de capilla at the Church of the Jesuits, Sagrat Cor de Jesús, at the Col·legi Casp, Barcelona.

The scores of Antoni Massana are preserved in the Biblioteca de Catalunya.

== Works, editions and recordings ==
Works

- Canigó – opera. (1934), in three acts to a libretto by Josep Carner based on the work of Jacint Verdaguer. Concert performance 1936. 1953 staged premiere at the Gran Teatre del Liceu, and recording.

Recordings

- En l'enterro d'un nin. Resignació. on Jacint Verdaguer i el lied català. M. Teresa Garrigosa, soprano; Emili Blasco, piano La mà de Guido, 2005.

== Bibliography ==
- Colomer, Consuelo. Antonio Massana y Beltrán (1890–1966) : I Centenario de su nacimiento : Ensayo biográfico. València: Albatros, 1989. ISBN 8472741699 (in Spanish)
- Crespí, Joana. Catàleg del fons Antoni Massana a la Biblioteca de Catalunya. Barcelona: Biblioteca de Catalunya, 1992. ISBN 84-7845-110-2 (in Catalan)
