= Juan Bautista Comes =

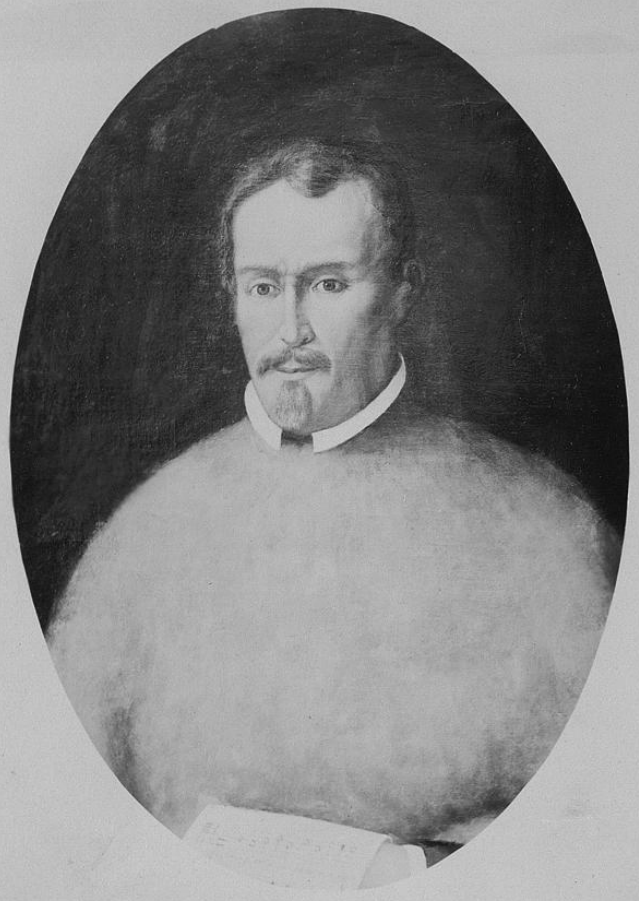
The portrait of Juan Bautista Comes

Juan Bautista Comes (ca. 1582 – 5 January 1643), a.k.a. per Valencian spelling Joan Baptista Comes, was a Spanish Baroque composer who was born and died in Valencia.

It is known that before 1613 he held posts as Maestro de Capilla in Lleida at its cathedral and in Valencia at the Colegio del Patriarca. Also in Valencia, at its cathedral, from 1613 to 1619, he held a post as Maestro de Capilla. From 1619 to 1629 he was Second Maestro in Madrid at the Habsburg court, during the period when Felipe III and Felipe IV governed. Nevertheless, he returned to his old post at Valencia Cathedral in 1632, which he held until his death.

He studied under Juan Ginés Pérez.

In the field of composition he is best known for his villancicos such as Terremoto, que ruido and for his Christian sacred polychoral works. His villancicos make use of Spanish, Portuguese and Galician texts.

Magnificat 8 tono (fragment)
Retrobem la nostra música

== Recordings ==
- Missa de Batalla. Victoria Musicae Josep R. Gil-Tàrrega: La Mà de Guido 2006
- In nativitate Domini. Victoria Musicae Josep R. Gil-Tàrrega: La Mà de Guido 2005
- Danzas del Corpus Christi. Juan Bautista Comes (ca. 1582-1643) Capella Saetabis. Rodrigo Madrid: SEdeM CD 17. 2006
- In festis Corporis Christi. Victoria Musicae Josep R. Gil-Tàrrega: La Mà de Guido 2010
- Villancico al Santísimo: A la sombra estáis (6:30) on A batallar estrellas. Banzo. Harmonia Mundi.
- Para regalo y bien mío. Retrobem la nostra música, CD nº 21.
- Que el Rey del cielo este al hielo. Retrobem la nostra música, CD nº 21.
- Magnificat 8º tono, a 4 v mixtes, Dialogado con el gregoriano. Retrobem la nostra música, CD nº 21.
