= Francesc Morera i Cots =

Valencian composer (1731–1793)

El misterio de la Fe (fragment)
Espais de Llum Musical

Francesc Morera i Cots (Sant Mateu, 4 April 1731 – Valencia, 17 October 1793), was a Valencian composer in the baroque style.

He was a Chapel Cathedral choirboy in Valencia since he was 10 years old. His first known professional employment was as organist at Patriarca's Chapel in Valencia since 1753, a post which he held in property at 1755. He confessed to be a Josep Pradas disciple and he tried to get his position as Chapel master in the cathedral of Valencia when Pradas died, but was unsuccessful. He occupied different positions in Castelló and Cuenca, and finally he obtained the Chapel master position in Cathedral of Valencia in 1768.

== Media ==
- Villancico al Santísimo: A la promisión sagrada. Espais de Llum Musical, 1 CD. (2008)
- Cuatro al Santísimo: Ah de la corte divina. Espais de Llum Musical, 1 CD. (2008)
- Cuatro al Santísimo: El misterio de la Fe. Espais de Llum Musical, 1 CD. (2008)
- Como el Rey Supremo anhela: Villancico – cantata a 8 voces con violines, oboes, trompas, órgano y continuo, edición de Rodrigo Madrid Gómez, Conservatori Superior de Música de Castelló. Castellón, 2010. Quadern 30, 2010.

== Biography ==
- Bernat Adam Ferrero Músicos Valencianos. Ed. Proip. València, 1988.
- José Luis Palacios Garoz Nuevos datos sobre la vida y muerte de Francisco Morera i Cots (1731–1793), Maestro de Capilla de la Catedral de Valencia, published at NASARRE Núm. XVII (1–2). pp. 357–371. 2001 Nacional.
