= Paolo da San Leocadio =

Italian painter

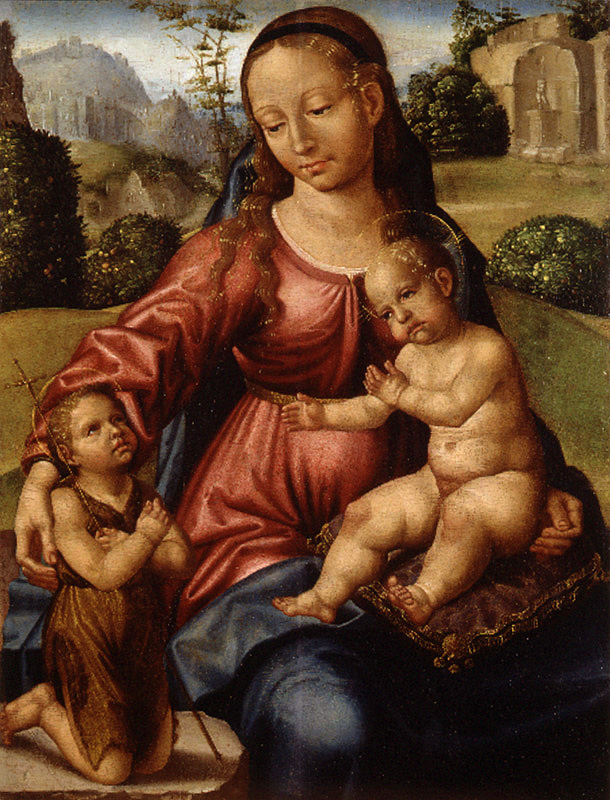
Madonna with child and John the Baptist, painting now in the Museu de Belles Arts de València, c.1510

Pablo da San Leocadio or Paolo da Reggio (10 September 1447 – c. 1520) was an Italian painter from Reggio Emilia, who was mostly active in Spain.

== Biography ==
In the 1450s or 1460 he moved to Ferrara, where he was influenced by local painters such as Bono da Ferrara and Ercole de' Roberti. In 1472 he sailed from Ostia to Valencia, for Cardinal Rodrigo Borgia, the future Pope Alexander VI.

He painted, in 1506, in conjunction with Francesco Pagano, the doors of the high altar of the cathedral of Valencia, with subjects from the Life of the Virgin. His other works include a Virgin of the Grace in the church of San Miguel at Enguera (province of Valencia), a St. Michael in the Diocesan Museum of Valencia, the Virgin of the Knight of Montesa in the Museo del Prado of Madrid and the Holy Conversation in the National Gallery, London.

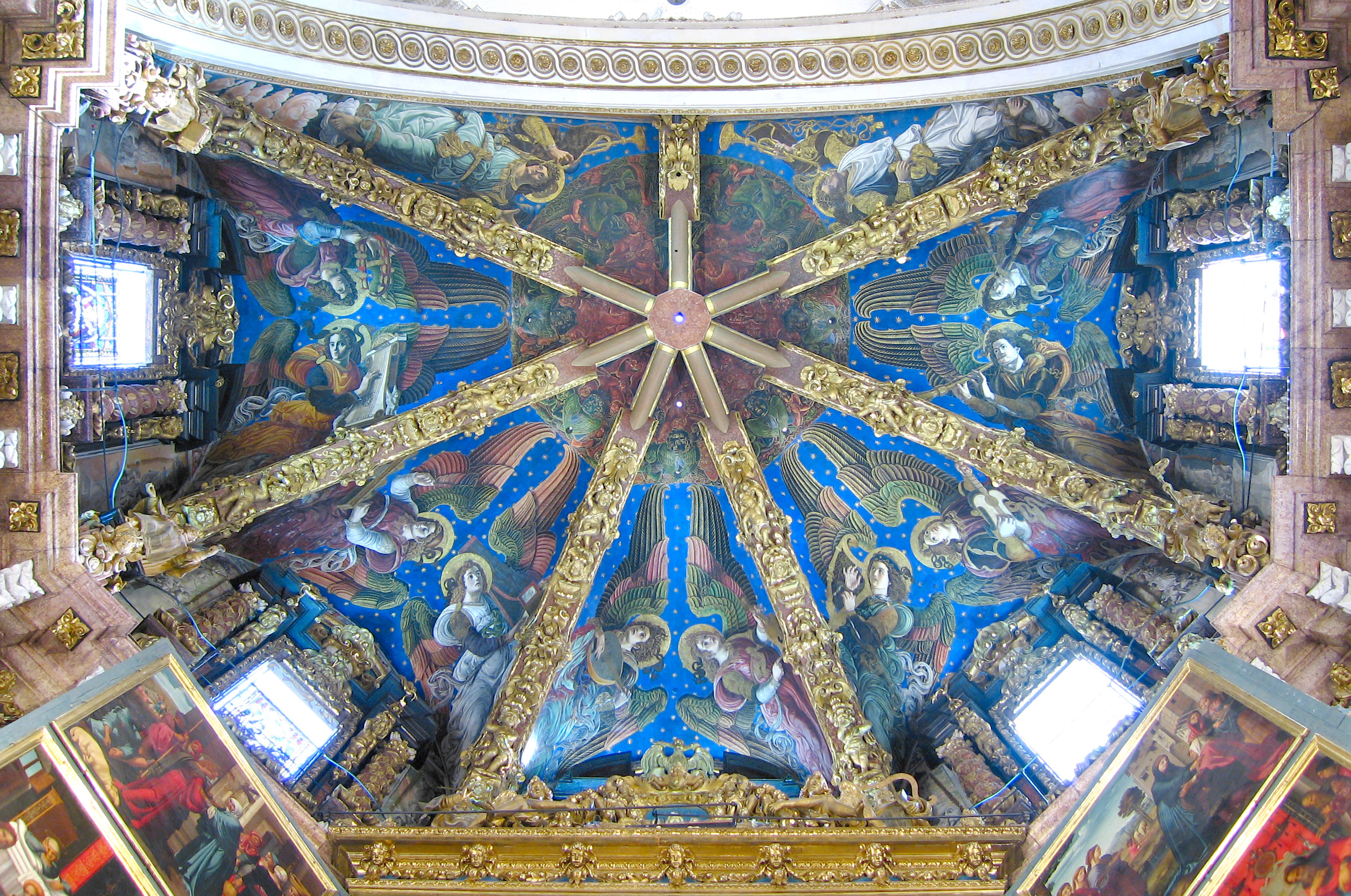
Angels playing music by Leocadio da San Paolo and Francesco Pagano, ceiling painting above the altar in the Cathedral of Valencia, 1474

== See also ==
- Route of the Borgias
