= Ambrosio Cotes =

Spanish Renaissance composer (died 1603)

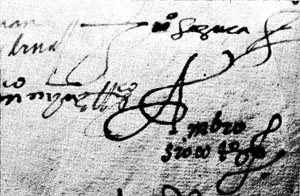
Signature of Ambrosio Cotes in 1576.

Ambrosio (Coronado de) Cotes (c. 1550–1603) was a Spanish Renaissance composer.

Cotes was born in Villena, Alicante around 1550 of noble birth. He studied theology with the Theatines of Yecla. In 1573 he was maestro de capilla at the church of St. James Church in his hometown. In 1581 he was appointed maestro de capilla of the Royal Chapel of Granada, in the place of Rodrigo de Ceballos. In 1596 he was maestrescuela in Cathedral of Valencia, until 1600 when he succeeded Guerrero at the Cathedral of Seville. His works were copied and carried to the New World. He died in Seville in 1603.

== Extant works and editions ==
Like many other Spanish composers of the period, his secular villancicos and canzonetas have been lost. Of the sacred works 25 polyphonic compositions are preserved in Granada, a mass in the Cathedral of Valencia, and a further 3 motets in the Colegio del Patriarca. Four separate pieces without words have been published by López Calo, who believes they are the only instrumental works for church to survive from the sixteenth century.

- Lamentations (3 sets)
- Officium Defunctorum
- Mass
- Mortus est Phillipus Rex, a 7 voces
- Non in solo pane vivit homo, a 4 voces
- Visionem quam vidistis, a 4 voces
- Veni, sponsor Christi, a 4 voces
- Quomodo sedet sola, a 5 voces
- Cogitavit Dominus, a 4 voces.
- Prudentes virgines, a 4 (wedding motet 1599)
- O lux et decus Hispaniae a 6

== Discography ==
- Opera Varia. Gil-Tarrega, Victoria Musicae Label: La Ma De Guido – LMG 2053.
