= Psalm 142 =

142nd psalm of the book of psalms

- "I cried unto the LORD with my voice"
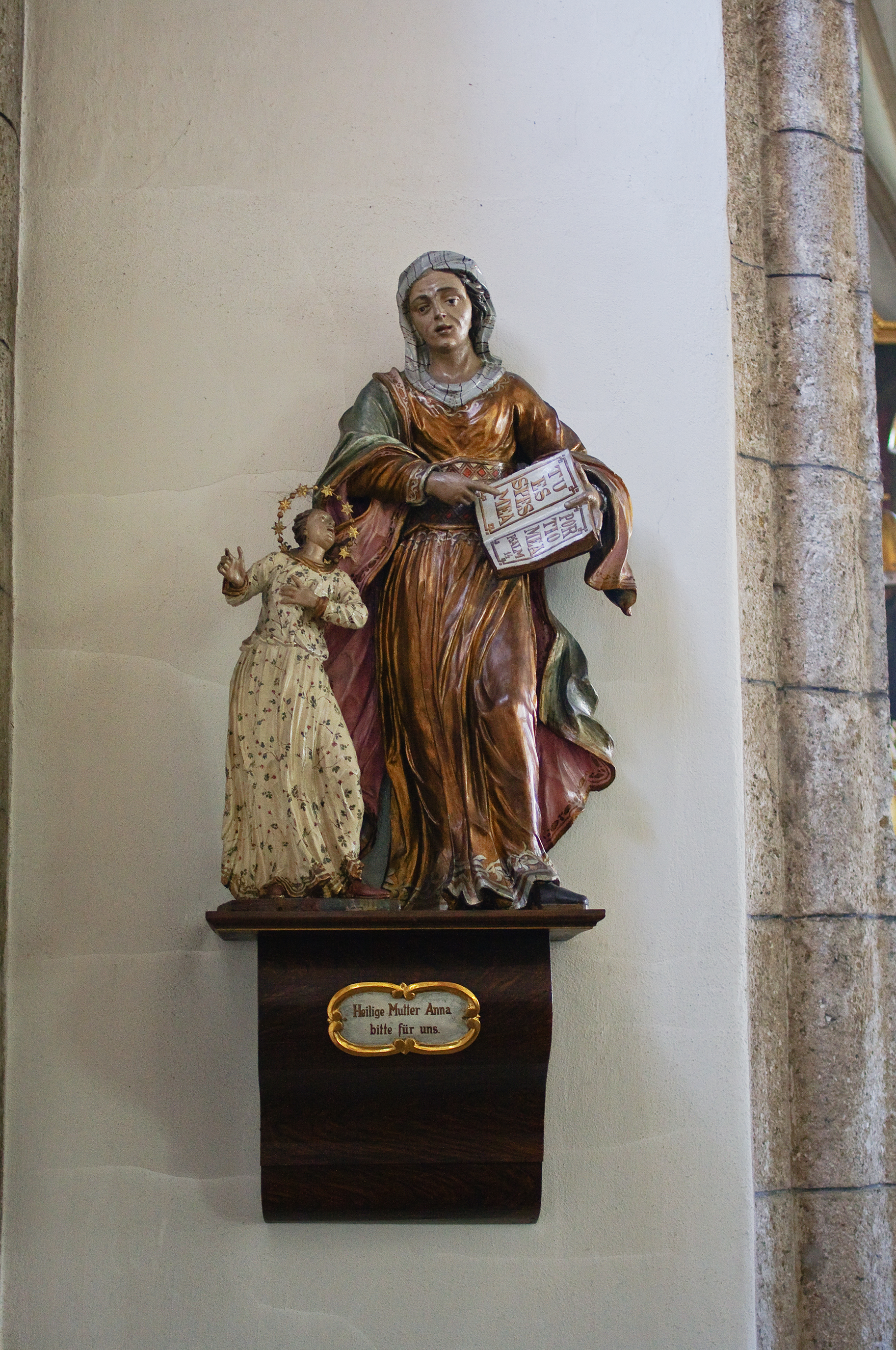
- Statue of Mary and Saint Anne in Molln church; Anne holds a scroll with a quotation from Ps 142: Tu es spes mea, portio mea ("Thou art my refuge and my portion.")
- Other name: Psalm 141 (Vulgate); "Voce mea ad Dominum clamavi"

Psalm 142
- ← Psalm 141 Psalm 143 →
- Book: Book of Psalms
- Hebrew Bible part: Ketuvim
- Order in the Hebrew part: 1
- Category: Sifrei Emet
- Christian Bible part: Old Testament
- Order in the Christian part: 19

Psalm 142 is the 142nd psalm of the Book of Psalms, beginning in English in the King James Version: "I cried unto the LORD with my voice." In the slightly different numbering system used in the Greek Septuagint version of the Bible, and the Latin Vulgate, this psalm is Psalm 141. In Latin, it is known as "Voce mea ad Dominum clamavi". It is attributed to David in the opening verses. It is labelled as a maschil or contemplation. The text is presented as a prayer uttered by David at the time he was hiding in the Cave of Adullam (part of the David and Jonathan narrative in the Books of Samuel). Albert Barnes notes that "a prayer when he was in the cave" could mean it was a prayer which he composed while in the cave, or one which he composed at a later date, "putting into a poetic form the substance of the prayer which he breathed forth there." It is, consequently, used as a prayer in times of distress.

The psalm is used as a regular part of Jewish, Catholic, Lutheran, Anglican and other Protestant liturgies; it has been set to music.

== Uses ==
=== Catholic Church ===
In Catholic liturgy, this psalm has been recited at Vespers since the Middle Ages. According to the Rule of St. Benedict (530), this psalm traditionally appeared on Friday night. In the current Liturgy of the Hours, this psalm is recited on Saturday Vespers in the first week of the cycle of four weeks. This psalm is known to have been recited by Saint Francis of Assisi on his deathbed.

=== Coptic Orthodox Church ===
In the Agpeya, the Coptic Church's book of hours, this psalm is prayed in the office of Compline and the third watch of the Midnight office.

=== Book of Common Prayer ===
Psalm 142 is said or sung at Evensong on the 29th of the month following the rubrics of the Book of Common Prayer.

== Musical settings ==
Heinrich Schütz composed a metred paraphrase of Psalm 142 in German, "Ich schrei zu meinem lieben Gott", SWV 247, for the Becker Psalter, published first in 1628.

Artemy Vedel composed a choral concerto based on the Psalm 142, Glasom moim. Polyphonic settings of the psalm have been composed by Andreas Hakenberger, Gracián Babán, and Jules Van Nuffel, among others.

== Text ==
The following table shows the Hebrew text of the Psalm with vowels, alongside the Koine Greek text in the Septuagint and the English translation from the King James Version. Note that the meaning can slightly differ between these versions, as the Septuagint and the Masoretic Text come from different textual traditions. (Note: A 1917 translation directly from Hebrew to English by the Jewish Publication Society can be found here or here, and an 1844 translation directly from the Septuagint by L. C. L. Brenton can be found here. Both translations are in the public domain.) In the Septuagint, this psalm is numbered Psalm 141.

| # | Hebrew | English | Greek |
|---|---|---|---|
| (Note: In the Jewish verse numbering, the ascription of this psalm is verse 1, and the rest of the psalm begins from verse 2. However, the Christian verse numbering does not count the ascription.) | מַשְׂכִּ֥יל לְדָוִ֑ד בִּֽהְיוֹת֖וֹ בַמְּעָרָ֣ה תְפִלָּֽה׃ | (Maschil of David; A Prayer when he was in the cave.) | Συνέσεως τῷ Δαυΐδ, ἐν τῷ εἶναι αὐτὸν ἐν τῷ σπηλαίῳ· προσευχή. - |
| 1 | ק֭וֹלִי אֶל־יְהֹוָ֣ה אֶזְעָ֑ק ק֝וֹלִ֗י אֶל־יְהֹוָ֥ה אֶתְחַנָּֽן׃ | I cried unto the LORD with my voice; with my voice unto the LORD did I make my supplication. | ΦΩΝῌ μου πρὸς Κύριον ἐκέκραξα, φωνῇ μου πρὸς Κύριον ἐδεήθην. |
| 2 | אֶשְׁפֹּ֣ךְ לְפָנָ֣יו שִׂיחִ֑י צָ֝רָתִ֗י לְפָנָ֥יו אַגִּֽיד׃ | I poured out my complaint before him; I shewed before him my trouble. | ἐκχεῶ ἐνώπιον αὐτοῦ τὴν δέησίν μου, τὴν θλῖψίν μου ἐνώπιον αὐτοῦ ἀπαγγελῶ. |
| 3 | בְּהִתְעַטֵּ֬ף עָלַ֨י ׀ רוּחִ֗י וְאַתָּה֮ יָדַ֢עְתָּ נְֽתִיבָ֫תִ֥י בְּאֹֽרַח־ז֥וּ אֲהַלֵּ֑ךְ טָמְנ֖וּ פַ֣ח לִֽי׃ | When my spirit was overwhelmed within me, then thou knewest my path. In the way wherein I walked have they privily laid a snare for me. | ἐν τῷ ἐκλείπειν ἐξ ἐμοῦ τὸ πνεῦμά μου, καὶ σὺ ἔγνως τὰς τρίβους μου· ἐν ὁδῷ ταύτῃ, ᾗ ἐπορευόμην, ἔκρυψαν παγίδα μοι. |
| 4 | הַבֵּ֤יט יָמִ֨ין ׀ וּרְאֵה֮ וְאֵֽין־לִ֢י מַ֫כִּ֥יר אָבַ֣ד מָנ֣וֹס מִמֶּ֑נִּי אֵ֖ין דּוֹרֵ֣שׁ לְנַפְשִֽׁי׃ | I looked on my right hand, and beheld, but there was no man that would know me: refuge failed me; no man cared for my soul. | κατενόουν εἰς τὰ δεξιὰ καὶ ἐπέβλεπον, καὶ οὐκ ἦν ὁ ἐπιγινώσκων με· ἀπώλετο φυγὴ ἀπ᾿ ἐμοῦ, καὶ οὐκ ἔστιν ὁ ἐκζητῶν τὴν ψυχήν μου. |
| 5 | זָעַ֥קְתִּי אֵלֶ֗יךָ יְ֫הֹוָ֥ה אָ֭מַרְתִּי אַתָּ֣ה מַחְסִ֑י חֶ֝לְקִ֗י בְּאֶ֣רֶץ הַחַיִּֽים׃ | I cried unto thee, O LORD: I said, Thou art my refuge and my portion in the land of the living. | ἐκέκραξα πρὸς σέ, Κύριε, εἶπα· σὺ εἶ ἡ ἐλπίς μου, μερίς μου εἶ ἐν γῇ ζώντων. |
| 6 | הַקְשִׁ֤יבָה ׀ אֶֽל־רִנָּתִי֮ כִּֽי־דַלּ֢וֹתִ֫י מְאֹ֥ד הַצִּילֵ֥נִי מֵרֹדְפַ֑י כִּ֖י אָמְצ֣וּ מִמֶּֽנִּי׃ | Attend unto my cry; for I am brought very low: deliver me from my persecutors; for they are stronger than I. | πρόσχες πρὸς τὴν δέησίν μου, ὅτι ἐταπεινώθην σφόδρα· ῥῦσαί με ἐκ τῶν καταδιωκόντων με, ὅτι ἐκραταιώθησαν ὑπὲρ ἐμέ. |
| 7 | ה֘וֹצִ֤יאָה מִמַּסְגֵּ֨ר ׀ נַפְשִׁי֮ לְהוֹד֢וֹת אֶת־שְׁ֫מֶ֥ךָ בִּ֭י יַכְתִּ֣רוּ צַדִּיקִ֑ים כִּ֖י תִגְמֹ֣ל עָלָֽי׃ | Bring my soul out of prison, that I may praise thy name: the righteous shall compass me about; for thou shalt deal bountifully with me. | ἐξάγαγε ἐκ φυλακῆς τὴν ψυχήν μου τοῦ ἐξομολογήσασθαι τῷ ὀνόματί σου· ἐμὲ ὑπομενοῦσι δίκαιοι, ἕως οὗ ἀνταποδῷς μοι. |

=== Verse 2 ===
I pour out my complaint before Him;
I declare before Him my trouble.

Barnes points out that the psalmist is not so much "complaining" as meditating, or praying for release.
