= Lluís Vicenç Gargallo =

Spanish composer

- Born: c. 1636
- Died: 19 February 1682 (aged 45–46); Barcelona
- Other names: Luis Vicente Gargallo
- Occupations: musician and composer
- Years active: 1659—1682

Lluís Vicenç Gargallo otherwise Luis Vicente Gargallo (circa 1636 — 19 February 1682) was a musician and composer from the Baroque period.

== Biography ==
Gargallo was born most probably in the Valencian Community. He entered as a child in the choir of the Valencia Cathedral towards 1648-1649 and stayed there until 1651 or 1652. There he received his first musical training given by the mestres de capella Francesc Navarro (until 1650) and Dídac Pontac.

On 7 June 1659, Gargallo succeeded the mestre de capella of the Huesca Cathedral, a position where Vargas i Babán had preceded him. He resigned to the place on 15 November 1667 to join two days later in the Barcelona Cathedral in the same position. As usual, he entered temporarily until the death of the holder, Marcià Albareda (21 August 1673), replacing him after that. Among his disciples in Barcelona, there were the future mestres de capella and composers Josep Gaz and Isidre Serrada. Gargallo died on 19 February 1682 in Barcelona, and was replaced temporarily by Jaume Riera, until Joan Barter took on the position on 13 July 1682.

Of his compositional production, extensive as it would be expected from a mestre de capella, a minimum of 74 different compositions have been preserved, distributed mainly in six archives: in the Library of Catalonia, in the cathedrals of Girona and Zaragoza, in the chapel of the Real Colegio Seminario del Corpus Christi, in Valencia, and the churches of Sant Pere de Canet de Mar and Santa Maria de Cervera. Its conserved liturgical production includes 32 works: eight for 4 to 16 voices, a mass for the dead, four masses from 5 to 8 voices and a requiem for two choirs; In addition, he made two oratorios, twenty five villancetes and fifteen tonos. He was the first known Catalan composer to cultivate the oratorio, a typically Baroque musical form.

== Works ==
=== Liturgic works ===
- Benedictus Dominus Israel
- 2 Cum invocarem
- 3 Dies irae
- Dixit Dominus
- Fratres, sobrii estote et vigilate, for 16 voices
- 2 In te Domine speravi
- 2 Laudate Dominum
- Libera me Domine, for 8 voices
- 2 Magnificat
- Memento Domine David
- Miserere a 8
- 3 Missa
- Missa de Batalla a 8
- Missa de Difunts, for 8 voices
- 5 Nunc dimittis
- O bone pastor
- 2 Qui habitat
- Responde mihi, lliçó de Difunts, for 8 voices

=== Other sacred and secular works ===
- A las fiestas que el cielo, a 4, tono
- Aguas suspended, parad, tono
- Ah de la guarda, a 5, villancete
- Alegría pecadores, a 10, villancete
- Aquí de la fe (in the 1670s), oratory for 10 voices, organ and continuo
- Aurora soberana, a 10, villancete
- Ay que se quema, a 4, tono
- Cuanto más la pierdo de vista, a 5, tono
- Detente, pasajero, a 4, tono
- El fuego i el aire, a 4, tono
- Historia de Joseph (in the 1670s), oratory
- Oiga todo pecador, a 8, villancete
- Oigan qué de quebrados, a 8, villancete
- Olé, que jacarilla que traigo, a 8, villancete
- Para una fiesta, a 11, villancete
- Por celebrar amorosos, a 10, villancete
- Principes persecuti sunt, a 8, villancete
- Que prisión, a 4, tono
- Salve, divina aurora, a 12, tono
- Válgame Dios, qué será, a 12, villancete

== Bibliography ==
- Francesc Bonastre "Aquí de la fe", oratori de Lluis Vicenç Gargallo (ca. 1636-1682). Estudi i edició, article a Recerca Musicològica 6-7 (1986-1987), p. 77-147 "Link".
- Francesc Bonastre "Historia de Joseph", oratori de Lluis Vicenç Gargallo (ca. 1636-1682). Estudi i transcripció Barcelona: Biblioteca de Catalunya, 1986
