= Francesco Pagano =

Italian painter

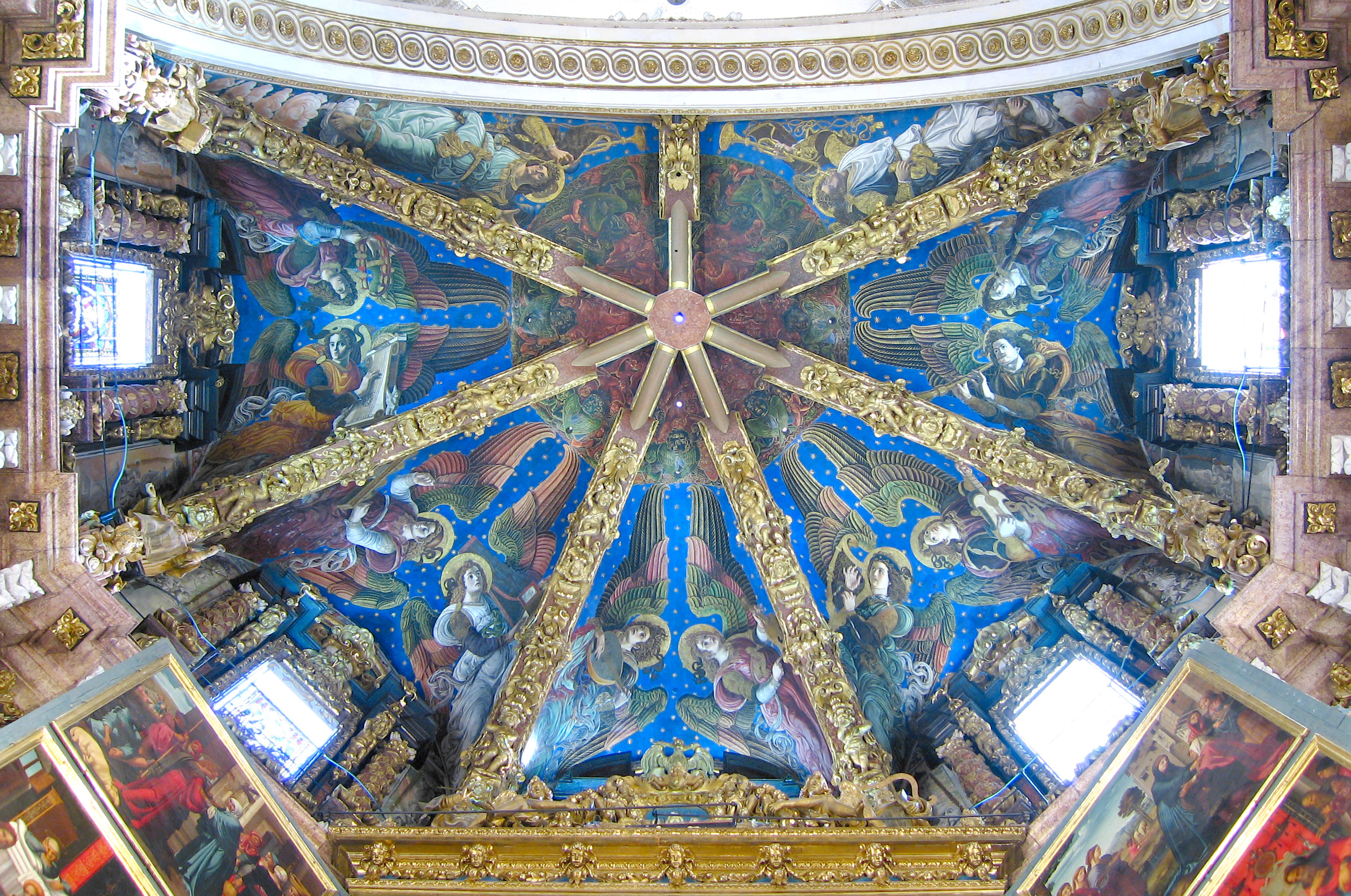
Angels playing music by Francesco Pagano and Paolo da San Leocadio, ceiling painting above the altar in the Valencia Cathedral, 1474

Francesco Pagano, (fl. 1471–1506) was an Italian painter working primarily in Spain. His date of birth is not known.

Pagano was active in Valencia, and primarily painted religious-themed works for local churches. He is credited with helping import the Italian Renaissance style to Spain. In 1472 he was commissioned in conjunction with Paolo da San Leocadio by the papal envoy Rodrigo Borja, a Spaniard who became Pope Alexander VI, to paint the ceiling of the Valencia Cathedral. A false ceiling had hidden the fresco for more than 330 years, until an investigation into some pigeons led to the discovery. He also painted, in 1506, again in conjunction with Paolo da San Leocadio, the doors of the high altar of the cathedral, with subjects from the Life of the Virgin.
