= Psalm 141 =

141st psalm of the book of psalms

- "LORD, I cry unto thee: make haste unto me"
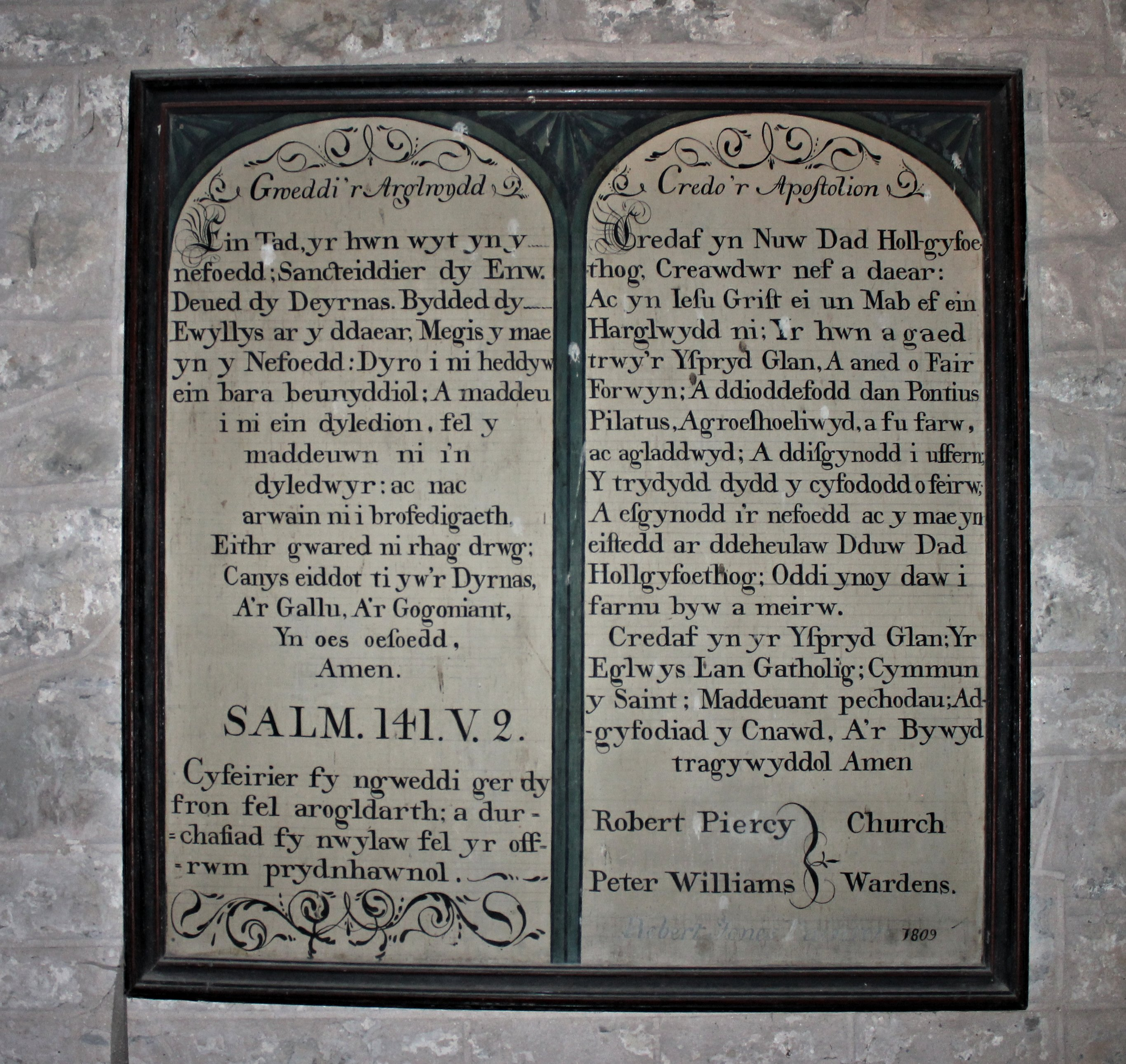
- Psalm 141:2 in Welsh on the boards on West wall (dated 1809). St Mary's Church, Cilcain Flintshire, North Wales.
- Other name: Psalm 140 (Vulgate); "Domine clamavi ad te exaudi me"

Psalm 141
- ← Psalm 140 Psalm 142 →
- Book: Book of Psalms
- Hebrew Bible part: Ketuvim
- Order in the Hebrew part: 1
- Category: Sifrei Emet
- Christian Bible part: Old Testament
- Order in the Christian part: 19

Psalm 141 is the 141st psalm of the Book of Psalms, a book of the Hebrew Bible and the Christian biblical canon, that begins in English in the King James Version: "LORD, I cry unto thee: make haste unto me". In the slightly different numbering system used in the Greek Septuagint version of the Bible, and the Latin Vulgate, this psalm is Psalm 140. In Latin, it is known as Domine clamavi ad te exaudi me.

It is attributed to David, a plea to God not only for protection from the psalmist's enemies, but also from temptation to sin. This psalm contains a prayer for deliverance from 'the enticements and the oppression of the wicked', and seeks 'divine support to live a sinless life', probably a prayer of an ordinary worshipper, although it has some indications for being a "king's psalm" offered during 'a military campaign far away from Jerusalem' (such as that he cannot offer sacrifice in the temple in verse 2 and laments over battle losses in verses 7).

The psalm is used as a regular part of Jewish, Catholic, Lutheran, Anglican and other Protestant liturgies; it has been set to music, for example, in the final motet of the Missa Voce Mea composed by Cristóbal de Medrano in 1594.

== Analysis ==
Verses 6-7 ("When their judges are overthrown in stony places...." in the KJV, or "thrown down from the cliffs" in the New International Version) are likely corrupt, and scholars call their translation a best guess.

Verses 8–10 express a plea for help against persecutors, in terms similar to Psalm 140 (cf. Psalm 35:8), and a wisdom teaching to be kept away from bad company (verse 4) is similar to Psalm 1. C. S. Rodd suggests that there are two sets of petitions in prayer, verses 5-7 and verses 8-10, although verse 5 might be read as belonging to the second petition. Alexander Kirkpatrick suggests that the final line of verse 5 could be read as a prayer "against their evil deeds" or "in the midst" of them.

The gins (viz. engines) in the KJV text of verse 9 translates מקשות, rendered "traps" in more recent translations (NRSV, NASB).

== Uses ==
=== Eastern Orthodox Church ===
As verse 2 compares prayer to an evening sacrifice, this psalm became part of Christian liturgy from an early time. John Chrysostom indicates that it was sung every day. As part of the liturgy practiced at Constantinople, it is preserved in the Liturgy of the Presanctified Gifts.

As part of the liturgy, it also has numerous musical adaptations, including Russian compositions (Да исправится молитва моя) by Dmitry Bortniansky, Mikhail Glinka, Aleksandr Grechaninov and Pavel Chesnokov.

=== Coptic Orthodox Church ===
In the Agpeya, the Coptic Church's book of hours, this psalm is prayed in the office of Compline and the third watch of the Midnight office. It is also in the prayer of the Veil, which is generally prayed only by monks.

=== Other ===
The Latin text (Dirigatur oratio mea) is adapted in a gradual by Johann Michael Haydn (MH 520) and in a motet by Orlando di Lasso.

The Lutheran Service Book and Evangelical Lutheran Worship feature the psalm prominently in their Evening Prayer services.

== Musical settings ==
Heinrich Schütz composed a metred paraphrase of Psalm 141 in German, "Herr, mein Gott, wenn ich ruf zu dir", SWV 246, for the Becker Psalter, published first in 1628.

== Text ==
The following table shows the Hebrew text of the Psalm with vowels, alongside the Koine Greek text in the Septuagint and the English translation from the King James Version. Note that the meaning can slightly differ between these versions, as the Septuagint and the Masoretic Text come from different textual traditions. (Note: A 1917 translation directly from Hebrew to English by the Jewish Publication Society can be found here or here, and an 1844 translation directly from the Septuagint by L. C. L. Brenton can be found here. Both translations are in the public domain.) In the Septuagint, this psalm is numbered Psalm 140.

| # | Hebrew | English | Greek |
|---|---|---|---|
| 1 | מִזְמ֗וֹר לְדָ֫וִ֥ד יְהֹוָ֣ה קְ֭רָאתִיךָ ח֣וּשָׁה לִּ֑י הַאֲזִ֥ינָה ק֝וֹלִ֗י בְּקׇרְאִי־לָֽךְ׃ | (A Psalm of David.) LORD, I cry unto thee: make haste unto me; give ear unto my voice, when I cry unto thee. | Ψαλμὸς τῷ Δαυΐδ. - ΚΥΡΙΕ, ἐκέκραξα πρὸς σέ, εἰσάκουσόν μου· πρόσχες τῇ φωνῇ τῆς δεήσεώς μου ἐν τῷ κεκραγέναι με πρὸς σέ. |
| 2 | תִּכּ֤וֹן תְּפִלָּתִ֣י קְטֹ֣רֶת לְפָנֶ֑יךָ מַֽשְׂאַ֥ת כַּ֝פַּ֗י מִנְחַת־עָֽרֶב׃ | Let my prayer be set forth before thee as incense; and the lifting up of my hands as the evening sacrifice. | κατευθυνθήτω ἡ προσευχή μου ὡς θυμίαμα ἐνώπιόν σου, ἔπαρσις τῶν χειρῶν μου θυσία ἑσπερινή. |
| 3 | שִׁיתָ֣ה יְ֭הֹוָה שׇׁמְרָ֣ה לְפִ֑י נִ֝צְּרָ֗ה עַל־דַּ֥ל שְׂפָתָֽי׃ | Set a watch, O LORD, before my mouth; keep the door of my lips. | θοῦ, Κύριε, φυλακὴν τῷ στόματί μου καὶ θύραν περιοχῆς περὶ τὰ χείλη μου. |
| 4 | אַל־תַּט־לִבִּ֨י לְדָבָ֪ר ׀ רָ֡ע לְהִתְע֘וֹלֵ֤ל עֲלִל֨וֹת ׀ בְּרֶ֗שַׁע אֶת־אִישִׁ֥ים פֹּעֲלֵי־אָ֑וֶן וּבַל־אֶ֝לְחַ֗ם בְּמַנְעַמֵּיהֶֽם׃ | Incline not my heart to any evil thing, to practise wicked works with men that work iniquity: and let me not eat of their dainties. | μὴ ἐκκλίνῃς τὴν καρδίαν μου εἰς λόγους πονηρίας τοῦ προφασίζεσθαι προφάσεις ἐν ἁμαρτίαις σὺν ἀνθρώποις ἐργαζομένοις τὴν ἀνομίαν, καὶ οὐ μὴ συνδυάσω μετὰ τῶν ἐκλεκτῶν αὐτῶν. |
| 5 | יֶ֥הֶלְמֵֽנִי צַדִּ֨יק ׀ חֶ֡סֶד וְֽיוֹכִיחֵ֗נִי שֶׁ֣מֶן רֹ֭אשׁ אַל־יָנִ֣י רֹאשִׁ֑י כִּי־ע֥וֹד וּ֝תְפִלָּתִ֗י בְּרָעוֹתֵיהֶֽם׃ | Let the righteous smite me; it shall be a kindness: and let him reprove me; it shall be an excellent oil, which shall not break my head: for yet my prayer also shall be in their calamities. | παιδεύσει με δίκαιος ἐν ἐλέει καὶ ἐλέγξει με, ἔλαιον δὲ ἁμαρτωλοῦ μὴ λιπανάτω τὴν κεφαλήν μου· ὅτι ἔτι καὶ ἡ προσευχή μου ἐν ταῖς εὐδοκίαις αὐτῶν· |
| 6 | נִשְׁמְט֣וּ בִֽידֵי־סֶ֭לַע שֹׁפְטֵיהֶ֑ם וְשָׁמְע֥וּ אֲ֝מָרַ֗י כִּ֣י נָעֵֽמוּ׃ | When their judges are overthrown in stony places, they shall hear my words; for they are sweet. | κατεπόθησαν ἐχόμενα πέτρας οἱ κριταὶ αὐτῶν· ἀκούσονται τὰ ῥήματά μου ὅτι ἡδύνθησαν. |
| 7 | כְּמ֤וֹ פֹלֵ֣חַ וּבֹקֵ֣עַ בָּאָ֑רֶץ נִפְזְר֥וּ עֲ֝צָמֵ֗ינוּ לְפִ֣י שְׁאֽוֹל׃ | Our bones are scattered at the grave's mouth, as when one cutteth and cleaveth wood upon the earth. | ὡσεὶ πάχος γῆς ἐρράγη ἐπὶ τῆς γῆς, διεσκορπίσθη τὰ ὀστᾶ αὐτῶν παρὰ τὸν ᾅδην. |
| 8 | כִּ֤י אֵלֶ֨יךָ ׀ יֱהֹוִ֣ה אֲדֹנָ֣י עֵינָ֑י בְּכָ֥ה חָ֝סִ֗יתִי אַל־תְּעַ֥ר נַפְשִֽׁי׃ | But mine eyes are unto thee, O GOD the LORD: in thee is my trust; leave not my soul destitute. | ὅτι πρὸς σέ, Κύριε, Κύριε, οἱ ὀφθαλμοί μου· ἐπὶ σοὶ ἤλπισα, μὴ ἀντανέλῃς τὴν ψυχήν μου. |
| 9 | שׇׁמְרֵ֗נִי מִ֣ידֵי פַ֭ח יָ֣קְשׁוּ לִ֑י וּ֝מֹקְשׁ֗וֹת פֹּ֣עֲלֵי אָֽוֶן׃ | Keep me from the snares which they have laid for me, and the gins of the workers of iniquity. | φύλαξόν με ἀπὸ παγίδος, ἧς συνεστήσαντό μοι, καὶ ἀπὸ σκανδάλων τῶν ἐργαζομένων τὴν ἀνομίαν. |
| 10 | יִפְּל֣וּ בְמַכְמֹרָ֣יו רְשָׁעִ֑ים יַ֥חַד אָ֝נֹכִ֗י עַֽד־אֶעֱבֽוֹר׃ | Let the wicked fall into their own nets, whilst that I withal escape. | πεσοῦνται ἐν ἀμφιβλήστρῳ αὐτῶν οἱ ἁμαρτωλοί· κατὰ μόνας εἰμὶ ἐγὼ ἕως ἂν παρέλθω. |
