= Hoçisht =

- Administrative unit
- Location within Albania
- Coordinates: 40°36′N 20°55′E
- Country: Albania
- County: Korçë
- Municipality: Devoll

Population (2011)
  - Administrative unit: 4,461
- Time zone: UTC+1 (CET)
  - Summer (DST): UTC+2 (CEST)
- Postal Code: 7009
- Area Code: (0)874

Hoçisht is a village and a former municipality in the Korçë County, southeastern Albania. At the 2015 local government reform it became a subdivision of the municipality Devoll. The population at the 2011 census was 4,461. The municipal unit consists of the villages Hoçisht, Grace, Baban, Stropan, Eçmenik, Përparimaj, Grapsh, Çipan, Borsh, Bradvicë.

== History ==
A Greek school was operating in the village of Hoçisht from the middle of the 19th century, until incorporation to the Albanian state, while the local Orthodox community had established a trust fund (called Lasso) for the well being of the locals. In the early 20th century the town of Hoçisht hosted additional Greek educational institutions, including primary and secondary schools for boys and girls, as well as a kindergarten.

During the Macedonian struggle, Nikolaos Dailakis, a Greek revolutionary was active in several Albanian speaking villages (Hoçisht, Grapsh and Bradvicë). In 1905, Dailakis had his hideout near Hoçisht.

During the Socialist People's Republic of Albania the local church property was confiscated by the state. Today, from the 10 Christian churches in 1967 only 5 survive: Saint Nicholas, Saints Kosmas and Damian, Saint Constantine, Saint John and Saint Kyriake.

At present, a Greek language institution is functioning in the town, as part of a joint Greek-Albanian initiative.

Hoçisht is described as a historically mostly Orthodox Christian town with a historic Church of Cosmas and Damien in Satrivaç that functioned as a "Christian sanctuary" which, like others, was visited by Albanian Christians and Albanian Muslims alike, as well as Roma.
