= Psalm 140 =

140th psalm of the biblical Book of Psalms

- "Deliver me, O LORD, from the evil man"
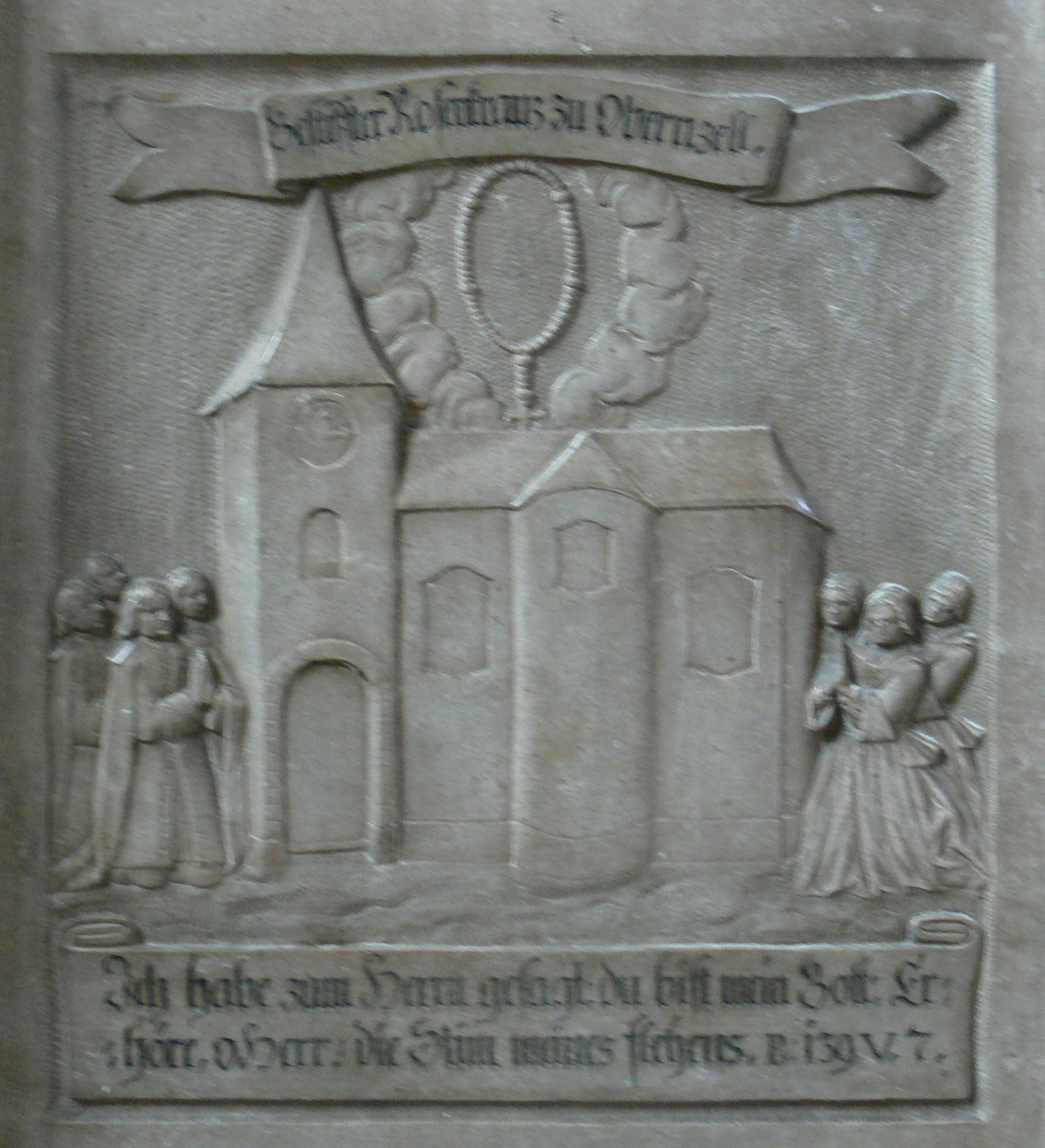
- Epitaph at St. Paul in Passau with a quote from Psalm 140:6 (139:7)
- Other name: Psalm 139 (Vulgate); "Eripe me Domine ab homine malo"
- Language: Hebrew (original)

Psalm 140
- ← Psalm 139 Psalm 141 →
- Book: Book of Psalms
- Hebrew Bible part: Ketuvim
- Order in the Hebrew part: 1
- Category: Sifrei Emet
- Christian Bible part: Old Testament
- Order in the Christian part: 19

Psalm 140 is the 140th psalm of the Book of Psalms, beginning in English in the King James Version: "Deliver me, O LORD, from the evil man". In the slightly different numbering system used in the Greek Septuagint version of the Bible, and the Latin Vulgate, this psalm is Psalm 139. In Latin, it is known as Eripe me Domine ab homine malo. It is part of the final Davidic collection of psalms, comprising Psalms 138 to 145, which are specifically attributed to David in their opening verses. It describes putting one's trust in God while threatened with evil. The New King James Version entitles it a "Prayer for Deliverance from Evil Men".

The psalm is used as a regular part of Jewish, Catholic, Lutheran, Anglican and other Protestant liturgies; it has been set to music.

== Structure ==
The Hebrew word Selah, possibly an instruction on the reading of the text, breaks the psalm after verses 3, 5 and 8. C. S. Rodd argues that the psalm's structure is unclear, but suggests:

- Verses 1-5: a prayer for help
- Verses 6-7: an expression of confidence in God
- Verses 8-11: an appeal against the psalmist's enemies
- Verses 12-13: another expression of confidence in God, which may reflect a priestly or prophetic assurance that the psalmist's prayer has been heard.

== Uses ==
=== New Testament ===
In the New Testament, verse 3b, The poison of asps is under their lips, is quoted in Romans 3:13.

== Musical settings ==
Heinrich Schütz composed a metred paraphrase of Psalm 140 in German, "Von bösen Menschen rette mich", SWV 245, for the Becker Psalter, published first in 1628.

Éric Gaudibert composed a setting in Latin, Eripe me, Domine, for mixed double chorus a cappella in 1978. Herman Berlinski wrote A Psalm of Unity, for soprano, mezzo-soprano and two altos, with from Psalm 140 and Psalm 133 in 1980.

== Text ==
The following table shows the Hebrew text of the Psalm with vowels, alongside the Koine Greek text in the Septuagint and the English translation from the King James Version. Note that the meaning can slightly differ between these versions, as the Septuagint and the Masoretic Text come from different textual traditions. (Note: A 1917 translation directly from Hebrew to English by the Jewish Publication Society can be found here or here, and an 1844 translation directly from the Septuagint by L. C. L. Brenton can be found here. Both translations are in the public domain.) In the Septuagint, this psalm is numbered Psalm 139.

#	Hebrew	English	Greek
(Note: In the Jewish verse numbering, the ascription of this psalm is verse 1, and the rest of the psalm begins from verse 2. However, the Christian verse numbering does not count the ascription.)	לַמְנַצֵּ֗חַ מִזְמ֥וֹר לְדָוִֽד׃	(To the chief Musician, A Psalm of David.)	Εἰς τὸ τέλος· ψαλμὸς τῷ Δαυΐδ. -
1	חַלְּצֵ֣נִי יְ֭הֹוָה מֵֽאָדָ֣ם רָ֑ע מֵאִ֖ישׁ חֲמָסִ֣ים תִּנְצְרֵֽנִי׃	Deliver me, O LORD, from the evil man: preserve me from the violent man;	ΕΞΕΛΟΥ με, Κύριε, ἐξ ἀνθρώπου πονηροῦ, ἀπὸ ἀνδρὸς ἀδίκου ῥῦσαί με,
2	אֲשֶׁ֤ר חָשְׁב֣וּ רָע֣וֹת בְּלֵ֑ב כׇּל־י֝֗וֹם יָג֥וּרוּ מִלְחָמֽוֹת׃	Which imagine mischiefs in their heart; continually are they gathered together for war.	οἵτινες ἐλογίσαντο ἀδικίαν ἐν καρδίᾳ, ὅλην τὴν ἡμέραν παρετάσσοντο πολέμους·
3	שָׁ֥נְנ֣וּ לְשׁוֹנָם֮ כְּֽמוֹ־נָ֫חָ֥שׁ חֲמַ֥ת עַכְשׁ֑וּב תַּ֖חַת שְׂפָתֵ֣ימוֹ סֶֽלָה׃	They have sharpened their tongues like a serpent; adders' poison is under their lips. Selah.	ἠκόνησαν γλῶσσαν αὐτῶν ὡσεὶ ὄφεως, ἰὸς ἀσπίδων ὑπὸ τὰ χείλη αὐτῶν. (διάψαλμα).
4	שׇׁמְרֵ֤נִי יְהֹוָ֨ה ׀ מִ֘ידֵ֤י רָשָׁ֗ע מֵאִ֣ישׁ חֲמָסִ֣ים תִּנְצְרֵ֑נִי אֲשֶׁ֥ר חָ֝שְׁב֗וּ לִדְח֥וֹת פְּעָמָֽי׃	Keep me, O LORD, from the hands of the wicked; preserve me from the violent man; who have purposed to overthrow my goings.	φύλαξόν με, Κύριε, ἐκ χειρὸς ἁμαρτωλοῦ, ἀπὸ ἀνθρώπων ἀδίκων ἐξελοῦ με, οἵτινες διελογίσαντο τοῦ ὑποσκελίσαι τὰ διαβήματά μου·
5	טָ֥מְנֽוּ־גֵאִ֨ים ׀ פַּ֡ח לִ֗י וַחֲבָלִ֗ים פָּ֣רְשׂוּ רֶ֭שֶׁת לְיַד־מַעְגָּ֑ל מֹקְשִׁ֖ים שָׁתוּ־לִ֣י סֶֽלָה׃	The proud have hid a snare for me, and cords; they have spread a net by the wayside; they have set gins for me. Selah.	ἔκρυψαν ὑπερήφανοι παγίδα μοι καὶ σχοινία διέτειναν, παγίδα τοῖς ποσί μου, ἐχόμενα τρίβους σκάνδαλα ἔθεντό μοι. (διάψαλμα).
6	אָמַ֣רְתִּי לַ֭יהֹוָה אֵ֣לִי אָ֑תָּה הַאֲזִ֥ינָה יְ֝הֹוָ֗ה ק֣וֹל תַּחֲנוּנָֽי׃	I said unto the LORD, Thou art my God: hear the voice of my supplications, O LORD.	εἶπα τῷ Κυρίῳ· Θεός μου εἶ σύ, ἐνώτισαι, Κύριε, τὴν φωνὴν τῆς δεήσεώς μου.
7	יֱהֹוִ֣ה אֲ֭דֹנָי עֹ֣ז יְשׁוּעָתִ֑י סַכֹּ֥תָה לְ֝רֹאשִׁ֗י בְּי֣וֹם נָֽשֶׁק׃	O GOD the Lord, the strength of my salvation, thou hast covered my head in the day of battle.	Κύριε, Κύριε, δύναμις τῆς σωτηρίας μου, ἐπεσκίασας ἐπὶ τὴν κεφαλήν μου ἐν ἡμέρᾳ πολέμου.
8	אַל־תִּתֵּ֣ן יְ֭הֹוָה מַאֲוַיֵּ֣י רָשָׁ֑ע זְמָמ֥וֹ אַל־תָּ֝פֵ֗ק יָר֥וּמוּ סֶֽלָה׃	Grant not, O LORD, the desires of the wicked: further not his wicked device; lest they exalt themselves. Selah.	μὴ παραδῷς με, Κύριε, ἀπὸ τῆς ἐπιθυμίας μου ἁμαρτωλῷ· διελογίσαντο κατ᾿ ἐμοῦ, μὴ ἐγκαταλίπῃς με, μήποτε ὑψωθῶσιν. (διάψαλμα).
9	רֹ֥אשׁ מְסִבָּ֑י עֲמַ֖ל שְׂפָתֵ֣ימוֹ (יכסומו) [יְכַסֵּֽימוֹ]׃	As for the head of those that compass me about, let the mischief of their own lips cover them.	ἡ κεφαλὴ τοῦ κυκλώματος αὐτῶν, κόπος τῶν χειλέων αὐτῶν καλύψει αὐτούς.
10	(ימיטו) [יִמּ֥וֹטוּ] עֲלֵיהֶ֗ם גֶּחָ֫לִ֥ים בָּאֵ֥שׁ יַפִּלֵ֑ם בְּ֝מַהֲמֹר֗וֹת בַּל־יָקֽוּמוּ׃	Let burning coals fall upon them: let them be cast into the fire; into deep pits, that they rise not up again.	πεσοῦνται ἐπ᾿ αὐτοὺς ἄνθρακες, ἐν πυρὶ καταβαλεῖς αὐτούς, ἐν ταλαιπωρίαις οὐ μὴ ὑποστῶσιν.
11	אִ֥ישׁ לָשׁוֹן֮ בַּל־יִכּ֢וֹן בָּ֫אָ֥רֶץ אִישׁ־חָמָ֥ס רָ֑ע יְ֝צוּדֶ֗נּוּ לְמַדְחֵפֹֽת׃	Let not an evil speaker be established in the earth: evil shall hunt the violent man to overthrow him.	ἀνὴρ γλωσσώδης οὐ κατευθυνθήσεται ἐπὶ τῆς γῆς, ἄνδρα ἄδικον κακὰ θηρεύσει εἰς διαφθοράν.
12	(ידעת) [יָדַ֗עְתִּי] כִּֽי־יַעֲשֶׂ֣ה יְ֭הֹוָה דִּ֣ין עָנִ֑י מִ֝שְׁפַּ֗ט אֶבְיֹנִֽים׃	I know that the LORD will maintain the cause of the afflicted, and the right of the poor.	ἔγνων ὅτι ποιήσει Κύριος τὴν κρίσιν τῶν πτωχῶν καὶ τὴν δίκην τῶν πενήτων.
13	אַ֣ךְ צַ֭דִּיקִים יוֹד֣וּ לִשְׁמֶ֑ךָ יֵשְׁב֥וּ יְ֝שָׁרִ֗ים אֶת־פָּנֶֽיךָ׃	Surely the righteous shall give thanks unto thy name: the upright shall dwell in thy presence.	πλὴν δίκαιοι ἐξομολογήσονται τῷ ὀνόματί σου, κατοικήσουσιν εὐθεῖς σὺν τῷ προσώπῳ σου.
