= Victoria Musicae =

Victoria Musicae is a Spanish early music group based in Valencia, Spain.

The group was founded in 1992, and since 1993 has been led by Josep Ramón Gil-Tàrrega. The group has worked with other Valencian ensembles Capella de Ministrers in early music and the instrumental ensemble Estil Concertant in baroque music. The group's primary area of activity is the performance of Spanish and in particular Valencian composers. José de Nebra (1702-1768), Ginés Pérez de la Parra (1548-1600), Joan Baptista Comes (1582-1643) and Ambrosio Cotes (c.1550-1603), and chapel masters of the Real Colegio del Corpus Christi in Valencia during the 17th Century.

The group has performed at the early music festival of Peñíscola, the Cathedral of Valencia, the University of Valencia, and the Palau de la Música of Valencia. The group's activities have been supported or subsidized by various governmental and cultural funds in Valencia.
