= La mà de Guido =

La mà de Guido is a Catalan music publishing house in Barcelona, Spain founded in 1986 by the composer and musicologist Llorenç Balsach (b. 1953).

The name La Mà de Guido comes from the Catalan translation of the Guidonian hand.

The primary notability of La Mà de Guido is in the publishing of music scores and editions for Catalan composers, living and dead. The music publishing house also owns a recording label; this is primarily reviving the works of Catalan composers, but also recordings by Catalan musicians of other Iberian music, and archive historical recordings. The label also distributes the Ars Harmonica label.

== Published composers ==
- Josep Fàbrega (?-1791)
- Felip Pedrell (1841–1922)
- Enric Morera (1865–1942)
- Joaquim Cassadó (1867–1926)
- Josep Barberà (1877–1947)
- Antoni Massana (1890–1966)
- Agustí Borgunyó (1894–1967)
- Eduard Toldrà (1895–1962)
- Gaspar Cassadó (1897–1966)
- Manuel Blancafort (1897–1987)
- Lamote de Grignon (1899–1962)
- Joaquim Homs (1906–2003)
- J.M. Mestres Quadreny (b. 1929)
- Josep Soler (b. 1935)
- Llorenç Balsach (b. 1953)
- Jesús Rodriguez-Picó (b. 1953)
- José Galeote (b. 1970)
- David Esterri Carrasquer (b. 1970)
- Miguel Castro Santafé (b. 2001)

== Recording artists ==
- Victoria Musicae. Dir. Josep R. Gil Tàrrega.
- Musica Reservata de Barcelona. Dir. including Bruno Turner, Peter Phillips (conductor).
- Harmonia del Parnàs. Dir. Marian Rosa Montagut.
- Maria Teresa Garrigosa. soprano.
