= Josep Prades i Gallent =

Spanish organist and composer

El Gran Padre de Familias (fragment)
Espais de Llum Musical

Josep Prades i Gallent (Spanish: José Pradas Gallén) (1689–1757; born and died in Villahermosa del Río, Castelló) was a Spanish organist and composer at Valencia Cathedral during the Baroque period.

== Life ==
By 1700 Prades was singing in the choir of Valencia Cathedral, where he probably learned from Joan Baptista Cabanilles. In 1712 he was appointed organist and chapel master in the church of Algemesi, and in 1717 he was appointed to the same duties in the church of Santa Maria in Castelló de la Plana. Finally, in 1728, he was appointed chapel master in Valencia Cathedral, where he strengthened the musical chapel by contracting new musicians and increasing the importance of the instrumental parts. After twenty nine years of dedicated labour he asked to be allowed to retire for reasons of health, and died, probably from an attack of apoplexy, in his native village, Vilafermosa (Villahermosa).

== Works ==
=== Religious vocal music in Latin ===
- 11 Mass
- 24 Motets
- 56 Psalms
- 1 Lamentation
- 9 Songs
- 4 Antiphon
- 2 Versos
- 3 Passions

=== Religious vocal music in Castilian ===
- 95 Villancico to Nacimiento
- 95 Villancico to Corpus Christi
- 82 Villancico to Virgin Mary
- 22 Villancico to Saints
- 5 Villancico to nunks
- 4 cantates
- Other minor works

== Recordings ==
- Criaturas de Dios. Espais de Llum Musical, 1 CD. (2008).
- El Gran Padre de Familias. Espais de Llum Musical, 1 CD. (2008).
- Galán Embozado. Espais de Llum Musical, 1 CD. (2008).
