= Serwan Baban =

Kurdish politician

Minister of Agriculture and Water Resources
- In office April 2012 – May 2014

Personal details
- Born: 1958 (age 67–68)
- Education: University of Baghdad; University of East Anglia

Serwan Muhammad J. Baban FRGS FGS (born 1958) is a Kurdish technocrat who served as Minister of Agriculture and Water Resources in the Kurdistan Regional Government from 2012 to 2014. Currently he is the Chief Scientific Advisor for the Council of Ministers, Kurdistan Regional Government, Iraq. Previously he was the Vice-Chancellor of Cihan University from December 2014 to April 2017.

Professor Baban was educated at the University of Baghdad (BSc, MSc) and at the University of East Anglia (PhD, 1991). He subsequently worked as a research associate at the University of East Anglia, before holding academic posts at the University of Coventry in the UK, the University of the West Indies and Southern Cross University, Australia. He was awarded a Doctor of Science Degree from the University of East Anglia in 2010.

He previously served as Vice-Chancellor of the University of Kurdistan Hewler from 2009 to 2012.
