= Bavan-e Sofla =

Bavan-e Sofla بوان سفلي
- Village
- Location within Iran
- Coordinates: 30°02′56″N 51°38′23″E
- Country: Iran
- Province: Fars
- County: Mamasani
- Bakhsh: Central
- Rural District: Bakesh-e Yek

Population (2006)
  - Total: 86
- Time zone: UTC+3:30 (IRST)
  - Summer (DST): UTC+4:30 (IRDT)

Bavan-e Sofla (Persian: بوان سفلي, also Romanized as Bavān-e Soflá; (also known as Bavān-e Pā‘īn, Bovān Pā‘īn, Bovan Pa`in and Bovān Pā‘īn) is a village in Bakesh-e Yek Rural District, in the Central District of Mamasani County, Fars province, Iran. At the 2006 census, its population was 86, in 20 families.
