= Taha Baban =

Kurdish writer and artist

- Born: Sulaymaniyah, Iraq
- Occupations: Writer, Artist
- Writing career
- Language: Kurdish
- Subjects: Human rights, Crimes against humanity under Saddam Hussein
- Notable awards: Founder of the Baban Golden Prize

Taha Baban is a Kurdish writer and artist.

He was born in Suleymania, Iraq and has written a number of books demonstrating the crimes of the former regime led by Saddam Hussein. Taha Baban initiated the annual Baban Golden Prize in 1970, which is awarded to actors considered to have given the best performance of the year.
