= Gracián Babán =

Gracián Babán (c. 1620 – February 2, 1675) was a Valencian musician and composer.

He was musical director in the Cathedral of Valencia from 1657 to 1675. Over forty of his masses and motets, written for several choirs, are preserved at Valencia. His setting of Psalm 142 (Voce mea ad Dominum) was included in Hilarión Eslava's collection Lira sacro-hispana (1869).
