= Valencia Cathedral =

Cathedral in Valencia, Spain

- Metropolitan Cathedral-Basilica of the Assumption of Our Lady of Valencia
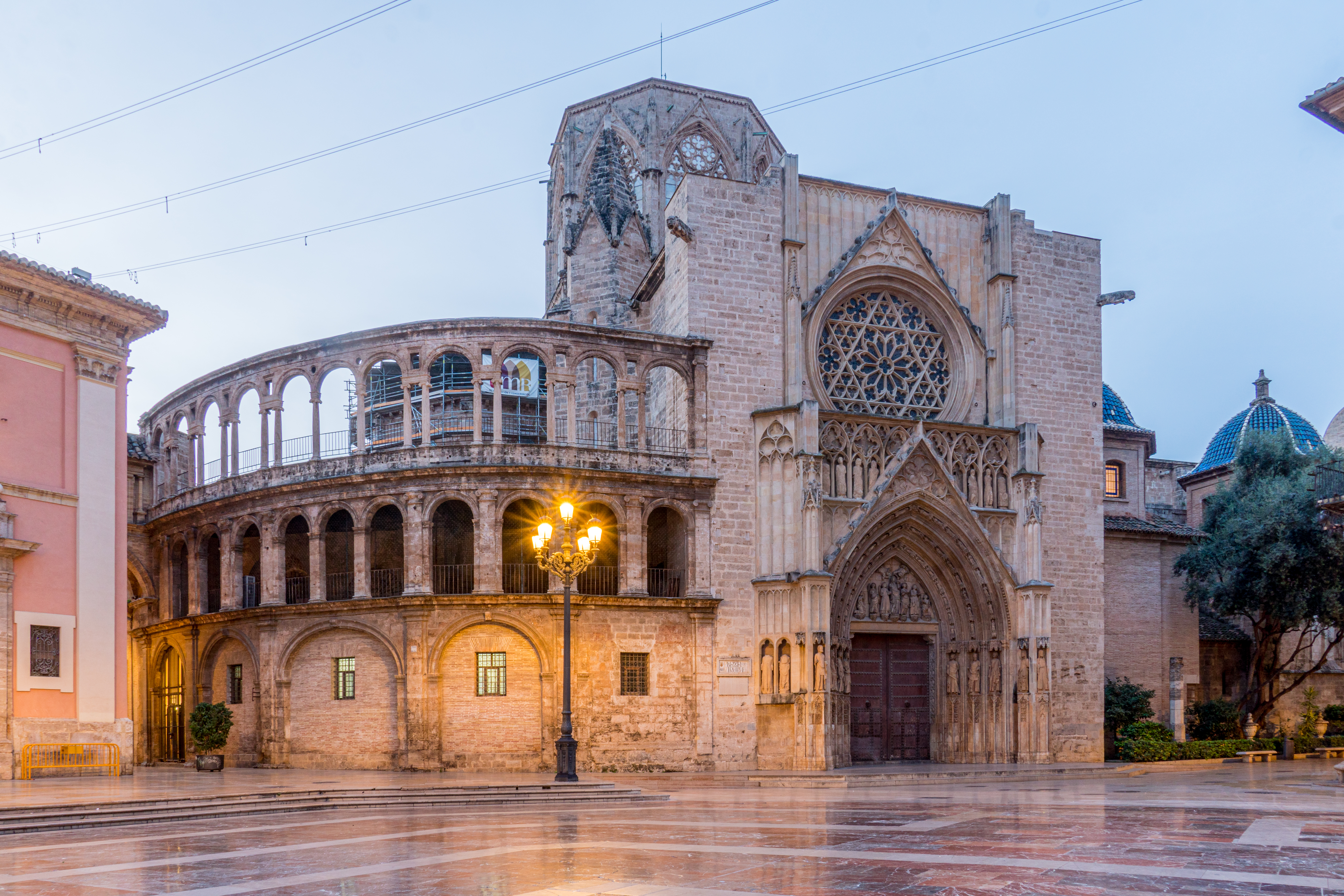
- North-west façade from the Plaza of the Virgin
- Valencia Cathedral
- 39°28′33″N 0°22′30″W
- Location: Valencia
- Address: Plaza de la Almoina, s/n
- Country: Spain
- Denomination: Catholic Church
- Website: www.catedraldevalencia.es

History
- Status: Cathedral, minor basilica
- Dedication: Assumption of Mary

Architecture
- Architectural type: Church architecture
- Style: Valencian Gothic
- Groundbreaking: 22 June 1262

Administration
- Archdiocese: Valencia

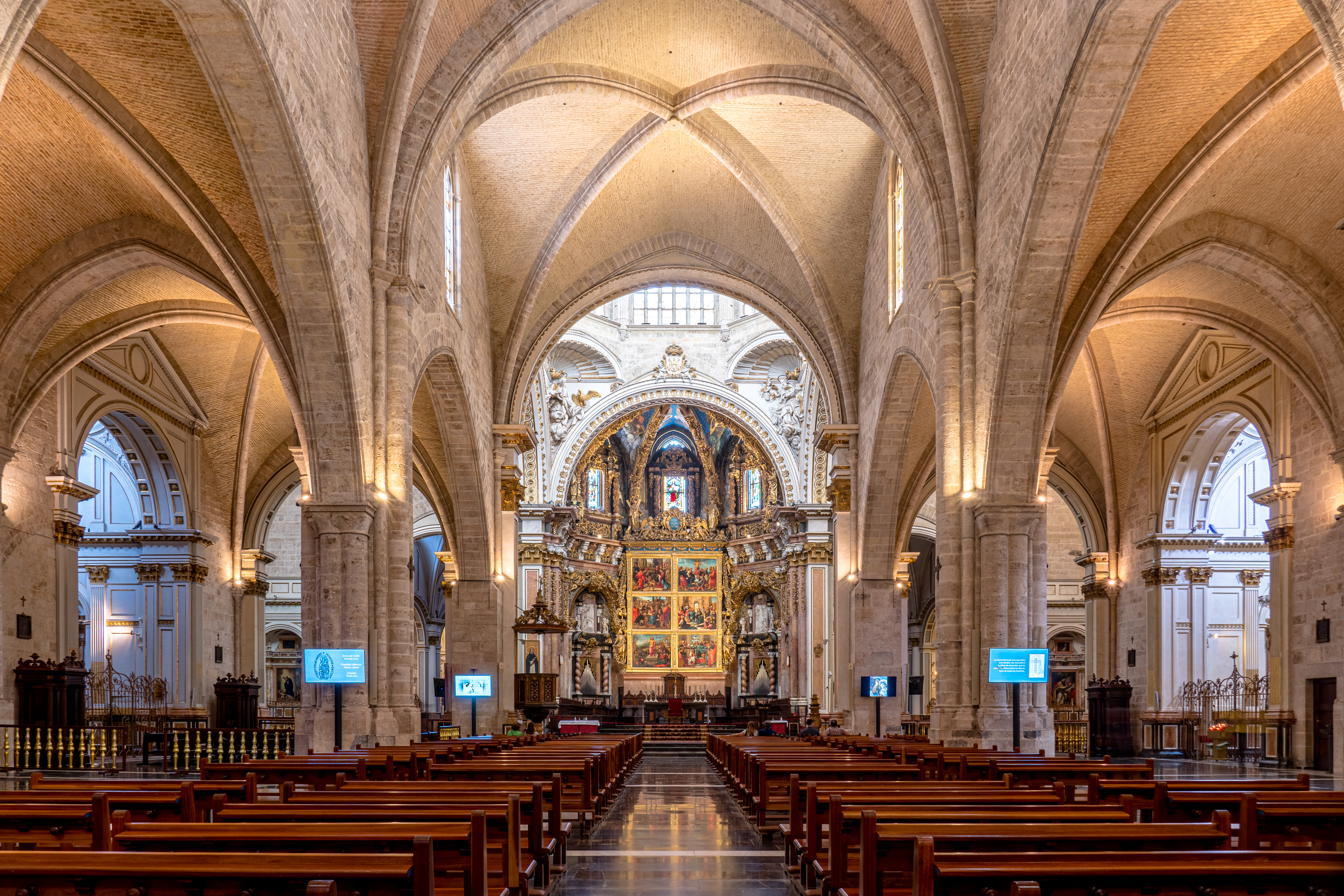
Nave of the cathedral

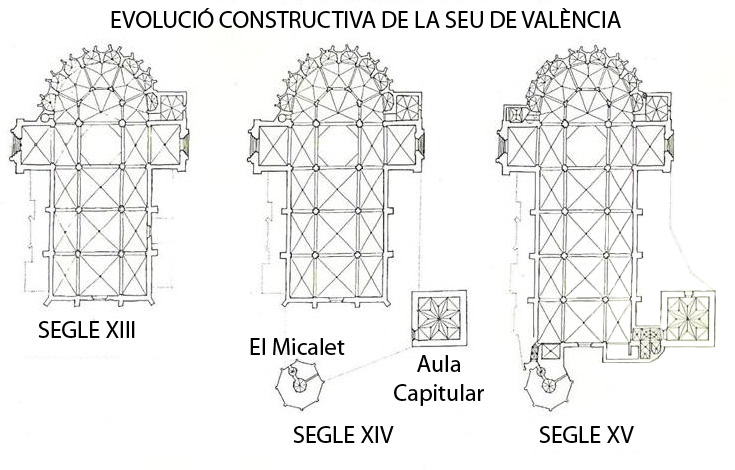
Building development

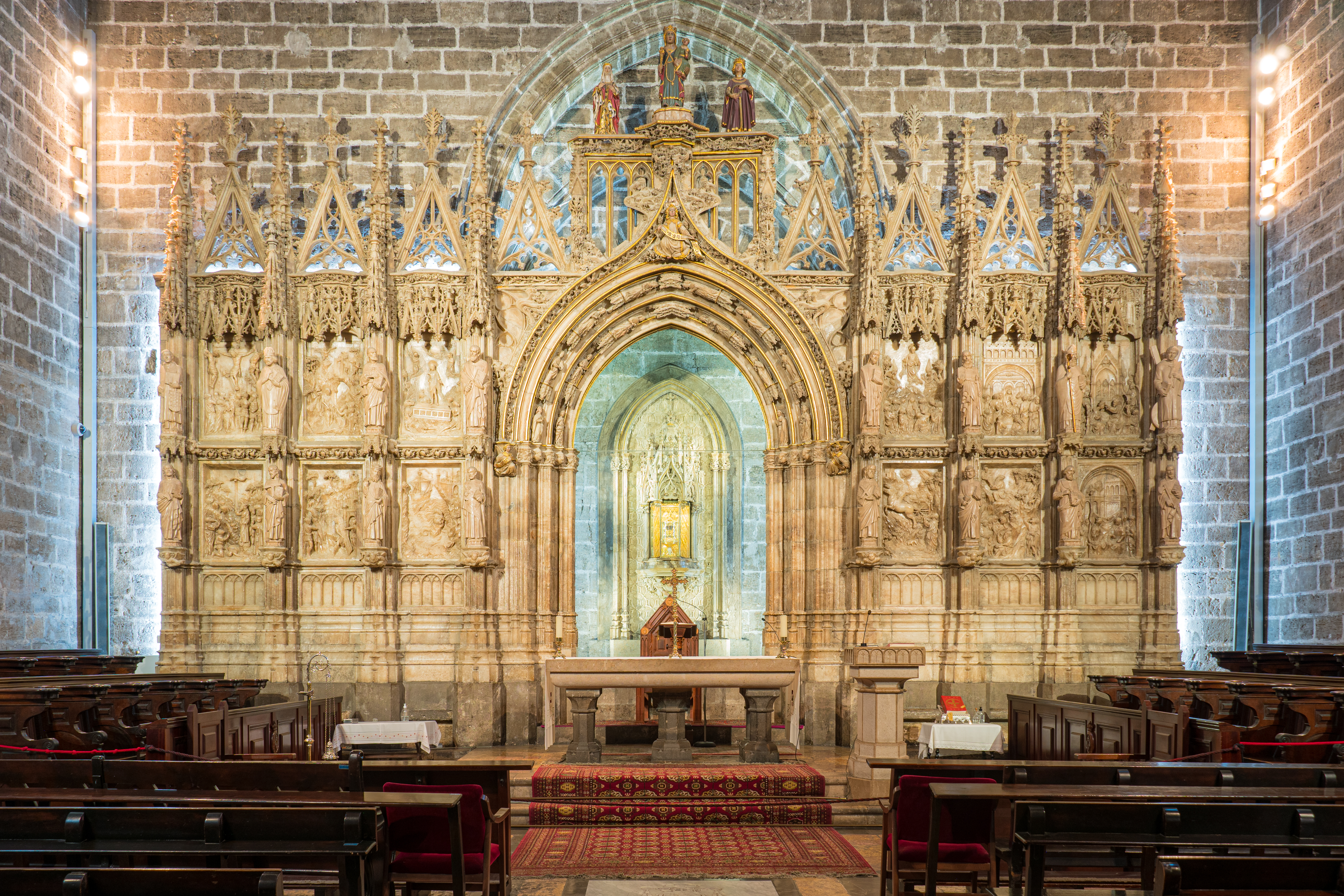
Chapel of the Holy Chalice

Valencia Cathedral, at greater length the Metropolitan Cathedral–Basilica of the Assumption of Our Lady of Valencia, (Note: Spanish: Iglesia Catedral-Basílica Metropolitana de la Asunción de Nuestra Señora de Valencia, Valencian: Església Catedral-Basílica Metropolitana de l'Assumpció de la Mare de Déu de València) also known as St Mary's Cathedral, is a Catholic church in Valencia, Spain.

The cathedral was consecrated in 1238 by the first bishop of Valencia after the Reconquista, Pere d'Albalat, Archbishop of Tarragona, and was dedicated to Saint Mary by order of James I the Conqueror. It was built over the site of the former Visigothic cathedral, which under the Moors had been turned into a mosque. Valencian Gothic is the predominant architectural style of the cathedral, although it also contains Romanesque, French Gothic, Renaissance, Baroque and Neoclassical elements.

The cathedral contains numerous 15th-century paintings, some by local artists (such as Jacomart), others by the Italian Renaissance artists Francesco Pagano and Paolo da San Leocadio, both commissioned by the Valencian Pope Alexander VI who, when still a cardinal, also made the request to elevate the Valencian See to the rank of metropolitan see, a category granted by Pope Innocent VIII in 1492.

A purported Holy Chalice, believed by many to be the true Holy Grail, is kept in one of the cathedral's chapels.

== History ==
Excavations of Almoina Archaeological Centre have unearthed the remains of the ancient Visigothic cathedral, which later became a mosque. There is documentary evidence that some decades after the Christian conquest of the city (1238), the mosque-cathedral remained standing, even with the Koranic inscriptions on the walls, until 22 June 1262, when the then bishop Andreu d'Albalat (Note: Brother of Pere d'Albalat, the first bishop of Valencia and archbishop of Tarragona. Andreu was bishop from 1248 to 1276. Possession of this diocese was desired by both the Archbishop of Toledo and the Archbishop of Tarragona, who eventually took control of it thanks to the support of James I of Aragon, who wanted to preserve their kingdoms' independence from Castilian interference.) resolved to knock it down and build a new cathedral in its place according to the plans of the architect Arnau Vidal. Hypothetically, the ancient Muslim mosque would correspond with the current transept of the cathedral, the Apostles' gate would be the entrance to the mosque and the Almoina ("alms") gate the mihrab.

Most of Valencia Cathedral was built between the 13th century and the 15th century, and this style was mainly Gothic. However, its construction went on for centuries. (Note: In fact this is the origin of a typical Catalan saying in Valencia: "Això és més llarg que l’obra de la Seu” ("This is taking longer than building the cathedral") which refers to something that is never finished.) As a consequence there is a mixture of artistic styles, ranging from the early Romanesque, Valencian Gothic, Renaissance, Baroque and Neoclassical.

Stones from neighboring quarries in Burjassot and Godella were used to build the cathedral, but also from other more distant quarries such as those in Benidorm and Xàbia which came by boat.

Some reasons for the simplicity and sobriety of Valencia Cathedral are that it was built quickly to mark the Christian territory against the Muslims, and that it was not a work by a king, but by the local bourgeoisie.

== Construction ==
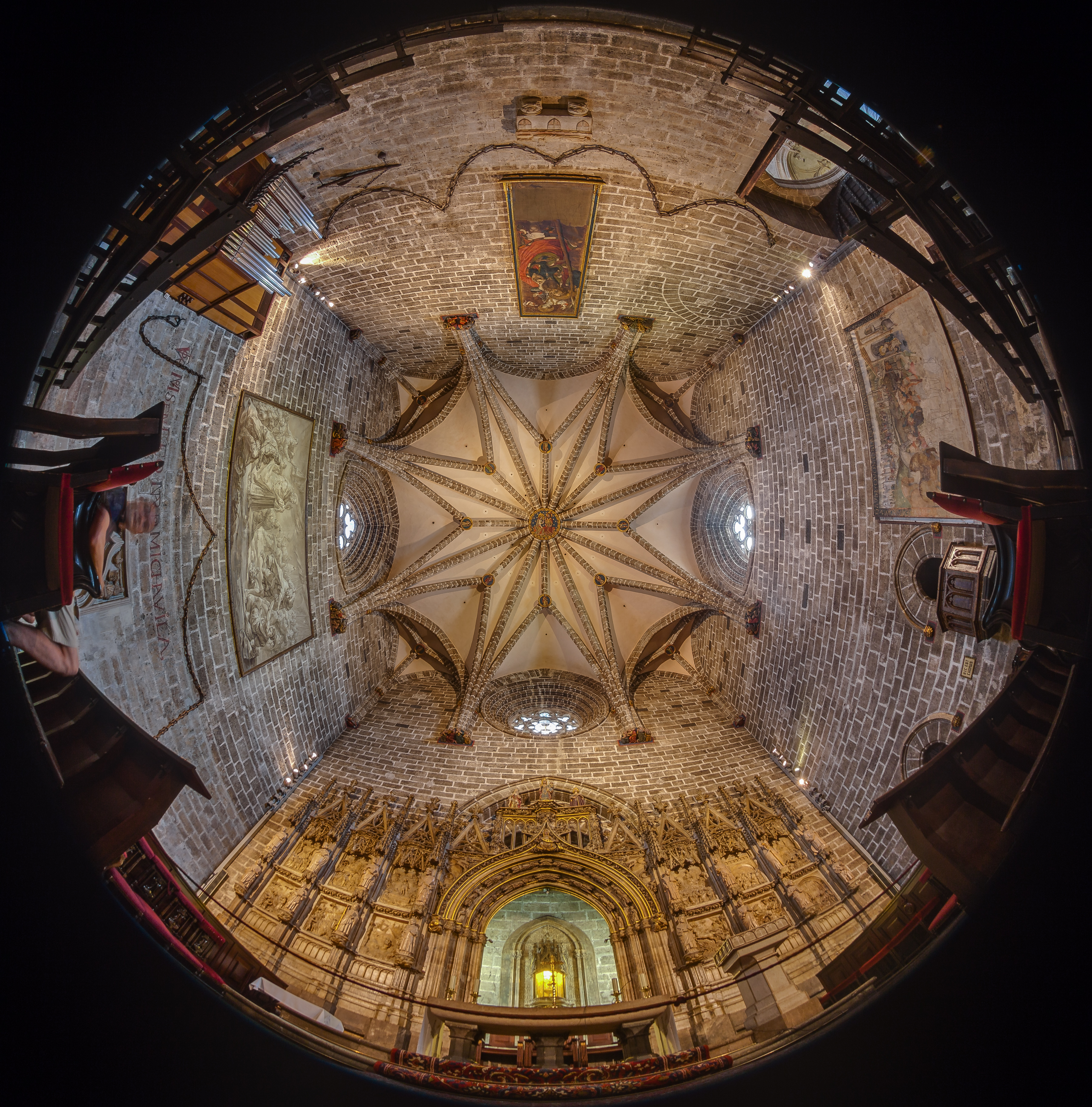
Round view of the Holy Chalice chapel

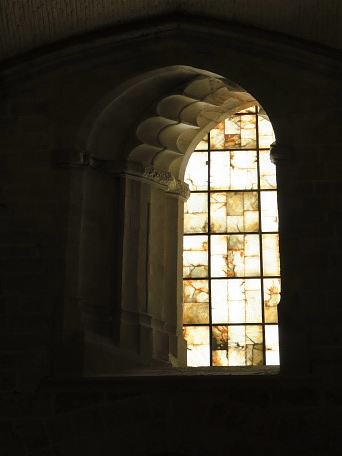
Alabaster window in Valencia Cathedral. Note the asymmetrical, slanted left side of the wall-frame, which lets sun rays reach the chancel.

Although there are several styles of construction, this cathedral is basically a Gothic building, a cruciform plan with transepts north and south, and a crossing covered by an octagonal tower (cimbori), with an ambulatory and a polygonal apse.

This cathedral was begun at the end of the 13th century (1270–1300) at the same time as the mosque was being demolished. The first part to be finished was the ambulatory with its eight radiating chapels, and the Almoina Romanesque gate.

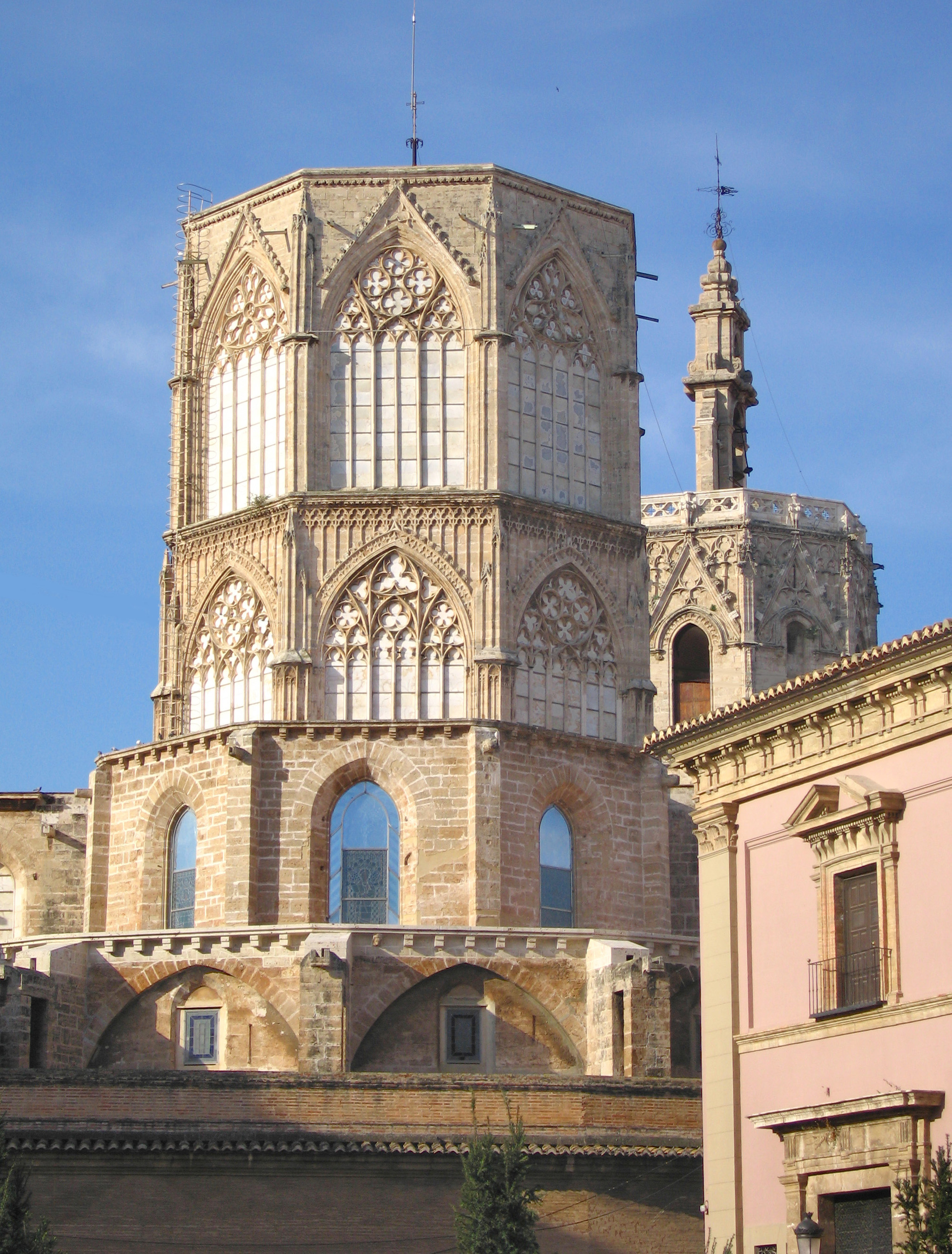
Dome

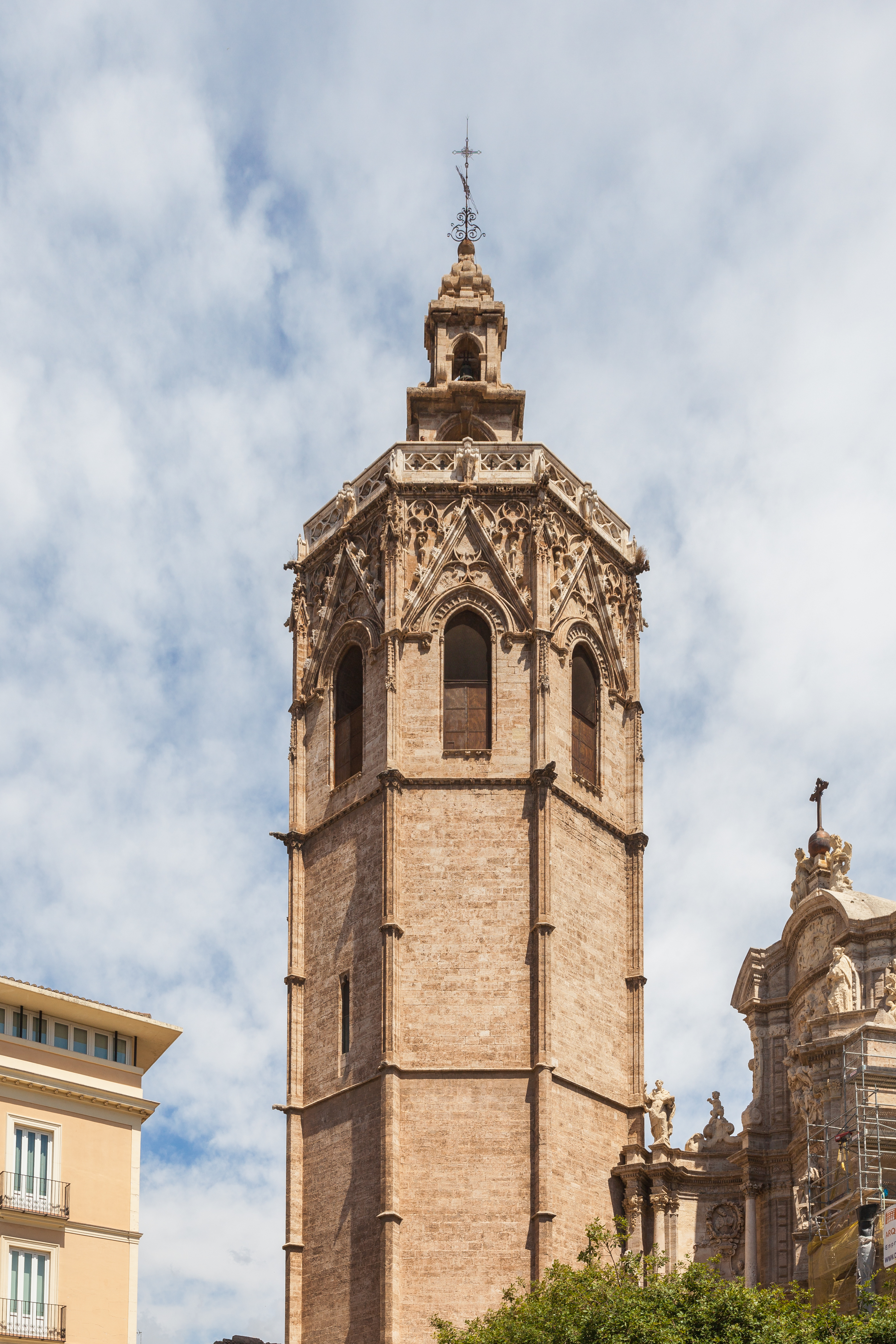
Bell Tower, Miguelete Tower

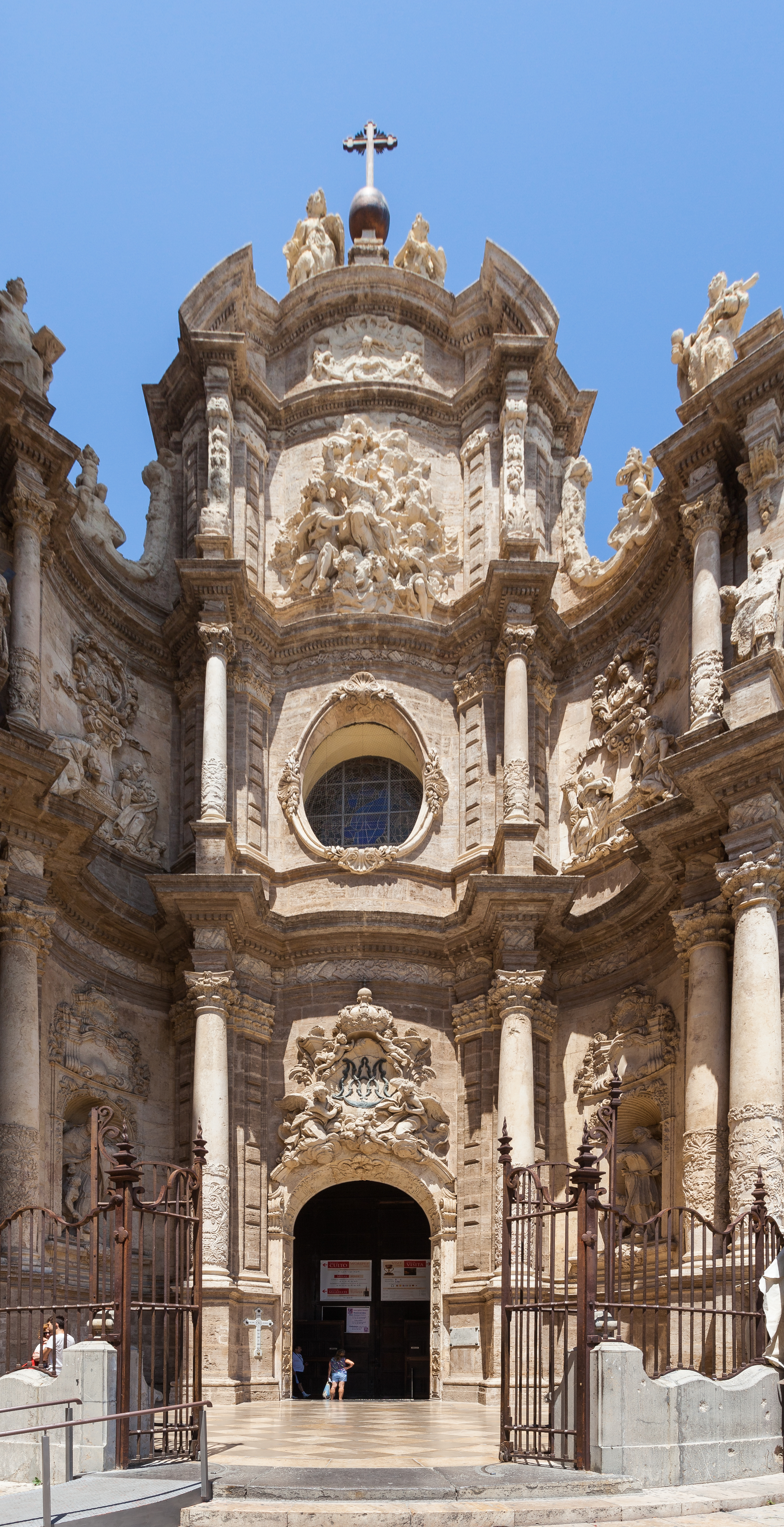
"Door of the Irons"

Between 1300 and 1350 the crossing was finished and its west side went up as far as the Baroque Apostles' Gate. Three out of the four sections of the naves and transepts were also built. The crossing tower (cimbori or eight-sided dome) was also begun.

The old chapter house (today Holy Grail Chapel, 1356–1369), where the canons met to discuss internal affairs, and the Miguelete Tower, known as El Miguelete in Castilian Spanish or Torre del Micalet in the Valencian language, were initially separate from the rest of the church, but in 1459 the architects Francesc Baldomar and Pere Compte expanded the nave and transepts in a further section, known as Arcada Nova, and finally joined both the chapter house and the Micalet with the rest of the cathedral, thereby attaining 94 metres (308 feet) in length and 53.65 metres (176.0 feet) in width.

The centuries of the Renaissance (15th–16th centuries) had little influence on the architecture of the cathedral but much more on its pictorial decoration, such as the one at the high altar, and sculptural decoration, such as the one in the Resurrection chapel.

During the Baroque period, the German Konrad Rudolf designed in 1703 the main door of the cathedral, known as the Iron gate due to the cast-iron fence that surrounds it. Because of the War of the Spanish Succession he could not finish it, and this task fell mainly to the sculptors Francisco Vergara and Ignacio Vergara. Its concave shape, which causes a unique and studied perspective effect, was distorted during the 20th century because of the demolition of some adjacent buildings (in what was formerly Saragossa Street) to expand the square (Plaza de la Reina).

A project to renew the building was launched during the last third of the 18th century, whose intention was to give a uniform neoclassical appearance to the church, different from the original Gothic style that was then considered a vulgar work in comparison. Works started in 1774, directed by the architect Antoni Gilabert Fornés. The reshuffle affected both constructive and ornamental elements: the pinnacles were removed outside, and the Gothic structure was masked by stucco and other pseudo-classical elements.

In 1931 the church was declared a historic and artistic landmark by the Spanish government, but during the Spanish Civil War it was burned, which meant that it lost part of its decorative elements. The choir, located in the central part, was dismantled in 1940 and moved to the bottom of the high altar.

Also in 1970, the Houses of Canons, a building attached to the chapels facing Micalet street, were demolished to give the cathedral back its previous appearance, and at the same time elements of little or no architectural value were removed.

The task of removing the Neoclassical elements in order to recover the original Gothic aspect was undertaken in 1972. The only Neoclassical elements spared were most of the ambulatory chapels, and some isolated elements such as the sculptures at the base of the dome (cimbori).

After several restorations, the cathedral is currently in a good state of preservation, especially after the exhibition of 1999 named The Image’s Light. It was once again declared a cultural landmark, this time by the regional Valencian government (Consell de la Generalitat Valenciana).

== Relics ==
A purported Holy Chalice, believed by many to be the true Holy Grail, is revered in one of the cathedral's chapels. It has been the official chalice for many popes, and has been used by many others, most recently by Pope Benedict XVI, on July 9, 2006. This chalice itself which may be dated to the 1st century, was given to the cathedral by king Alfonso V of Aragon in 1436.

== Discoveries ==
Off the Chapter Room, there is a circular chapel, behind the neoclassical lintel, comprising three closets which are filled with relics. Also one can see the paintings of the main altar which were hidden for several years. It was not until 1874 when the decision to clean the main altar was made, that these religious paintings appeared. At the front of Valencia Cathedral is the Barchilla Arch, which links it to the Archbishop's Palace. In the right side of this arch is a Roman stone which indicates that this arch had the official measures of this period. Finally, during excavations carried out to enlarge the cathedral, some remains of Roman buildings and streets were found.

== Music ==
Valencia Cathedral was of great importance for Iberian sacred music and had many notable composers as mestre de capella. The musicologist Josep Climent Barber (b. 1927) has conducted considerable research into the music of Valencia Cathedral.

=== Mestres de capella ===
Name	Period	work
Juan Ginés Pérez	1581–1595	Ululate, Pastores (fragment) Retrobem la nostra música
Ambrosio Cotes	1596–1600	Opera Varia. Gil-Tarrega, Victoria Musicae Label: La Ma De Guido - LMG 2053
Joan Baptista Comes	—	Magnificat 8 tono (fragment) Retrobem la nostra música
Francesc Navarro	1644–1650	—
Diego Pontac	1650–1653	—
Urbán de Vargas	1653–1656	—
Gracià Baban (c. 1620–1675)	1657–1675	—
Josep Prades i Gallent (d. 1757)	1728–1757	El Gran Padre de Familias (fragment) Espais de Llum Musical
Vicent Rodríguez Monllor (d. 1760)	—	—
Francesc Morera i Cots (1731–1793)	1768–1793	El misterio de la Fe (fragment) Espais de Llum Musical
Juan Cuevas Perales (1782–1855)	1833–1855	Gloria Patri (extract from Lauda Jerusalem) La Llum Musical Xativina
Passion in vernacular language	current period	Holy Friday Gospel (fragment) Seu Valentina

== See also ==
- Route of the Borgias
- Miguelete Tower
- Late medieval domes
