= Baban, Albania =

Baban
- Village
- Location within Albania
- Coordinates: 40°38′4″N 20°55′11″E
- Country: Albania
- County: Korçë
- Municipality: Devoll
- Administrative unit: Hoçisht

Population (2000)
  - Total: 502
- Time zone: UTC+1 (CET)
  - Summer (DST): UTC+2 (CEST)

Baban is a village in the Korçë County, Albania. At the 2015 local government reform it became part of the municipality Devoll.
