= Bavan-e Vosta =

Bavan-e Vosta بوان وسطي
- Village
- Location within Iran
- Coordinates: 30°01′24″N 51°39′20″E
- Country: Iran
- Province: Fars
- County: Mamasani
- Bakhsh: Central
- Rural District: Bakesh-e Yek

Population (2006)
  - Total: 26
- Time zone: UTC+3:30 (IRST)
  - Summer (DST): UTC+4:30 (IRDT)

Bavan-e Vosta (Persian: بوان وسطي, also Romanized as Bavān-e Vosţá; also known as Bavān-e Mīānī) is a village in Bakesh-e Yek Rural District, in the Central District of Mamasani County, Fars province, Iran. At the 2006 census, its population was 26, in 5 families.
