= Ginés Pérez de la Parra =

Spanish composer

Ginés Pérez de la Parra (c. 1548 – 25 November 1600), also known as Juan Ginés Pérez, was a Spanish composer during the Renaissance. He was born in Orihuela, a city in what is now the province of Alicante. His work and that of his contemporaries led to the formation of a stylistic school of music known as "valenciana."

Pérez spent five years of his life working as a musical composer in the Cathedral of Orihuela, directing a cappella music from 1581 to 1585. The music he composed was also used in many Spanish cathedrals, but the majority of his compositions remained incomplete. Today the largest collection of his work is held in Zaragosa.

Ululate, Pastores (fragment)
Retrobem la nostra música

== Media ==
- Luget Judea. Retrobem la nostra música, CD nº 20.
- Ululate, Pastores. Retrobem la nostra música, CD nº 20.
- Salve, Regina. Retrobem la nostra música, CD nº 20.

== Discography ==
- Tulerunt Dominum à 6, Luget Judea, Salve Regina à 5, Officium Defunctorum. Victoria Musicae, Joseph Gil-Tàrrega. Label: La Mà de Guido 2003
