= Col·legi Casp =

Jesuit school in Barcelona, Spain

Coordinates: 41°23′23.13″N 2°10′16.03″E

Col·legi Casp–Sagrat Cor de Jesús Casp College-Sacred Heart of Jesus
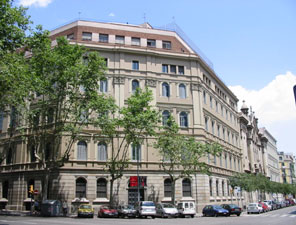
- Casp Street, Barcelona, Catalonia, Spain

Information
- Established: 1881; 145 years ago
- Gender: Coeducational
- Enrollment: 1,700
- Classes: Primary, compulsory secondary, and non-compulsory secondary (batxillerat)
- Affiliation: Jesuit (Catholic)
- Website: Col·legi Casp

Col·legi Casp–Sagrat Cor de Jesús (Catalan pronunciation: [kuˈlːɛʒi ˈkasp səˈɣɾat ˈkɔɾ ðə ʒəˈzus], in English "Casp College-Sacred Heart of Jesus"), also known as Jesuïtes de Casp, is a Jesuit school in Barcelona, Catalonia, Spain, founded in 1881. Its Catalan name refers to both the school's location on Casp Street (Carrer de Casp) and the attached church, the Església del Sagrat Cor de Jesús. Both the school and church are run by the "Casp Jesuits" (Jesuïtes de Casp).

== History ==
Col·legi Casp is the successor to two Jesuit schools in the city: Col·legi de Betlem, founded 1546, and Col·legi de Cordelles, given to the Jesuits in 1659. Both were situated on the Rambla dels Estudis and were open until the expulsion of the Jesuit order in 1767.

Col·legi Casp opened October 1, 1881, initially with 108 students. The political environment in Spain at the time had an effect on the school's growth. In 1932, it was converted into a municipal school due to the dissolution of the Society of Jesus, which returned in 1939. Col·legi Casp's enrollment increased soon after, and the school expanded into adjacent buildings.

In 1971, the school became a co-ed institution with its first female students. The next year it began offering Catalan courses and, in 1978, began teaching in Catalan. By the 1983–84 school year, the entire school had become co-ed. Currently, Col·legi Casp has more than 1,700 students of both sexes between the primary, compulsory secondary, and non-compulsory secondary (batxillerat) sections of the school. The Casp Jesuits have graduated around 25,000 students, many of whom have become well known in Catalan society. In 2007, Col·legi Casp received the Medal of Honor of Barcelona (Medalla d'Honor de Barcelona).

== Relations with other schools ==
Col·legi Casp's batxillerat section is very active with student exchange programs. Among its partner schools are:

- In Belgium:
  - Collège Saint-Michel in Brussels
- In France:
  - Ecole de Provence in Marseille
- In Canada:
  - Collège Jean-de-Brébeuf in Montreal, Quebec
- In the United States:
  - Brebeuf Jesuit Preparatory School in Indianapolis, Indiana
  - Loyola Academy near Chicago, Illinois
  - Magnificat High School near Cleveland, Ohio
  - St. Ignatius High School in Cleveland, Ohio
  - St. John's Jesuit High School in Toledo, Ohio
  - St. Ursula Academy in Cincinnati, Ohio
  - St. Xavier High School in Cincinnati, Ohio
  - Walsh Jesuit High School near Akron, Ohio
  - St. Ursula Academy (Toledo, Ohio) in Toledo, Ohio

In addition, the school's primary section participates in the Comenius programme.

== Notable alumni ==
- Iñaki Urdangarin, Duke of Palma de Mallorca – bronze medalist in handball at the 1996 and 2000 Summer Olympics
- Francesc Vendrell – Catalan diplomat
- Ignasi Barraquer – ophthalmologist known for his contributions to the advancement of cataract surgery
- Josep Maria de Sagarra – Catalan poet, novelist, playwright, journalist and translator
- Albert Guinovart – Catalan composer and pianist
- Jaume Padrós i Selma – Catalan physician and politician

== See also ==
- List of Jesuit sites
