= Baban-e Sardar Qasemkhan =

Baban-e Sardar Qasemkhan بابان سردارقاسم خان
- Village
- Location within Iran
- Coordinates: 34°30′47″N 46°36′50″E
- Country: Iran
- Province: Kermanshah
- County: Kermanshah
- Bakhsh: Kuzaran
- Rural District: Sanjabi

Population (2006)
  - Total: 320
- Time zone: UTC+3:30 (IRST)
  - Summer (DST): UTC+4:30 (IRDT)

Baban-e Sardar Qasemkhan (Persian: بابان سردارقاسم خان, also Romanized as Bābān-e Sardār Qāsemkhān; also known as Bābān Yāvar and Bāvān) is a village in Sanjabi Rural District, Kuzaran District, Kermanshah County, Kermanshah Province, Iran. At the 2006 census, its population was 320, in 65 families.
