= Paramythia executions =

1943 massacre of Greek civilians

- Location: Paramythia, Greece
- Date: 19–29 September 1943
- Target: Greek civilians
- Attack type: Executions, burning of villages
- Deaths: 201
- Perpetrators: Cham Albanian paramilitary, German 1st Mountain Division

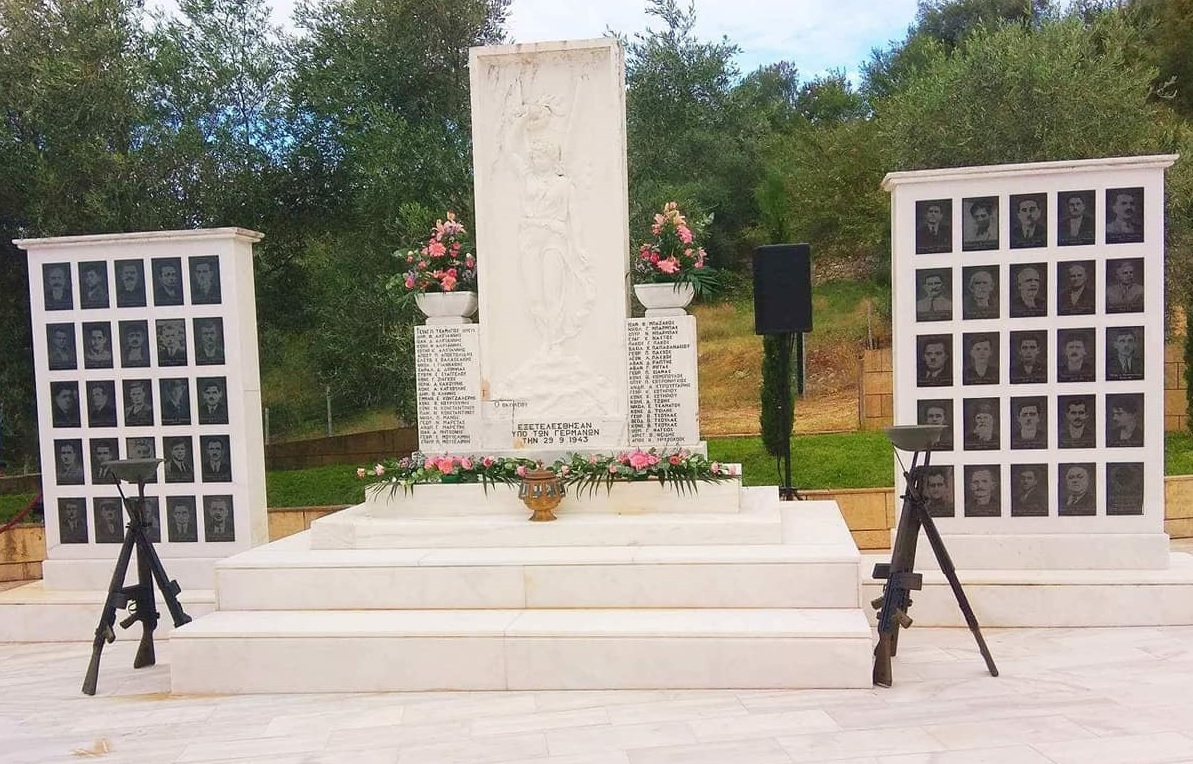
Monument in memory of the civilians shot by German and Albanian Nazi troops in Paramythia

The Paramythia executions, also known as the Paramythia massacre, was a mass execution and war crime perpetrated by members of Nazi Germany's 1st Mountain Division and the collaborating Muslim Cham Albanian militia in the town of Paramythia and its surrounding region, during the Axis occupation of Greece in World War II. Over the period of 19–29 September 1943, 201 Greek civilians were murdered – primarily the Greek community's representatives and intellectuals – and 19 municipalities in the region of Paramythia were destroyed. After the end of the war and the defeat of the Axis powers, a series of war crime trials condemned these actions, however no defendants were ever arrested and brought to trial, as they already had fled into Albania. The perpetrators were tried in absentia. At the Hostages Trial in Nuremberg in 1948, the American judges reached the decision that the executions of Paramythia were "plain murders".

== Background ==
The town of Paramythia was the administrative center of the Prefecture of Thesprotia in Greece before World War II. When the war broke out, it had a mixed population of approximately 3,000 Christian Greeks and 3,000 Muslim Cham Albanians.

Fascist Italian propaganda had adopted a pro-Albanian approach, promising that the region would become part of Great Albania when the war ended. As a result, the Muslim Cham community collaborated in large parts with the occupying Italian and later the German troops of the Axis powers, committing a number of crimes against the unarmed local Greek population. The occupation forces installed a local Cham administration in the town of Paramythia, with Xhemil Dino as local administrator of Thesprotia and as a representative of the Albanian government. Apart from the local Cham administration (Këshilla) and militia, a paramilitary organization named 'Kosla' was operating from July 1942.

== Anti-resistance activity and first wave of executions ==
Due to increased guerilla activity in the surrounding region, in September 1943, German Lt. Colonel Josef Remold ordered the initiation of several scouting missions consisting of combined German-Cham Albanian groups.

On 18 September, a group of 60 villagers was stopped by a patrol and were interrogated. Nine of them (one woman and eight men) were considered members of the resistance. The next day they were executed in front of the town's elementary school. On 20 September, the scouting missions intensified and on several occasions engaged EDES units in combat. Remold himself remarked that the Cham units were very effective and "with their knowledge of the surrounding area, they have proved their value in the scouting missions".

On 24 September, a patrol team consisting of five German soldiers was ambushed, possibly by Greek guerillas. The next day their bodies were found in a condition that made recognition difficult. A rumor spread that the team was accompanied by Muslim Chams, who committed the murders in order to accuse the Greeks and to initiate a major pogrom over the following days. However, according to post-war testimonies this possibility has not been proven.

== Reprisals ==
On 27 September, combined German and Cham forces launched a large-scale operation, burning and destroying villages north of Paramythia, including Eleftherochori, Seliani, Semelika, and Aghios Nikolaos, and killing 50 Greek villagers in the process. In this operation the Cham contingent numbered 150 men, and according to German Major Stöckert, "performed very well".

However, this operation was not enough. On the eve of 27 September, group of Cham Albanian militiamen investigated almost every home in Paramythia. Cham militia officer Mazar Dino, based on a list of names in his possession, arrested 53 inhabitants and locked them in the town's elementary school to await execution.

Local bishop Dorotheos travelled to Ioannina to try to convince the Nazi commander, General Hubert Lanz, not to commit the executions.

== Execution of the captives ==
The brothers Mazar and Nuri Dino, who had orchestrated the killings to get rid of the Greek community's leaders and intellectuals, were aware of Dorotheos' intention and acted immediately. On 29 September, at midnight, the prisoners were taken to the execution site on the outskirts of town. However, four prisoners were released. According to German sergeant Helmut Götte, who was part of the firing squad:

The hostages were ordered to leave the school and to line up. A translator read them each person's name that would be executed. They made a step forward. We had to move them to the execution site, out of Paramythia. The graves were already opened and in front of them they had to stay. The execution was performed with carbines at a distance of 5–6 meters. There were no Coup de grâce.

According to Götte's post-war testimony, Cham Albanians were part of the firing squad. Although there were reports that the corpses were looted for jewellery and money, Götte denied it. According to another German who was part of the firing squad, the relatives were immediately ordered to bury the bodies after the executions.

The victims were people from all walks of life, but most of them were prominent personalities of the Greek community of Paramythia. Among them were a priest, a doctor, five teachers, the school's director, and most of the local entrepreneurs.

== Trials ==
In the post-war years, a number of war crimes trials concerning the Axis occupation were held in Greece. However, not a single defendant was arrested or imprisoned for the Paramythia executions, as the perpetrators had already fled the country. At the Nuremberg trials, General Hubert Lanz reported that the executions and the reprisal missions were part of "war regulations", yet he admitted utter ignorance about the executions in Paramythia. In 1948 the Greek National Bureau on War Crimes ordered juridical research on the crimes committed by Italians, Albanians, and Germans during the Axis occupation. Two days later, the immediate arrest of the defendants was ordered. Because all of the defendants were abroad, it is unknown if the Greek Foreign Ministry initiated the needed diplomatic procedure. In the 1948 Hostages Trial in Nuremberg, the American judges called the executions in Paramythia "plain murder".

== Sources ==
- Meyer, Hermann Frank (2008). Blutiges Edelweiß: Die 1. Gebirgs-division im zweiten Weltkrieg [Bloodstained Edelweiss. The 1st Mountain-Division in WWII] (in German). Ch. Links Verlag. ISBN 978-3-86153-447-1.

== See also ==
- German war crimes
- War crimes of the Wehrmacht
- Laws of war
