= Expulsion of Cham Albanians =

20th century forced migration of Cham Albanians from Greece

Expulsion of the Cham Albanians
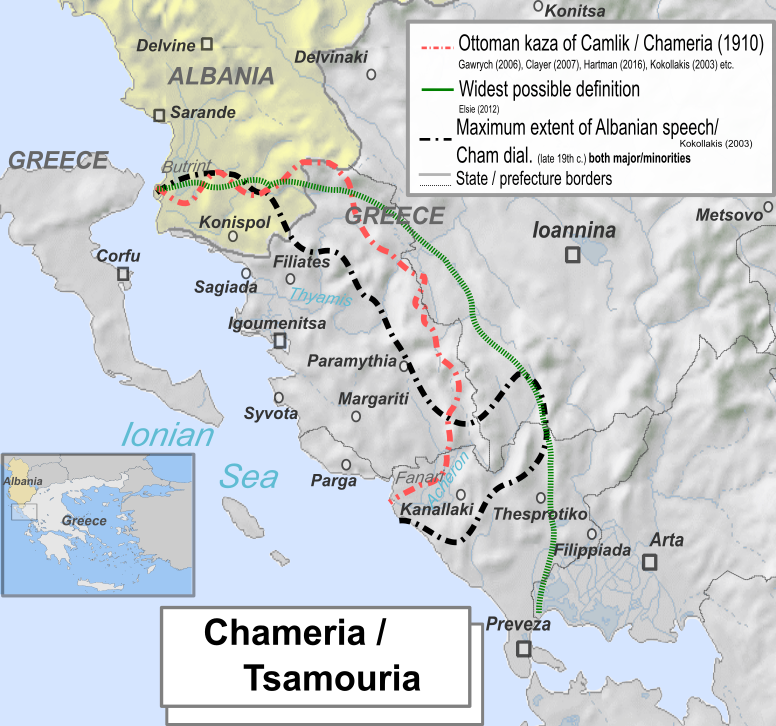
- Location: Thesprotia Prefecture
- Date: 1944–1945
- Target: Cham Albanians
- Attack type: Forced migration, ethnic cleansing, massacres, rape
- Deaths: Total: 1,200–5,000: Killed: 1,200–2,877; Hunger and epidemics: Up to 2,500 according to Albanian sources
- Victims: Ethnic Cleansing: 14,000–35,000 Muslim Chams expelled from the region; 475 women raped
- Perpetrators: Elements of EDES, Allies of WWII, elements of ELAS, individual peasants

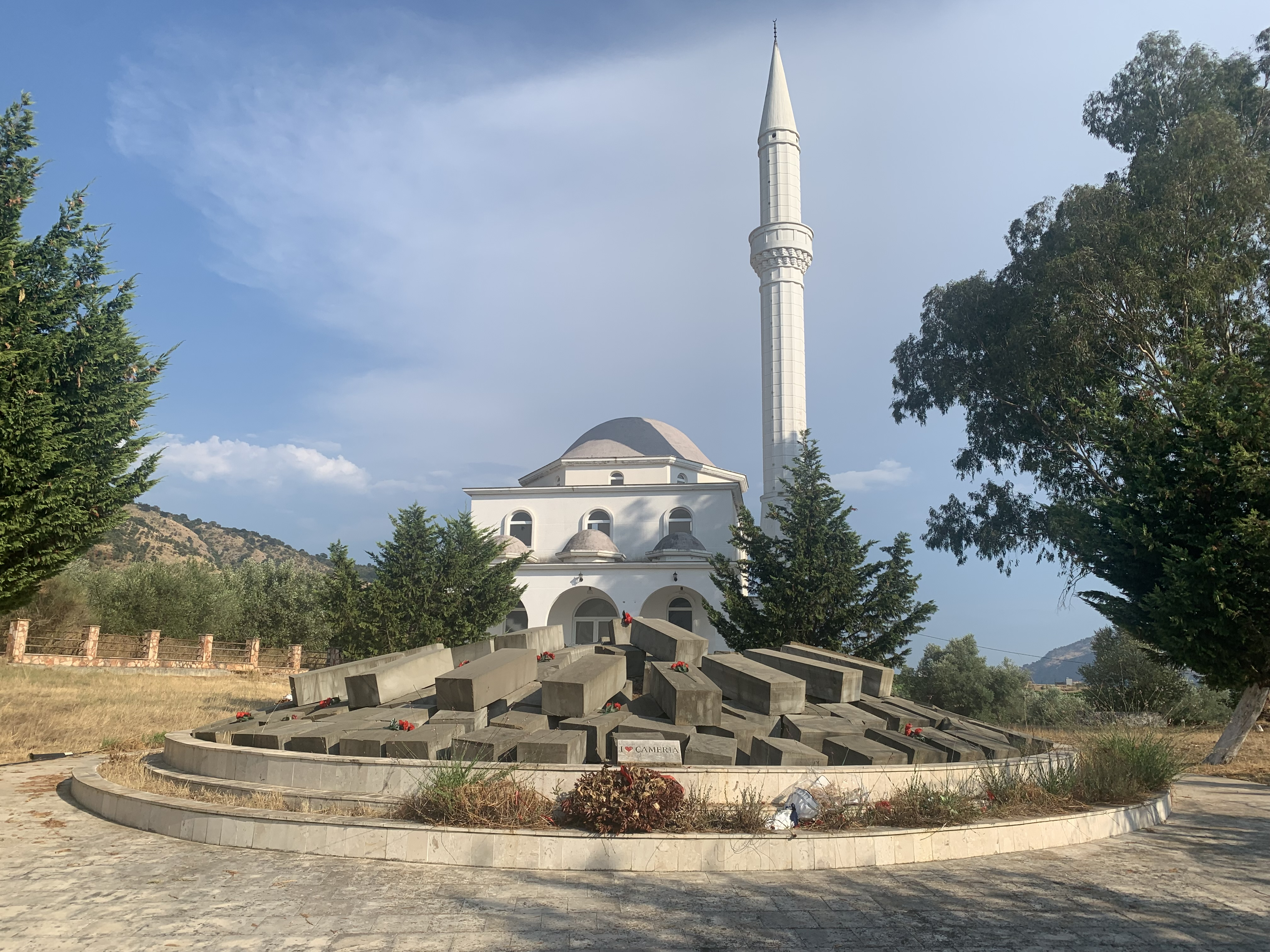
The "Trëndafilat e Çamërisë" Monumental Cemetery in Kllogjer, Konispol, dedicated to the expulsion of Cham Albanians during 1944–1945.

The expulsion of Cham Albanians from Greece was the forced migration and ethnic cleansing of thousands of Cham Albanians from settlements of Chameria in Thesprotia, Greece after the Second World War to Albania, at the hands of elements of the Greek Resistance: the National Republican Greek League (EDES) (1944) and EDES veteran resistance fighters (1945). The causes of the expulsion remain a matter of debate among historians. The estimated number of Cham Albanians expelled from Epirus mostly to Albania varies from 14,000 to 35,000.

In the late Ottoman period, tensions between the Muslim Chams and the local Greek Orthodox Christian population emerged through communal conflicts. The Cham Albanians were originally Christian Orthodox by religion, but converted to Islam during the latter years of the Ottoman occupation. These tensions continued during the Balkan Wars, when the region, then under Ottoman rule, became part of Greece. Before and during the interwar period, the Muslim Chams were not integrated into the Greek state, which adopted policies that aimed to drive them out of their territory, led to tensions between them. Unlike the Christian Albanians of Greece, the Muslim Cham Albanians were seen by Greek nationalists as an immediate threat to the state. Meanwhile, fascist Italian propaganda initiated in 1939 an aggressive pro-Albanian campaign for the annexation of the Greek region and the creation of a Greater Albanian state.

At the beginning of World War II, when the Greek state announced its full mobilization prior to the Italian invasion, Cham Albanians were alienated further by it, and were treated as a hostile population and experienced discrimination and oppression, while their community leaders were exiled. Subsequently, a part of the Muslim Cham population collaborated with the Axis troops, with the degree being a matter of academic debate. They did so either by providing indirect support (guides, local connections, informants etc.) or by being recruited as Axis troops and armed irregulars. The latter cases were responsible for atrocities against the local Greek populace. Overall, the Muslim Chams were sympathetic to Axis forces during the war and benefited from the Axis occupation of Greece. These armed Cham collaborators displayed extreme cruelty toward the Greek population and indulged in massacres and lootings. Armed Cham collaboration units actively participated in Nazi operations that resulted in the murder of more than 1,200 Greek villagers between July and September 1943, and, in January 1944, in the murder of 600 people on the Albanian side of the border. There were also moderate elements within the Muslim Cham community who opposed hatred of their Greek neighbors, including Albanian beys and religious leaders. A limited number of Muslim Chams enlisted in Albanian and Greek resistance units in the last stages of World War II.

Collaboration with the Axis fueled resentment by the Greek side and in the aftermath of World War II, despite the assurances of the EDES guerrillas, most of the Muslim Cham community fled, or were forced to flee, to Albania. The collaboration served as a justification for their expulsion that was also the outcome of Greek totalitarian regime's policy embedded in the prevailing nationalistic ideology of the interwar period. In the process between 200 and 300 Chams were massacred by EDES forces in various settlements between March and May 1945, while over 1,200 were murdered in total. Some Albanian sources increase this number to c. 2,000. However, atrocities were not encouraged by the EDES leadership and the British mission, but both were unable to prevent them. Generally, violent incidents against Muslim Cham civilians were severely limited because the EDES leadership managed to impose discipline on its subordinate members. In 1945–1946, a special collaborator's court in Greece condemned a total of 2,109 Cham Albanians in absentia for collaboration with the Axis powers and war crimes. Several local Greek notables promised safe passage and offered to host all those Chams who would abandon the Nazi side. As such, a few hundred Muslim Chams stayed in Greece.

Moreover, according to Albanian sources, an additional 2,500 Muslim Cham refugees lost their lives through starvation and epidemics on their way to Albania. After settling in the People's Republic of Albania and the ruling Party of Labour of Albania under Enver Hoxha did not treat them as victims, but took a very distrustful view towards them and proceeded with arrests and exiles. The Cham Albanians were labelled as "reactionaries", "murderers of the Greeks" and "collaborators of the occupation forces", and suffered a certain degree of persecution within Albania, because their elites were traditionally rich landlords, they had collaborated with the Axis forces and they had been involved in anti-communist activities.

== Background ==
=== Ottoman period ===
Albanian presence in the area of Chameria, in coastal parts of Epirus, is recorded since at least the 13th century. A Venetian document cites an Albanian population inhabiting the area opposite the island of Corfu in 1210, while the first appearance of Albanians within the Despotate of Epirus is recorded in Byzantine sources as nomads. The wars of the eighteenth and early nineteenth centuries between Russia and the Ottoman Empire negatively impacted the region. Increased conversions to Islam followed, often forced, such as those of 25 villages in 1739 which are located in current day Thesprotia prefecture. During the Ottoman period members of the Cham community owned most large farmlands in the region.

There is no evidence that Albanian national ideologies had strong support among the local Muslims in the late Ottoman period. On the other hand, the local Orthodox Albanian speaking population, as well as the rest of the Orthodox community, remained Greek-oriented and identified themselves as Greeks. For the Greek state, however, the possibility of Orthodox Albanian speakers being recruited into the ranks of Albanian nationalists was a source of constant anxiety. However, despite efforts of state and national activists the local population was not nationalised in this period. Thus Kyrios Nitsos, a Greek educationalist in 1909 noted that local Orthodox Albanian speakers did not refer to themselves as Greek yet instead as Kaur which connoted Christian and did not find the term insulting, while Muslim Albanian speakers identified themselves as Muslims or Turks. In late Ottoman period within the Balkans the terms "Muslim" and "Turk" became synonymous and Albanians were conferred and received the term "Turk" while having preferences to distance themselves from ethnic Turks.

In the early 20th century Muslims constituted a little over one-third of the total population of Thesprotia, most of them were Albanian speakers. On the other hand, the Orthodox community, or the "Greeks", as known to contemporary Ottoman classification were Greek, Albanian and Aromanian speakers: In the highlands of Mourgana and Souli there were mostly Greek speakers, while in the lowlands of Margariti, Igoumenitsa and Paramithia Albanian speakers.

In January 1907 a secret agreement was signed between Ismail Qemali, a leader of the then Albanian national movement, and the Greek government which concerned the possibility of an alliance against the Ottoman Empire. According to this, the two sides agreed that the future Greek-Albanian boundary should be located on the Acroceraunian mountains, thus leaving Chameria to Greece. Qemali's reasons for closer ties with Greece during this time was to thwart Bulgarian ambitions in the wider Balkans region and gain support for Albanian independence. The following years the Muslim Albanians of the sanjak of Preveza, especially the large landowners and the Ottoman state employees, were persecuting the Christian element in cooperation with the Ottomans. Moreover, the Ottomans continued to install an unknown number of Muslim Albanians in the sanjak as part of their resettlement policy.

=== Balkan Wars (1912–1913) ===
On 17 October, the Greek side attempted to approach the local Muslim representatives in order to discuss the possibility of a Greek-Albanian alliance. Only some Albanian beys of Margariti were willing to accept a Greek rule. Muslim Chams were not keen to fight on the side of the Ottoman army, but already from autumn 1912 formed armed bands and raided the entire area as far north as Pogoni. As a result, hundreds of Greek villagers were forced to escape to nearby Corfu and Arta. Thus, the members of the Muslim community were treated as de facto enemies by the Greek state. Later, in January 1913, Greek irregulars began to respond to this situation. Between 72 and 78 Muslim Cham notables from Paramythia were executed by a Greek army irregular unit during this time. Cham reports that some Albanian notables of Chameria were persecuted and killed by the Greek authorities had been officially refuted by the Greek government. Thus, several local conflicts took place between local Muslim and Christian Albanian speakers, as they have been recruited by the Ottoman and Greek armies respectively. In the ensuing war against the Greek army, many of the Muslim Chams had formed irregular armed units and had burned Greek inhabited settlements in the area of Paramythia, Fanari and Filiates. As a response to this activity Greek guerrilla units were organized in the region latter in 1913. Thus, village burnings were committed by both sides. Occurrences of atrocities perpetrated by Greek forces within the region were recorded mainly by the Albanian side, whereas those events were noted only indirectly, though clearly by Greek government officials. During the Balkan Wars, Chameria, as the whole region of Epirus, came under Greek control.

=== World War I and Interwar (1914–1940) ===
The region's geographical proximity to the Albania state became a serious concern for the Greek state, and consequently, every pro-Albanian movement within Chameria had to be eliminated by all means. Nevertheless, nationalist ideologies were adopted only by a minority of the Cham community. Even this minority was divided between pro-republicans and pro-royalist.

During and immediately after World War I, Muslim Albanians were pressured to leave Chameria through various intimidation tactics, both subtle and violent. The population was harassed and hundreds of young men were deported to various camps by Paramilitary bands. When Italian troops replaced the Greek administration with an Albanian one in 1917 in parts of Chameria, Albanians retaliated due to previous oppression by plundering Greek villages. Muslim Chams were counted as a religious minority, and some of them were transferred to Turkey, during the 1923 population exchange, although they were not officially part of it, while their property was alienated by the Greek government. Muslims in general were seen as backwards and were excluded "from the concept of the Greek nation". During the interwar period, the numbers of Muslim Chams declined and estimates to their numbers varied between 22,000 in official reports, while the census registered 17,000 in 1928 and other Greek government sources gave 19,000 as the number in 1932. Although the relationship between Cham Albanians and the Greek state improved during the early 1930s, things worsened again under the dictatorship of Ioannis Metaxas. Under the Metaxas regime (1936–1940), the gendarmerie used increased intimidation methods toward the Cham populace through imprisonments, arbitrary arrests, violence, beatings, house searches for discovery of weapons and the prohibition of Albanian language, books and newspapers. In 1928, Cham protests were brought to the League of Nations, however the Cham demands were ignored and the Greek positions were accepted instead. The League of Nations also rejected Albanian demands about property issues and the recognition of the Cham minority as a distinct minority. During the 1930s Albanian and Italian irredentist efforts were intensified for the incorporation of the region into Albania. In April 1939 a committee of Cham representative called Fascist Italy to annex the region and to hand it over to Albania.

== World War II ==
=== Cham involvement in the invasion against Greece ===
==== Italian policy calling for Cham irredentism ====
Following the Italian invasion of Albania, the Albanian Kingdom became a protectorate of the Kingdom of Italy. The Italians, especially governor Francesco Jacomoni, used the Cham issue as a means to rally Albanian support. Although in the event, Albanian enthusiasm for the "liberation of Chameria" was muted, Jacomoni sent repeated over-optimistic reports to Rome on Albanian support. As the possibility of an Italian attack on Greece drew nearer, he began arming Albanian irregular bands to use against Greece.

As the final excuse for the start of the Greco-Italian War, Jacomoni used the killing of Daut Hoxha, a Cham Albanian, whose headless body was discovered near the village of Vrina in June 1940. It was alleged by the Italian-controlled government in Tirana that he had been murdered by Greek secret agents. Hoxha was a notorious bandit killed in a fight over some sheep with two shepherds and according to some other specific works Hoxha was a military leader of the Cham struggle during the Interwar years, leading to him branded as a bandit by the Greek government. From June of that same year up to the eve of the war, due to the instigation of Albanian and Italian propaganda, many Chams had secretly crossed the borders in order to compose armed groups, which were to side with the Italians. Their numbers are estimated of about 2,000 to 3,000 men. Adding to them in the following months the Italians urgently started organizing several thousand local Albanians volunteers to participate on the "liberation of Chamuria" creating an army equivalent to a full division of 9 battalions; 4 blackshirt battalions – Tirana, Korçë and Vlorë, Shkodër, 2 infantry battalions – Gramos and Dajti, 2 volunteer battalions – Tomori and Barabosi, one battery corps – Drin. All of them eventually took part in the invasion to Greece at 28 October 1940 (see Greco-Italian War) under the XXV Italian Army Corps which after the incorporation of the Albanian units renamed to "Chamuria Army Corps" under General C. Rossi, although with poor performance.

==== Cham participation in the Italian invasion ====
In October 1940, 1800 Cham conscripts were disarmed and put to work on local roads, and in the following months all Albanian males not called up were deported to camps or to island exile.

The Greco–Italian War started with the Italian military forces launching an invasion of Greece from Albanian territory. The invasion force included several hundred native Albanian and Chams in blackshirt battalions attached to the Italian army. Their performance however was distinctly lackluster, as most Albanians, poorly motivated, either deserted or defected. Indeed, the Italian commanders, including Mussolini, would later use the Albanians as scapegoats for the Italian failure.

During 28 October – 14 November while the Italian army made a short advance and briefly took brief control of part of Thesprotia, bands of Cham Albanians raided several villages and burned a number of towns, including Paramythia, Filiates, Sagiada and Igoumenitsa, while local Greek notables have been killed. In the case of Filiates the sacking and destruction by Albanian irregulars in which Italian soldiers also participated compelled the Italian command to promulgate an order against those outrages.

=== Collaboration ===
The Axis forces adopted a pro-Albanian policy, promising that the region would become part of a Greater Albania when the war ends. Under these circumstances, as Italy managed to control most of Greece after the German invasion. Most Cham did not collaborate with Axis forces; many even fought in Cham battalions against the fascist occupiers, Italians and Germans, while a few Cham Albanians formed armed groups and provided active support to the occupation forces. These armed bands under the leadership of gendarmerie officers Nuri and Mazar Dino participated in the Axis operations (village burnings, murders, executions) and committed a number of crimes in both Greece and Albania. It seems that the leaders of the Cham community with the support of the German Wehrmacht units stationed in the region implemented ethnic cleansing policies that aimed to change the local demographic composition with the removal of the Christian population and the final incorporation of the region to Albania. However, it seems that local beys (most of them were already part of the Albanian nationalistic and partly collaborationist group Balli Kombëtar) and the mufti did not support such actions.

Thus, in the summer of 1943, armed Cham collaborator units actively participated in the Nazi operations Augustus that resulted in the murder of 600 Greek villagers and the destruction of 70 villages. In September 1943, similar Cham activity resulted in the murder of 201 civilians in the region of Paramythia and Fanari and the destruction of 19 settlements. On one occasion, the Cham administration managed to exterminate the Greek notables of Paramythia. Active collaboration wasn't limited on the Greek side of the border. Thus, in January 1944, Cham units were also active in Albania together with Nazi German forces, as a result, 600 people were murdered in the region of Konispol. Though the wider Muslim Cham population was sympathetic to the Axis forces during the war, many were not active collaborators apart from those mainly recruited as Axis troops and armed irregulars.

Although the Italians wanted to annex Chameria to Albania, the Germans vetoed the proposal, most probably due to the fact that Epirus periphery was inhabited by a vast majority by Greeks. An Albanian High Commissioner, Xhemil Dino, was appointed, but his authority was limited, and for the duration of the Occupation, the area remained under direct control from the occupational military authorities. The Nazi German command faced the reality that "all ‘national’ and ‘leftist’ partisan groups consisted of Greeks, unlike the Chams who almost entirely supported the Germans". On 10 August 1943, the National Republican Greek League (EDES) and the Cham Balli Kombëtar (BK) held a meeting in Parga, attended by representatives of the two organizations including Mazar Dino. EDES asked for the disarmament of the Cham units and for their activity to pass under EDES command. These demands were met with refusal by the Cham BK.

=== Resistance ===
The fact the Cham Albanians collaborated with the Axis worried the two major resistance organizations in the region, the right wing National Republican Greek League (EDES) and the left Greek People's Liberation Army (EAM). Cham units engaged in combat operations against both organizations and especially against the EDES. From March 1943 the ELAS bands invited various Muslim Cham villages to join the resistance, but the results were disappointing. They were unable to recruit more than 30, but most of them deserted ELAS the following winter. Only at the end of the war, in May 1944, a mixed ELAS battalion the IV Ali Demi battalion (Albanian: Batalioni Ali Demi) was formed. It was named after a Cham Albanian who was killed in Vlora fighting against the Germans. According to a Cham report of 1945 it consisted of 460 men, some of whom were members of the Cham minority. However, it had not the opportunity to make any significant contribution against the Germans.

On 15 June 1943 the Albanian National Liberation Front formed the ethnically mixed (consisting of Albanians from Albania, Greeks from Albania and Cham Albanians) Chameria battalion (Albanian: Batalioni Çamëria), during the meeting of the Regional Committee of the National Anti-fascist Liberation Army in Konispol. At the end of 1943 the men of this ethnically mixed battalion fought against the Germans in Konispol. They later were supported by 1,000 Albanian collaborators under the Cham leader Nuri Dino (Nuri Dino battalion Albanian: Batalioni Nuri Dino). Soon after this battle, Haki Rushit (one of the leaders of the Chameria battalion) defected to the nationalist collaborators of the Balli Kompetar. EDES also approached the Cham community in 1943, and ordered local EDES commanders to avoid provoking the Chams:

we [EDES] are currently trying to disrupt the collaboration between the Italian and the Muslims whose morale has completely plummeted and are currently pleading for an alliance with us... it is imperative that you desist from provoking them. You should inform all the guerrillas and the civilian population about this and make them predisposed toward accepting this"

The British Military Mission attempted to mediate an agreement between the resistance groups and the Cham community after the Italian capitulation, but that was rejected by the Muslim notables. The capitulation of Italians and the arrival of Germans put an end to the negotiations between Chams and Greek resistance groups. The Germans tried to win over the Muslim Chams by offering money, supplies, guns, uniforms and promising a union with Albania in the event of an Axis victory. Approximately 300 Chams took part in a series of anti-guerrilla sweeps in Thesprotia and within four days (in August 1943), 150 people were murdered, while hundreds more were taken hostage and transported to prison camps in Ioannina. The operations continued well into the autumn when several villages were burned by a joint Cham-German force, culminating in the executions of 49 notables of Paramithia as reprisals for a guerrilla attack. By the end of 1943, the presence of the Germans also encouraged the Chams to organise a parallel state, which progressively replaced the Greek authorities across the region. A Muslim committee was elected, that would serve as a de facto civilian authority in the Paramithia region. In early 1944 the Albanian notables appointed their own council presidents, militia men and rural guards, and imposed a compulsory tax on the agricultural products and any transactions of the Greek peasants. They harassed in many ways the Christian notables and peasants who resisted, and these efforts had a detrimental effect on the Greek population. This atmosphere against the local Greeks who had suffered under Germans, Italians and Chams, led to an explosive polarization which would have constrained any motivation for joint Greek-Cham resistance.

== Expulsion ==
=== First expulsion by EDES ===
During the summer of 1944, the right-wing head of the National Republican Greek League (EDES), Napoleon Zervas, asked the Cham Albanians to join EDES, but their response was negative. After that and in accordance to orders given specifically to EDES by the Allied forces to push them out of the area, fierce fighting occurred between the two sides. In particular, Cham Albanian units were fighting together with the German army in all conflicts that occurred in Thesprotia: from the end of June 1944 until the German withdrawal.

According to British reports, the Cham collaborationist bands managed to flee to Albania with all of their equipment, together with a half million stolen cattle as well as 3,000 horses, leaving only the elderly members of the community behind. On 18 June 1944, EDES forces with Allied support launched an attack on Paramythia. After short-term conflict against a combined Cham-German garrison, the town was finally under Allied command. Soon after, violent reprisals were carried out against the town's Muslim community, which was considered responsible for the massacre of September 1943.

The advance was carried out in two phases: in July and August with the participation of EDES Tenth Division and the local Greek peasants, eager to gain revenge for the burning of their own homes. On 27 June 1944, during the first operation by EDES forces, the most infamous massacre of Muslim Chams occurred in the district of Paramythia. The total number of the Cham Albanians killed in the town, as well as in similar incidents in Karvounari, Parga, Trikoryfo (ex-Spatari), Filiates and the surrounding settlements of Paramythia are estimated from 300-600; men, women and children. Reports of rapes and torture were recorded as well. On 28 June 1944, EDES entered Parga and killed 52 Albanians. The following month the left wing National Liberation Front (EAM) arrested 40 local Muslim Albanians in Parga and executed them.

Some British officers described it as "a most disgraceful affair involving an orgy of revenge with the local guerrillas looting and wantonly destroying everything". British Foreign Office reported that "The bishop of Paramythia joined in the searching of houses for booty and came out of one house to find his already heavily laden mule had been meanwhile stripped by some andartes". On the other hand, Colonel Christopher Montague Woodhouse, 5th Baron Terrington, who was present in the area at the time, in his "Note on the Chams" official military report of 16 October 1945, stated that the Chams "deserved what they got" and wrote a brief description of the situation which led to the events, the events themselves, as well as his thoughts on them: "In 1941-3 they collaborated with Italians, making the organization of guerrilla resistance in that area difficult. I never heard of any of them taking part in any resistance against enemy. Zervas encouraged by the Allied Mission under myself, chased them out of their homes in 1944 in order to facilitate operations against the enemy. They mostly took refuge in Albania, where they were not popular either. Their eviction from Greece was bloodily carried out, owing the usual vendetta spirit, which was fed by many brutalities committed by the Chams in league with the Italians [...] The Chams deserved what they got, but Zervas' methods were pretty bad – or rather his subordinate officers got out of hand".

Some of the EDES units, in particular the regiments of Agoros and Galanis, refrained from looting and tried to limit the activity of the undisciplined groups, thus arresting a number of fellow resistance fighters in the process. Indeed, atrocities were not encouraged by the EDES leadership and the British mission, but both were unable to prevent this turn of events, as a great number of low rank officers and civilians were eager to take revenge. Elements of the left wing ELAS resistance were also involved in killings against Muslim Chams, in one occasion ELAS officer Thanasis Giohalas arrested and executed 40 Muslims in Parga. The remaining women and children were saved after EDES fighters managed to scatter the ELAS units and executed Giohalas. In the following months, German and Cham units attempted to retake Paramythia, but they were unsuccessful. At 17–18 August a Nazi-Cham Albanian force was defeated by the EDES resistance fighters at the Battle of Menina. After this battle the Cham community crossed the border and fled en masse to Albania.

EDES for a second time invited the Cham representatives to abandon their support to the Germans and hand over their weapons. This appeal was accompanied by similar initiatives of the Allied mission but the Cham response was again negative. On the other hand, the Cham community under their autonomous administration was determined to organize its armed defence against the advancing forces of EDES and armed all their male population of recruiting age (from 16 to 60 years old). In early August 1944 the Cham opposition was quickly overcome and the local Albanian communities began to cross the border and settled to Albanian territory. Those Chams that remained in Filiates in order to organize the defence against EDES were easily defeated. They were imprisoned, tried and executed the following day. However, their leaders, brothers Mazar and Nuri Dino, managed to flee to Albanian territory together with the retreating Germans. As noted by U.S. intelligence a large number of Chams moved to Albania with vehicles of the German army during its withdrawal.

=== Involvement in the Greek Civil War, repatriation by ELAS and final expulsion ===
Towards the end of the Greek occupation, the communist-controlled ELAS, having limited people's support in the Epirus region due to the right-wing EDES dominance in the area and in preparation of taking up the country's control after the German withdrawal from Greece, turned to the Chams for conscription. Seeing the omens several hundred Muslim Chams enlisted in its ranks. With the German withdrawal and the start of the Greek civil war, local ELAS forces with the participation of those Chams volunteers, aided with ELAS forces from the central Greece, attacked EDES in Epirus and succeeded to take the control in the Thesprotia region in late 1944 forcing EDES to leave in Corfu.

As a result of the ELAS victory, in January – February 1945, about four to five thousand Albanians returned to their homes from Albania, mainly in the border areas of Filiates and Sagiada. But after the final defeat of ELAS during the battle of Athens and its capitulation (see Varkiza Agreement), EDES quickly regained control of the region, eager to take revenge for the Cham's participation in the attack against its forces.

The expulsion of the rest of the community was completed by a massacre of Chams in Filliates in March 1945, carried out by EDES veterans under Zotos and groups of armed civilians. Thus, Col. Zotos, a loose paramilitary grouping of EDES veteran guerrillas and local men went on a rampage. In the worst massacre, at the town of Filiates, on 13 March, some sixty to seventy Chams were killed. Many of the Cham villages were burned and the remaining inhabitants fled across the border into Albania. However, there was no link between the perpetrators of the 1945 events and the EDES leadership, as well as the Greek administration of that time.

The incident came under an investigation of the Greek army four years later during the second circle of the Greek Civil War, in which time, the by-then communist Albania was actively helping the communist DSE army in its second armed confrontation to win the country's control, concluding that no crimes took place. At this time, Col. Zotos himself was part of the Epiros High Command of the Army, something that apparently played a role to the resulted decision. The active involvement of Albania in the internal affairs in Greece in that period and the anomalous political situation also played a role in the disguise of the case.

After the Albanian communist government gave compulsory Albanian citizenship to the Chams, the Greek government confiscated their properties (both of those who collaborated with the Nazis and those who did not) and permitted Greeks to settle in the area. After the war, only 117 Muslim Cham Albanians were left in Greece.

The exact number of Cham Albanians who were expelled mainly to Albania, and to a lesser extent Turkey, is unknown. Mark Mazower and Victor Roudometof state that they numbered about 18,000 in 1944 and 4,000–5,000 in 1945. while Miranda Vickers says that they were 35,000 that fled into Albania and Turkey. Chameria Association claims that Cham Albanians that left were 35,000, from whom, 28,000 left to Albania and the rest to Turkey. Today, most Chams live in Turkey as well as in Albania. Those of the Orthodox faith are considered Greeks by the Greek government.

== Aftermath ==
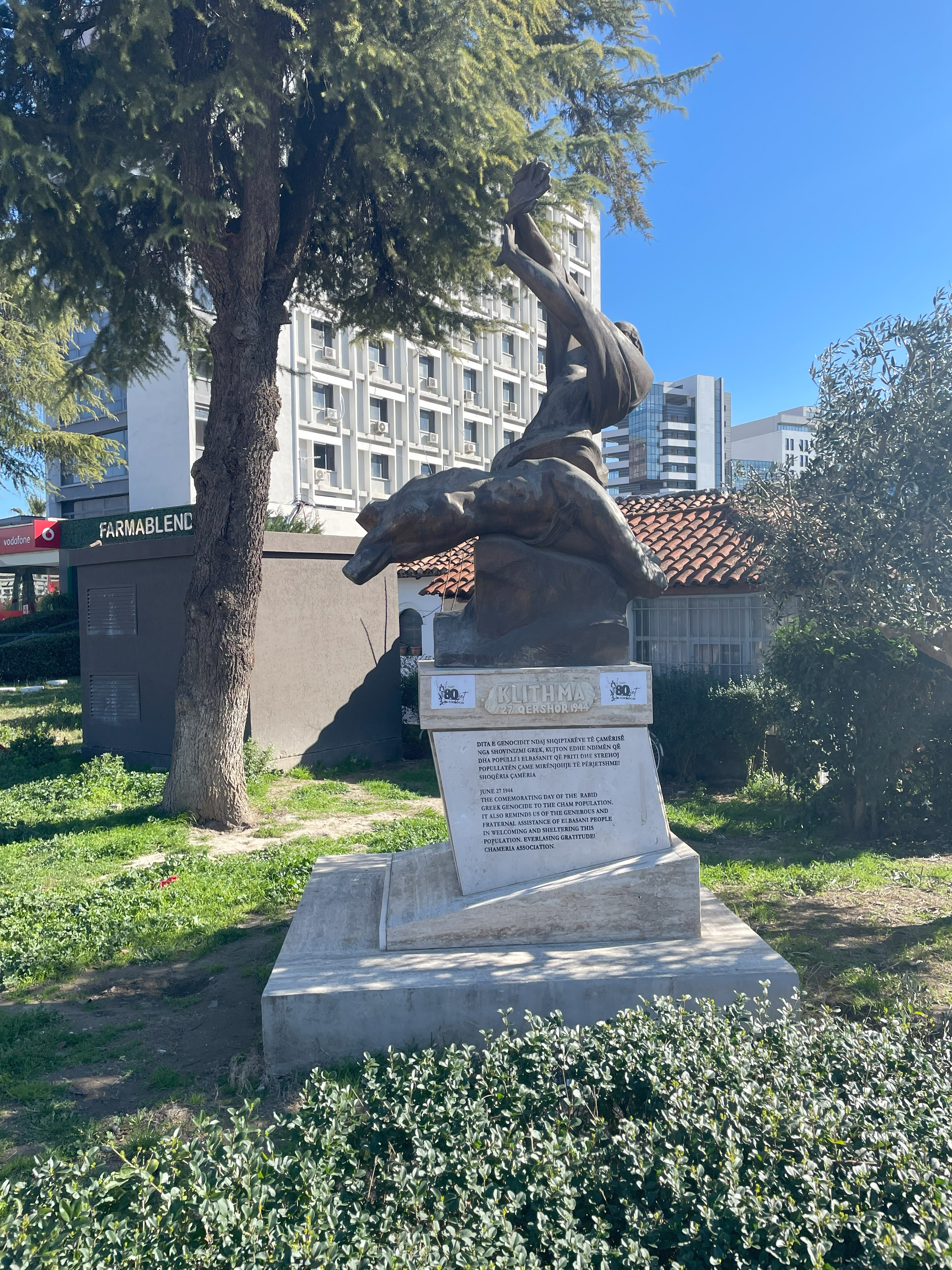
Monument to the expulsion of Cham Albanians in Elbasan

=== Settlement in Albania ===
After the expulsion the Cham community to Albania, Chams organized the Anti-Fascist Committee of Cham Immigrants, with the help of the newly established communist government of Albania. It was established, during the first wave of refugees, and it aimed to make Greece allow, the returning of Chams in their homes. They organized two congresses, adopted a memorandum and sent delegates in Greece and in European allies. After three years activity, the organization did not manage, neither to re-allocate Chams in Chameria, nor to internationalize the Cham issue. They were given new homes in parts of southern Albania by the People's Republic of Albania regime, thus diluting the local Greek element. At December 1945 the United Nations Relief and Rehabilitation Administration approved 1,45 Million U.S. dollars for the Cham refugees in Albania. Nevertheless, due to the deterioration of the relation between the People's Republic of Albania and the Western world the local regime prohibited any the financial and humanitarian aid. Since 1947, the Committee was charged with the normalization of living situations of Cham refugees in Albania. In 1951, Chams were forcibly given Albanian citizenship and the Committee was disbanded.

=== Cham politics and historiography ===
==== Albania ====
During the Cold War period the Cham issue did not garner much attention by historians. The Cham issue received little study in communist Albania due to the uncertain position of Muslim Chams in Albanian society. Having refused to fight on side of the communists in the Greek Civil War, they were labeled as "reactionaries", "war criminals", "murderers of the Greeks", "collaborators of the occupation forces" by the regime of the People's Republic of Albania and also persecuted to a certain extent. Considered a "hostile population" and a black sheep in the "heroic resistance of the Albanian people", Cham history was hidden or suppressed by the regime, and the persecution they had faced in Greece was omitted from history text books. While the emergence of present discourse is motivated by obvious financial and political reasons, it also attempts to fill the gap created by socialist historiography.

Serious study on the history of events has begun to emerge from Albania, Greece and Great Britain after the collapse of the Socialist Republic in Albania. The Cham issue would regain momentum in Albania in 1991, when the communist regime collapsed, and the National Political Association "Çamëria" was established. In 1994 the Albanian government declared 27 June as The Day of Greek Chauvinist Genocide Against the Albanians of Chameria but it has not received any international recognition. In post-communist Albania, Chams have been also presented as victims in another genocide: an exhibition in the National Museum in Tirana, bore the controversial title Genocide and Communist Terror in Albania 1944–1944 and considered the Cham as victims of a cleansing campaign of the P. R. of Albanian authorities. In general, publications in post-socialist Albania tend to favor an interpretation in which the Cham Albanians are drawn as collective victims of an 'ethnically' motivated persecution. On 10 December 2012, the leader of the nationalist Party for Justice, Integration and Unity (PDIU) presented to the Parliament of Albania a resolution where PDIU asked from the Greek government reparations in the amount of 10 Billion Euros for the Expulsion of Cham Albanians. Similarly, while in the official schoolbooks in Albania the Cham Albanian history was nearly non-existent, today's history taught in Albanian school mentions that "Greek chauvinist bands terrorized the Albanian population... in order to perpetuate the annexation of Albanian-inhabited lands." The issue of Chameria was firmly placed in the context of Albanian nationalism.

==== Greece ====
For the Greek state, the expulsion of Muslim Chams was a closed case. The atrocities committed against the Muslim Cham community are absent from official documents, which suggests that the state wished to erase any evidence of what had occurred. The very limited number of printed material that surfaced after the war attempted to reconstruct the events that transpired during the turbulent period with the implicit aim of justifying the expulsion, which might also be termed as ethnic cleansing by a number of scholars. During the Cold War period the Greek origin theory of Muslim Chams became a central theme, appearing even in scientific works, and the Albanian linguistic tradition of the area was continuously downplayed. In this way, and in accordance with the approach of claiming a territory through its population, a purely Greek history and character of Chameria was retained in official politics.

The atrocities that took place do not appear to have been sanctioned by Greek government officials or the EDES leadership, and there is strong evidence that, EDES leadership at least in private, disproved of the atrocities. Officials were both indifferent towards it and received its results favorably. The leader of EDES, and hero in the eyes of the state, Napoleon Zervas, in a letter dated 1953 wrote to one of his comrades "Our fellow country men of the area must recall once more who got rid of the Muslim Chams who were pushing down the neck of Hellenism for five hundred years." According to Greek scholar Lambros Baltsiotis, the leniency shown towards individuals involved in the atrocities strongly indicates that the expulsion was accepted by the Greek state and formed part of state policy. Historian Spyros Tsoutsoumpis states that the reluctance of EDES leadership to prosecute certain individuals was likely due to fear of it resulting in defections and a considerable drop in support.

In an attempt to give a solution, in 1992 Prime Minister Konstantinos Mitsotakis proposed a trade-off in relation to their properties, only for the cases where their owners had certifiably not been convicted or participated in crimes against their fellow Greek citizens. Mitsotakis also proposed that the Albanian government likewise compensate ethnic Greeks who had lost properties due to alleged persecution during the communist regime in Albania. This proposal however was rejected by the Albanian side. The positions of the Greek government, which considers the Cham-issue non-existent, are generally based on the principles of international law, and therefore there is no obligation against the Cham community since it does not constitute a minority in Greece.

In Greek historiography, two main schools of examination regarding the expulsion of Cham Albanians have appeared. A corpus of works written mostly by non-historians including local politicians were published with explicit goal of justifying state violence against Cham Albanians and to support irredentist claims of the Greek state towards Albania. These works often presented Albanians as "brutes" who were naturally inclined to collaborate with the Nazis, they exaggerated the collaboration of Cham Albanians with the Nazis and accordingly downplayed violence by Greek nationalists against Cham Albanians. Newer generations of scholars re-examined this narrative and argued that the Greek state actively instigated violence against Cham Albanians and that their expulsion wasn't simply linked to collaborationism but an "outcome of state policy since the Interwar period" which sought to eliminate the presence of the Cham Albanian minority in Greece.

== See also ==
- Axis-Cham Albanian collaboration
- Ethnic cleansing
- Expulsion of Germans after World War II
- Expulsion of Poles by Germany
- Muhajir (Albania)
- Population transfer
- Population transfer in the Soviet Union
- The expulsion of the Albanians, memorandum of 1937.
- Victor Gollancz
- World War II-era population transfers

== Bibliography ==
- Baltsiotis, Lambros (13 November 2011). "The Muslim Chams of Northwestern Greece: The grounds for the expulsion of a "non-existent" minority community". European Journal of Turkish Studies. Social Sciences on Contemporary Turkey. 12: 1–31. doi:10.4000/ejts.4444. S2CID 142733144. Note 95
- Elsie, Robert; Destani, Bejtullah D.; Jasini, Rudina, eds. (2013). The Cham Albanians of Greece. A Documentary History. IB Tauris. ISBN 9781780760001.
- Kretsi, Georgia (2002). "The Secret Past of the Greek-Albanian Borderlands. Cham Muslim Albanians: Perspectives on a Conflict over Historical Accountability and Current Rights". Ethnologia Balkanica: Journal for Southeast European Anthropology. 6: 171–195.
- Kretsi, Georgia (2007). Verfolgung und Gedächtnis in Albanien : eine Analyse postsozialistischer Erinnerungsstrategien. Wiesbaden: Harrassowitz. ISBN 978-3-447-05544-4.
- Manta, Eleftheria (2009). "The Cams of Albania and the Greek State (1923–1945)". Journal of Muslim Minority Affairs. 29 (4): 523–535 [1-12 in PDF]. doi:10.1080/13602000903411424. S2CID 144176577.
- Meyer, Hermann Frank (2008). Blutiges Edelweiß: Die 1. Gebirgs-division im zweiten Weltkrieg [Bloodstained Edelweiss. The 1st Mountain-Division in WWII] (in German). Ch. Links Verlag. ISBN 978-3-86153-447-1.
- Pettifer, James (2009). Woodhouse, Zervas And The Chams – Exploring The Second World War Heritage (PDF). Onufri.
- Pitouli-Kitsou, Hristina (1997). Οι Ελληνοαλβανικές Σχέσεις και το βορειοηπειρωτικό ζήτημα κατά περίοδο 1907–1914 (Thesis). National and Kapodistrian University of Athens.
- Tsitselikis, Konstantinos (2012). Old and New Islam in Greece: From historical minorities to immigrant newcomers. Martinus Nijhoff Publishers. ISBN 9789004221529.
- Tsoutsoumpis, Spyros (December 2015). "Violence, resistance and collaboration in a Greek borderland: the case of the Muslim Chams of Epirus". Qualestoria (2): 119–138.
- Tsoutsoumpis, Spiros (2016). A history of the Greek resistance in the Second World War: The people's armies. Manchester University Press. ISBN 978-1526100931.
- Isufi, Hajredin (2002). Musa Demi dhe qëndresa çame: 1800-1947. Botime Dudaj. ISBN 9992750103.
