= Anti-Fascist Committee of Cham Immigrants =

The Anti-Fascist Committee of Cham Immigrants was an organization created by Cham Albanians, when they were expelled from Greece, with the help of the newly established communist government of Albania. It was established, during the first wave of refugees, and it aimed to make Greece allow, the returning of Chams in their homes. They organized two congresses, adopted a memorandum and sent delegates in Greece and in European allies. After three years activity, the organization did not manage, neither to re-allocate Chams in Chameria, nor to internationalize the Cham issue. Greece did not acknowledge that EDES had expelled Chams, saying that they fled and that they could return, although this was impossible. The international community did not respond to Chams plea, but they acknowledged the humanitarian disaster. Since 1947, the committee was charged with the normalization of living situations of Cham refugees in Albania. In 1951, Chams were forcibly given the Albanian citizenship and the committee was disbanded. The Cham issue did not regain momentum until 1991, when the communist regime collapsed, and the National Political Association "Çamëria" was established.

== Background ==
In 1913, the area of Chameria, as the whole Southern Epirus came under Greek control. The Albanian state complained that the Greek government was persecuting the Muslim Cham community, however there was no evidence of direct state persecution Muslim Chams were counted as a religious minority, and some of them were transferred to Turkey, during the 1923 population exchange, while their property was alienated by the Greek government. Orthodox Cham Albanians were counted as Greeks, and their language and Albanian heritage were under pressure of assimilation.

Following the Italian occupation of Albania in 1939, the Chams became a prominent propaganda tool for the Italians. As a result, on the eve of the Greco-Italian War, the adult male Cham population was deported by the Greek authorities to internment camps. After the occupation of Greece, some Cham Albanians collaborated with Italian and German forces, while approximately the same number participated in the Albanian and Greek resistance movements; the majority however remained uninvolved in the war. Nevertheless, in 1944, the entire Muslim Cham population was expelled from Greece, by a republican resistance group, as a result of the participation of Chams in the communist resistance group of Greece, and the collaboration with the Axis of some members of the minority. This expulsion intended to create a pure ethnic border and to facilitate the anti-communist movement in the aftermath of the war. Most of the Chams crossed the border into Albania, while others formed émigré communities in Turkey and the United States. Today, their descendants continue to live in these countries, although their religious affiliation has changed considerably in the past decades. At the same time, the Orthodox minority that remained in Greece has suffered from decades of suppression of their heritage and language.

== Creation ==
Muslim Cham Albanians that fled in Albania, were organised as refugees by the communist-led Albanian government. The Anti-Fascist Committee of Cham Immigrants was created since 1944, as part of the Anti-Fascist National Liberation Front, led by the communists, in order to lobby for the returning of Chams in their homes and to create the facilities for their surviving in the refugee camps that were created in Albania. The new post-war Communist government of Albania took the Cham issue to the Paris Peace Conference to demand the repatriation of the Chams and the return of their property, but no answer was given. At the same time, they established refugee camps and distributed Chams throughout Albania, especially in regions like Fier, Durrës and Tirana.

=== Aims ===
Their aims were to return in their homes and to get assistance for their destroyed properties. In a six-point resolution they asked the international community:

1. That immediate steps be taken to prevent the settling of foreign elements in our homes,
2. That all Chams be repatriated,
3. That all our properties be returned [to us] and all damages to real and moveable properties of ours be compensated,
4. That assistance be given to rebuild our homes and resettle [our people],
5. That steps be taken to insure the benefits that derive from international treaties and mandates, such as the security of civil, political, and cultural rights, and the security of the person,
6. That all persons responsible for crimes committed be tried and punished.

— Anti-Fascist Committee of Cham Immigrants,

=== Memorandum ===
Chams adopted a memorandum, in which they reacted to their expulsion. According to the document of the "Anti-Fascist Committee of Cham Immigrants", in total 2,771 Albanian civilians were killed during the 1944-1945 attacks on their villages. The breakdown is as follows: in Filiates and suburbs 1,286, in Igoumenitsa and suburbs 192, in Paramythia and suburbs 673 and Parga 620. Sixty-eight villages with 5,800 houses were looted and then burnt. A detailed list of material losses includes 110,000 sheep, 2,400 cattle, 21,000 quintals of wheat and 80,000 quintals of edible oil, amounting to 11,000,000 kilograms of grain and 3,000,000 kilograms of edible oil. As a result of these assaults, an estimated 28,000 Chams fled to Albania.

According to the memorandum the reason of their expulsion, was their resistance alongside ELAS and not EDES.
We, the Anti-Fascist Committee of Cham immigrants in Albania, having faith in the democratic and humanitarian principles of the UN, and acting in the name of Cham immigrants in Albania, do hereby address the Investigating Commission concerning our lost rights, oppression, persecutions and massacres committed by Greek Fascists in order to exterminate the Albanian minority in Greece.

In pursuit of the protests and appeals that we have addressed to the Great Allies and the United Nations, we ask for justice with regard to the following:

For 32 years in succession, Greek chauvinist and reactionary cliques, in brutal violation of every humanitarian principle, and in total disregard of international treaties, have carried out a policy of extermination toward the Albanian minority in Greece.

Beginning with the Greek occupation of Chameria on February 23, 1913, the gang of Deli Janaqi, incited and assisted by the local authorities, massacred without cause whatsoever 72 men, in the brook of Selani, district of Paramithia.

This massacre marked the beginning of the drive to exterminate the Albanian minority, and made clear the orientation of Greek policy toward our population.

The hounding, persecutions, imprisonment, internment, tortures, and plunder carried out on the pretext of disarming [the population] in the years 1914–1921, the terrorist actions of outlaws, and the provocations of Gjen Baire in 1921, reveal the reality of the sufferings to which our population was subjected during the Greek occupation.

Koska, Lopsi, Varfanj, Karbunara, Kardhiq, Paramithia, Margëllëç, Arpica, Grykohori, and others, are some of the villages that paid an especially high price as a consequence of the terror.

In 1922–1923, the Greek authorities decided to displace the Moslem element of Chameria, in exchange for the Greeks in Asia Minor, on the pretext that we were Turks. This shameless act of the Athenian authorities ran into opposition on our part and the intervention of the League of Nations which, upon ascertaining the Albanian nationality of our people, rejected the decision of the Greek Government.

But despite the intervention of the League of Nations, and the solemn commitments undertaken by the Greek Government in Lausanne on 16 January 1923, the authorities in Athens continued their policy of extermination. They resorted to every device to make it difficult for the Albanian element to remain in Chameria, and confiscated 6,000 hectares of land owned by hundreds of families in Dushk, Gumenica, Kardhiq, Karbunara, and others, without compensating them in the least.

The government in Athens settled the immigrants from Asia Minor in Chameria, with the intention of peopling it with Greeks and creating conditions that would lead to the emigration of the autochthonous Albanian population.

Entire families were forced to abandon their birthplace and migrate to Turkey, Albania, America and elsewhere, and villages like Petrovica and Shëndellia were deserted completely by their Albanian inhabitants.

Under these circumstances, we did not enjoy any national rights, not even the use of our mother tongue. Fanaticism and ignorance were given support, instead of developing our national culture and stimulating progress. Instead of opening schools, they subsidized religious clubs in the Arab language. Ninety-five percent of our population remained illiterate. The province of Chameria, a fertile and prosperous land, remained backward, without economic development, without communication facilities, and in the hands of money-lenders and monopolists, such as: Koçoni, Pitulejtë, Kufalla, Zhulla, Ringa and others, who impoverished and enslaved the entire region.

In the war against Fascism, and more precisely at its conclusion, the reactionary Monarcho-Fascist forces of Llaka of Suli, which were created by the reaction to serve the occupier under the command of General Napoleon Zervas, turned on and treacherously massacred the Moslem Albanian inhabitants of Chameria.

At that time, when the troops of ELAS [National Popular Liberation Army] and our troops were committed to fighting the Germans, the leadership of EOEA [National Troops of Greek Guerillas], in league with the Germans, maneuvered to gain positions to fight a civil war. And when our forces, in keeping with the spirit and decisions of the protocol of Caserta (Sarafis-Zervas), August 1944, implemented the orders of the Joint Command in pursuit of the Germans, General Napoleon Zervas, commander of the resistance forces in Epirus (ELAS – EOEA), gave orders to massacre the innocent population of Chameria.

The massacres in Chameria were a flagrant violation of humanitarian principles, and a shameless disregard for the principles and the nature of the Anti-Fascist struggle. The massacres in Chameria were a result of collaboration and agreements with the Germans, who in the process of retreating, let Zervas forces take their place. Here is a concrete example of the collaboration between Zervas forces and the Germans. Theodhor Vito, the commander of the Zervas forces in the district of Filat, met the commander of the retreating German forces on 22 September 1944, in the village of Panaromen, 3 km. from Filat, just one day before the entrance of Zervas forces in Filat. Right after that meeting, and even before the German forces cleared out of Filat entirely, the forces of Theodhor Vito entered Filat. That close collaboration strengthened the position of the Zervas forces, and enabled them to initiate the terror and the massacres on a broad scale in all the districts of Chameria.

The forces of the 10th Division of EOEA, under the command of Col. Vasil Kamaras, and specifically the 16th Regiment of that division, which was led by Kranja and his aides Lefter Strugari, attorney Stavropullos Ballumi Zotos, the notorious criminals Patazejt and others, entered the town of Paramithia on 27 June 1944. Contrary to their promises and the agreement arrived at between mufti Hasan Abdullaj, on the one hand, and Shapera and the Bishop of Paramithia, on the other, who acted as agents of Zervas, the most ignoble massacres were set in motion. Defenseless men, women and children became targets for the Greek Monarcho-Fascists. The number of the massacred in the town of Paramithia and vicinity reached 600 souls.

On 28 July 1944, the forces of 40th Regiment, commanded by Agores, entered Parga and massacred 52 men, women and children.

The forces of EOEA under the command of Theodhor Vito, Ilija Kaqo, Hristo Mavrudhi, Hristo Kaqo, Hari Dhiamanti and others, first encircled the town of Filat, then on Saturday morning of 23 September 1944, entered the town. The same day they also entered Spatar. They plundered and seized all of the families, and whatever else they found. On the eve of [September] 23 and the dawn of 24 September 1944, there entered also the forces commanded by Kranja, Strugari and others. As soon as these forces arrived, the massacres began. Forty-seven men, women and children were massacred in Filat, while 157 were killed or missing in Spatar, many of whom had gone there from other villages. All of the young women and girls were abused and raped by Zervas criminals. A few days later the Monarcho-Fascists rounded up all of the men that remained, and following the decision of a kangaroo court, consisting of Koçinja – president, Staropull – prosecuting attorney, and four other members, 47 innocent Albanians were massacred. In Granica near Filat are buried the corpses of 46 persons who were slain with knives, and 45 others on the plain bordering the field of Xhelo Meto.

Other families were wiped out, including parents, children and babies in their cribs. Women and young girls were raped. Hundreds of declarations by those who survived, describe the killings and endless suffering. They make plain the crimes and aims of the Monarcho-Fascists in Chameria.

Here are some examples:

Sanie Bollati of Paramithia was burned alive with gasoline, after her breasts were cut off, and her eyes were plucked out. Ymer Murati was murdered and his body was chopped up in Paramithia.

In the house of Sulo Tari had gathered more than 40 women. Çili Popova from Popova, wearing a military uniform, and a group of soldiers, entered the house, seized the prettiest women and girls and began to rape them in another room. The screams of the girls and the women were deafening. This debauchery continued all night. Seri Fejzo, Fizret Sulo Tare and others, were victims of their baseness.

Hilmi Beqiri of Filat was wounded in front of his family and left there, as the attackers took off. Wanting to shelter him, the family brought him over to the dentist Mavrudhiu. He kept him for a few hours, but later sent word to have him taken away. The family then took him to Stavro Muhaxhiri, after which they went over to Shuaip Metja, where many other families had gathered. The Andartes [Greek irregulars] were informed about this, and they went over and seized him, and after pulling his gold teeth with pliers, killed him. Malo Muho, an 80-year-old man, who had been ailing for four years, was butchered with a hatchet in front of his wife. His brain splattered on the lap of his wife, who gathered it together, and after covering him with a quilt, ran away.

Abdyl Nurqe was seized in Spatar and taken barefooted to Filat, where he was dragged through the streets of the town, and finally killed in front of the house of Nidh Tafoqi.

The family of Lile Rustemi from Sullashi, numbering 16 persons, most of them children, was totally wiped out, without anyone being able to survive.

Xhelal Miniti of Paramithia was beheaded with a bayonet over the body of mufti Hasan Abdullahu.

Sali Muhedini, Abedin Bakos, Muhamet Pronja and Malo Sejdiu had their fingers, nose, tongue, and feet cut off, and while they screamed with pain, Andartes of Zervas sang the song of their commander, and rejoiced as they witnessed this scene of terror. In the end, they hung them with butchers' grappling irons.

The following is the declaration of Eshref Himi, a resident of Paramithia, concerning the massacres in Paramithia:

"On Tuesday, 27 June 1944, at 7 in the morning, the Greek Monarcho-Fascists entered Paramithia, commanded by Col. Kamora, Major Kranja, Captain Kristo Stavropulli, an attorney; Captain Lefter Strugari, attorney; sub-lieutenant Nikolla Çenos, and others. As soon as they entered the city, the order was given that no one should leave, because no one's honor, liberty or property would be threatened in any way. Immediately in the afternoon, there began the arrest of men, women and children, and thievery as well. By next morning all the men were murdered.

"After imprisoning me for four days, they let me go, so as to bury the dead. On the site called 'The Church of Ajorgji', I was able to identify five of the bodies. The others were beyond recognition, on account of the tortures inflicted on them. The five victims I was able to identify were: Met Qere, Sami Asimi, Mahmut Kupi, Adem Beqiri, Haki Mile. Two days later, they sent me over to 'Golataj', near the house of Dhimitër Nikolla, where they had murdered eight people. I could not recognize them, because they had cut them to pieces. All around there were corpses of people. A woman by the name of Sanie Bollati was subjected to frightful tortures and burned alive with gasoline. This tragedy took place on Wednesday, while on Friday morning, her body was removed, covered with a blanket by her mother and two townspeople, and placed in a cellar by order of the Monarcho-Fascists, who would not let anyone to see her. The wretched woman died there five days later. By then, her cadaver was full of maggots.

"All of the things I declare here, I have seen with my own eyes. At first, I hid for five days in the attic, but was arrested by the Monarcho-Fascists and turned over to Major Kranja who, after questioning me briefly, ordered that I be imprisoned. In prison I found 380 persons, including women and children. One hundred twenty of them died of starvation. Four persons and me were in prison for 15 days, after which they transported us to Preveza, and from there to Janina, where we stayed for 40 days. There we were subjected to indescribable tortures. We were freed after the arrival in this town of troops of the EAM [National Liberation Front]."

Dervish Sulo from the village of Spatar in [the district of] Filat, describes the massacres in Spatar as follows:

"In the morning of a Saturday in September, 1944, the entire population gathered in front of the (Spatar) village mosque. The soldiers began seizing and raping women, girls, and even old women. Paçe Çulani, 50 years of age, was raped, her hair was cut and even her ears, and finally she was killed in her own orchard, in the vicinity of Muço. In our house was installed the family of Sako Banushi from Skropjona, which numbered eight women, men, and children. After raping the women, whose breasts were pierced with knives, all were massacred….

"In the house of Damin Muhameti, 5 women and 3 children were killed... In the house of Fetin Muhameti, Hane Isufi and another woman were tortured and raped... In the house of Dule Sherifi, they cut off the heads of 80-year-old Sulejman Dhimicë and his wife. In the house of Meto Braho, 20 persons, including men, women and children, were burned alive... Kije Nurçia, 70 years of age, was knifed to death... In the vineyard of Zule and the garden of Avdyl Nurçe, I saw 20 people who had been massacred. In the house of Haxhi Latifi, the daughter of Haxhi Gulani was raped, while in the dwelling of Mejdi Meto, Hava Ajshja was raped, and Nano Arapi was both raped and killed."

According to statistics available to date, the victims and the missing among the Albanian minority in Greece, during the massacres in the years 1944–1945, number 2,877, broken down as follows:

Filat and vicinity, 1,286; Gumenica and vicinity, 192; Paramithia and vicinity, 673; and Margellëç and Parga, 626. This was the fate of all those who were unable to flee Chameria, with the exception of a few women who are today living witnesses of the chilling massacres in Paramithia, Parga, Spatar, and Filat. The words that come from their mouths make clear the naked criminality and barbaric acts, organized by the Greek Monarcho-Fascist reaction in Chameria.

This carnage, inspired by the basest sentiments of chauvinistic and religious hatred, resulted in the displacement of nearly 23,000 Chams, who afterward found shelter in Albania under the most miserable conditions.

A total of 68 villages with over 5,800 houses, were seized, destroyed and burned down.

An account of the damages reveals that the Monarcho-Fascist forces of Zervas seized the following assets left behind [by the Chams] in Chameria: 17,000 heads of sheep and goats, 1,200 heads of cattle, 21,000 quintals of cereals, and 80,000 quintals of [olive] oil; plus the produce of the year 1944–1945, which totaled 11,000,000 kg. of cereals, and 3,000,000 kilograms of [olive] oil. During the exodus, 110,000 sheep and goats, and 2,400 cattle died or were lost.

This shows clearly the economic catastrophe that befell our people, which was forced to take the roads of immigration with only the clothes on their back.

This catastrophe happened because our people, together with the Greek people, fought alongside the EAM, rather than join the camp of the collaborationists who were allied with the occupiers.

Chameria contributed materially and morally to the great Anti-Fascist war. Hundreds of young Chams joined the ranks of ELAS, when EAM sounded the alarm for freedom. With the broadening of the Anti-Fascist war against the German occupiers, the population of Chameria threw itself unreservedly into the war against the occupier, and formed the Fourth Battalion of the 15th Regiment of ELAS. Out of the small population of Chameria, stepped forward over 500 troops who fought with determination against the Nazi-Fascist occupiers and the traitors in the camp of Zervas.

The blood of the national hero, Ali Demi, and of the martyr Bido Sejko; and the blood of martyrs Muharrem Myrtezaj, Ibrahim Hallumi, Hysen Vejseli and others, that was shed together with that of the Greek Partisans at the Pass of Qeramica, bears out this fact.

In Chameria at the end of the war, the troops commanded by General Napoleon Zervas operated in our districts and villages not as liberators, but as executioners and sworn enemies of the Albanian element.

In accordance with the Agreement of Caserta (Sarafis – Zervas) in August, 1944, the troops of the resistance were placed on a common front against the Nazi armies, under a joint command, in designated operational zones. This agreement was violated in Chameria. Zervas troops compromised with the Germans, and attacked our troops and obstructed the activity of the 4th Battalion of the 15th Regiment in the zone of Filat. The operations and massacres in the district of Filat are directly connected with this situation, and in open contradiction to the trust and spirit of cooperation established in Caserta. The last village of Chameria, Koska, which was one of the bases for organizing the resistance forces of the National-Liberation Front in Chameria, was destroyed and burned. It was the final action in the destruction of Chameria.

A Committee of the Cham Anti-Fascist Council was dispatched to Athens on 30 October 1944, to meet with the Greek Government of Papandreou, and protest against the massacres in Chameria, as well as demand that they be condemned. The Government of Papandreou refused to take any measures, or commit itself in any way regarding this matter.

Following the operations of December 1944 and the liberation of Chameria from the Zervist occupation, a portion of our population was repatriated and settled in the district of Filat. Then, on 12 March 1945, government forces of the garrison of Corfu, in violation of the Agreement of Varkiza (February 1945), organized and treacherously carried out the vile massacres in Vanre (Filat). This exposed once again the attitude and policy of the responsible authorities of the Greek Government, concerning the extermination of the Albanian population of Chameria.

In the wake of our immigration to Albania, the democratic Government of Albania gave to our masses boundless material and moral assistance. A fund of 240,000 francs was set aside by the Albanian Government for our people, and all-round efforts have been made to alleviate our deplorable condition.

Responding to this situation, the UNRRA Mission in Albania won approval from its headquarters in Washington [D.C.], to dispense 1,450,000 dollars as immediate relief to the immigrants, in view of our difficult situation.

Even in these conditions, Cham immigrants continued to contribute more and more to the Front. At the Conference of Shalës (Konispol), held at the end of September, 1944, the voice of the Chams in exile was raised strongly in favor of collaboration against the occupier, and the injustices of the Greek Monarcho-Fascists.

At the Congress of Vlora on 23 September 1945, the Cham delegates, who represented all the groups of Cham immigrants in Albania, spoke against the massacres that Greek Monarcho-Fascists had perpetrated among them, and demanded by means of memoranda addressed to the London Conference, an inquiry into their problem, and the condemnation of those responsible for the pointless bloodshed and immeasurable sufferings in Chameria. The Congress concluded with a resolution summarizing all of its proceedings.

While in exile, we have many times addressed appeals to the world, regarding the rights that have been denied us, and asked for repatriation.

On 30 October 1944, the Cham Anti-Fascist Council addressed a protest note to the Greek Government of National Unity, the Mediterranean Chief-of-Staff, the Allied Government, and the Central Committee of EAM, discussing the barbaric actions of the Greek Fascists in Chameria.

On 9 May 1945, the Cham Anti-Fascist Council dispatched to the Military Missions a copy of the telegram addressed to the President of the Conference in San Francisco, concerning the rights of the Chams, based on the Atlantic Charter.

On 27 June 1945, telegrams of protest by the Cham Anti-Fascist Council, against the massacres in Chameria, were addressed to the democratic Government of Albania, the Allied Military Missions including the Soviet, the English, the American, the French, and the Czechoslovak; the Yugoslav Legation, and the Albanians in America, Italy and Bulgaria. A memorandum was addressed to Mr. Hutchinson, Labour [Party] Deputy in Great Britain, on 26 November 1945.

Telegrams were addressed to the General Directorate of UNRRA, by the Cham Anti-Fascist Committee (25 September 1945), asking for aid.

A memorandum was addressed to the Presidency of the Conference of Allied Foreign Ministers in London, by the delegates of the Cham Congress, in September 1945.

A memorandum was addressed to the Assembly of the United Nations in London, by the Cham Anti-Fascist Committee, on 11 January 1946, bringing up again the issue of the massacres, and asking for the rights due [the Chams].

A memorandum was addressed to the United Nations Assembly in New York, by the Cham Anti-Fascist Committee on 25 October 1946 and later.

We are victims of the Monarchist regime that reigns in Greece today. Together with the fraternal Greek people, we are suffering the consequences of the dark terror that was inflicted on them throughout Greece.

For two and a half years now, we roam Albania in misery, away from the Fatherland, while our fertile lands are exploited unjustly by the agents of the Monarcho-Fascists in Chameria.

Our travails in exile have been, and continue to be without bounds. Thousands have perished owing to the situation that has come into being.

Despite our protests and the rights to which we are entitled, we continue to live in exile, while the Greek Government, without any justification, is busy settling alien inhabitants in our Chameria, in order to prevent our return.

In the name of our people, we protest once again against all these things, and present before the Investigating Commission of the UN Security Council, the tragedy that has taken place in Chameria, drawing attention to the barbaric acts carried out with the intention of wiping out the Cham people.

We stress the need for a speedy resolution of the Cham problem, and being persuaded that our demands will be met, we set them forth, as follows:

1. That immediate steps be taken to prevent the settling of foreign elements in our homes,
2. That all Chams be repatriated,
3. That all our properties be returned [to us] and all damages to real and moveable properties of ours be compensated,
4. That assistance be given to rebuild our homes and resettle [our people],
5. That steps be taken to insure the benefits that derive from international treaties and mandates, such as the security of civil, political, and cultural rights, and the security of the person,
6. That all persons responsible for crimes committed be tried and punished.

With our most distinguished considerations:

THE ANTI-FASCIST COMMITTEE OF CHAM IMMIGRANTS

Taho Sejko, Kasëm Demi, Rexhep Çami, Tahir Demi, Vehip Demi, Dervish Dojaka, Hilmi Seiti

=== Leaders ===
The leaders of Chams were prominent figures of the anti-fascist liberation war in both Chameria battalion and IV "Ali Demi" battalion. Tahir Demi, Ali Demi, was part of the leading group of the Chams, alongside Taho Sejko, Kasim Demi, Rexhep Çami, Vehip Demi, Dervish Dojaka and Hilmi Seiti.

== Refugee congresses ==
In the first years of their exodus in Albania, Chams organized to congresses, aiming to valuate the situation of the expelled population.

=== First Cham Congress ===
The first Cham congress was held under difficult circumstances at the end of World War II. It was organized in the town of Konispol, in the Albanian part of Chameria, where thousands of Chams were forcibly expelled by the forces of EDES. The congress was organized in a refugee camp, where Chams had been sheltered, while the town had been liberated by German forces only some months before. In this congress was adopted the memorandum, that was sent to the allied powers and was decided that the only solution to their issue, was their repatriation in Chameria and fair trials for the ones who expelled them.

=== Second Cham Congress ===
A year later, after Chams expelled for the second time the Committee organized a second congress on 23 September 1945. Vlora was chosen as the spot for the Second Cham Congress, as it had become a shelter for a majority of Chams, after their exodus, having more than 10 refugee camps. The second congress was finalized with more memorandums, which were sent to the London Peace Conference and to various Allied Military Missions in Albania, requesting the Cham issue be discussed.

== Diplomatic activities ==
=== In Greece ===
Chams sent a delegation of the CAFC to Athens to lodge a protest with the government of George Papandreou. The Cham delegation also delivered protest notes to the Greek National Union, the Mediterranean General Command, the missions of the Allied governments and the Central Committee of the National Liberation Front. The commission was completely ignored by the Greek authorities.

Greece's official position is at that time that it did not encourage Chams to flee, nor did it oppose their return; it just wanted to try war criminals and collaborators. In 1945, a Greek Special Court on Collaborators condemned 1,930 Chams in absentia (many of them to death), while their immovable property was confiscated by the Greek state. The ownership was not changed, but they were controlled by the Greek National Bank.

In every case, Cham Albanians could not return to Greece, because of the alleged crimes they were charged with and the climate of terror that several nationalist bands, backed by the National Guard, were sustaining in Thesprotia. Also they could not be assured for a fair trial since many who had taken part in the massacres against Chams, now held positions in the Greek Army's Epirus Command. In addition, belonging to opposite political camps, the Chams were unable to ask for their rights.

=== Internationalizing the issue ===
At the same time, the Committee tried to internationalize the issue, by sending telegrams of protest to several Allied Powers. The sent telegrams to the Soviet, British, American and French military missions, and the Yugoslav Legation in Tirana. The memorandum, adopted in the first congress, was sent also to the London and Paris Conference of Peace, and to the United Nations Assembly on 25 October 1946. Every telegram and memorandum ended with the plea: "Despite protests we have made and the rights we are entitled to, we continue to be in exile, whereas the Greek government has gone all out to establish aliens in our Chameria in order to prevent us from returning home."

== Human relief ==
Although, no demand of Chams was answered, the UN Assembly in New York City acknowledged the humanitarian crisis facing the refugees. From September 1945 to the spring of 1947, Albania received a total of US$26 million of assorted goods, materials and equipment from the UN Relief Programme, UNRRA (United Nations' Relief and Rehabilitation Administration). Of this approximately US$1.2 million was allocated specifically for refugees from northern Greece. According to historian Miranda Vickers "it was mainly due to this aid programme that Albania escaped a major famine".

== Aftermath ==
In 1951, the Albanian government granted forcefully Cham Albanians the Albanian citizenship and they were forced to integrate to Albanian society, disbanning the committee. Despite this many Chams still regard themselves as refugees deprived of their Greek citizenship and the right to return to their property in Greece. Until 1991, Cham Albanians had no right to be organized and the Cham Issue was not discussed neither by the Albanian Government, nor by the Greek one.

In 1953, Greece passed a law, that considered the Cham's agricultural properties as abandoned, and thus confiscated them. A year later, all urban properties were confiscated too. In 1974, the Greek citizenship of Cham Albanians taken off them, by the law on refugees.

The Albanian communist government was criticized for its international reactions. Actually, according to historians, the controversial Cham issue has lain dormant in recent years and none of the post-war Albanian governments, whether communist, democratic or socialist, have ventured to try to make it a key issue in bilateral relations with Greece. Many Chams were persecuted by the Albanian Communist regime, which, like the Greeks, believed that they had collaborated with the Italians and Germans during the Second World War. Many were therefore forced to flee to the United States, creating a new diaspora of Cham Albanians.

The Cham issue would regain momentum only in 1991, when the communist regime collapsed, and the National Political Association "Çamëria" was established.
