= Këshilla =

Albanian administration in Thesprotia, Greece

Këshilla (literally meaning "Council" in Albanian; Greek: Ξίλια, romanized: Xilia) was an Albanian administration in Thesprotia, Greece, during the Axis occupation of Greece (1941–1944). It was set up during the Fascist Italian occupation with the aim of annexing the Greek region into a greater Albanian state and continued its operations under Nazi German occupation until the defeat of Axis powers and the end of World War II. This initiative was undertaken by the Cham Albanian leaders of the Dino family, in particular the brothers Nuri and Mazar Dino, who "trapped" the majority of the Cham community into supporting the council. The policy of ethnic cleansing perpetrated by the Këshilla and other paramilitary organisations under the Dino clan was used as justification by the EDES resistance forces at the end of the war to expel the Muslim Cham community from the region, with the exception of small groups who had joined the EDES guerillas.

Këshilla was part of the Cham Albanian collaboration with the Axis during the Second World War.

== Background ==
Following the Italian invasion of Albania, the Albanian Kingdom became a protectorate of the Kingdom of Italy. The Italians, especially governor Francesco Jacomoni, used the Cham issue as a means to rally Albanian support. As the final excuse for the start of the Greco-Italian War, Jacomoni used the killing of a Cham Albanian leader Daut Hoxha, whose headless body was discovered near the village of Vrina in June 1940. It was alleged by the Italian-controlled government in Tirana that he had been murdered by Greek secret agents. Hoxha was a military leader of the Cham struggle during the inter-war years, leading to him being branded as a bandit by the Greek government.

In October 1940, the Greek authorities disarmed 1,800 Cham conscripts and put them to work on local roads. in the following month, after the Italian invasion, they seized all Albanian males not called up and deported them to camps or to island exile.

== Organisation ==
Under these circumstances, as Italy managed to became part of the occupation force in Greece after the German invasion, several hundred Cham Albanians formed Këshilla. Këshilla was founded in June 1942 as an Albanian political administration in the region of Thesprotia.

However it initially acquired a less political character during the Italian occupation, and may have been more of paramilitary organisation which the Fascist occupation authorities used to maintain as a security of a military. However, when Nazi German troops occupied the region in July 1943 Keshilla also seemed to gain a role as a political administration. As such Keshilla enforced illegal taxes in order to finance its armed groups.

After 1943 the Keshilla paramilitary troops were incorporated into the German Wehrmacht.

As part of the Cham Albanian attempt to establish a local administration in collaboration with the Axis occupation an Albanian High Commissioner, Xhemil Dino, was appointed, but his authority was limited, and for the duration of the Occupation, the area remained under direct control from the military authorities in Athens.

== Violence ==
The creation of the Keshilla accelerated violence in Thesprotia by Cham Albanian while such actions were also politically justified. On 19 February 1942, militiamen murdered the perfect of Thesprotia, Giorgos Vasilakos was murdered. This murder was followed by the assassinations of two civil servants, G. Dousias and P. Oikonomisis, and the murder of Andreas Papandreou, a notable and priest from the village of Karteri. These actions had a twofold aim; to drive out the Greek civilian authorities and to deprive the Greek community of its administrative authorities. Nevertheless, even during this period, hostilities remained largely local and uncoordinated despite the efforts of Keshilla which remained a loose conglomeration of militias that differed little from bandit gangs and was mostly occupied with mounting raids against the local Greek communities.

Keshilla armed bands took part alongside the German army in burning Greek villages though the local beys and the mufti did not support such actions. Keshilla paramilitary counting c. 800 troops took part in the murders and burning of the Fanari region in 1943.

== See also ==
- Axis occupation of Greece during World War II
- Expulsion of Cham Albanians
- Cham issue
