= Cham Albanian collaboration with the Axis =

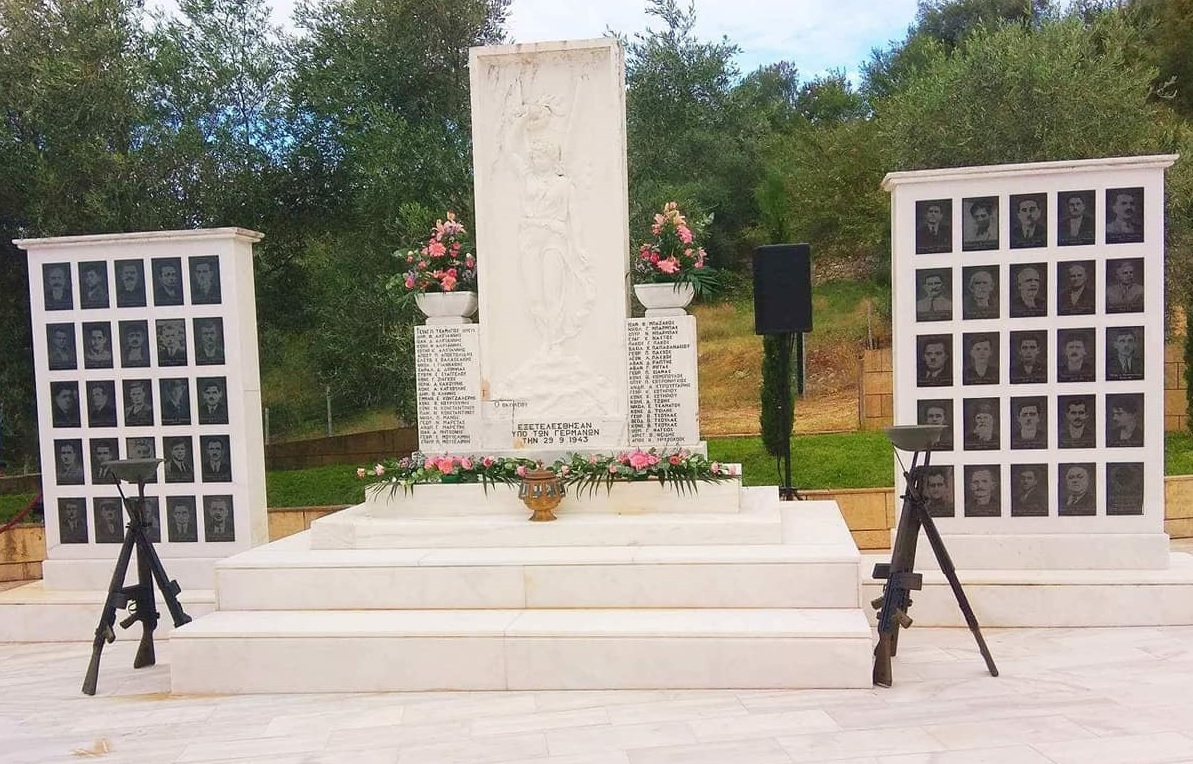
- Memorial to the victims of the mass executions in Paramythia
- Location: Thesprotia, Greece; Konispol, Albania
- Date: 1941-1944
- Target: Population hostile to the Axis occupation
- Attack type: Mass murder by firing squads, rapes, burning of villages, massacres, destruction of settlements and cultural heritage sites, transport of civilians to Nazi concentration camps, wide scale looting and banditry
- Deaths: In Greece: 1,065; Operation Augustus: 600; Paramythia Executions: 201; In Albania: 550; Operation Augustus: 50; Operation Horridoh: 500
- Victims: Civilian Greek population of Thesprotia, Greece and Konispol, Albania
- Perpetrators: Cham Albanian paramilitary, Këshilla; 1st Mountain Division (Wehrmacht), Nuri Dino battalion (Wehrmacht), Geheime Feldpolizei
- Motive: Ethnic Cleansing, Annexation of Thesprotia to Albania
- Verdict: Collaboration with the Axis occupation units, Plain murder

During the Axis occupation of Greece between 1941 and 1944 parts of the Cham Albanian minority (Albanian: Çamë, Greek: Τσάμηδες, Tsámides) in the Thesprotia prefecture, northwestern Greece, collaborated with the occupation forces. Fascist Italian as well as Nazi German propaganda promised that the region would be awarded to Albania (then in personal union with Italy) after the end of the war. As a result of this pro-Albanian approach, many Muslim Chams actively supported the Axis operations and committed a number of crimes against the local population both in Greece and Albania. Apart from the formation of a local administration and armed security battalions, a paramilitary organization named Këshilla and a resistance paramilitary group called Balli Kombetar Cam were operating in the region, manned by local Muslim Chams. The results were devastating: many Greek and Albanian citizens lost their lives and a great number of villages were burned and destroyed. It appears that the Mufti and many beys did not approve of the Cham helping the Wehrmacht to burn Greek villages. With the retreat of the Axis forces from Greece in 1944, most of the Cham population was expelled to Albania and revenge attacks against the remaining Chams were carried out by Greek guerrillas and villagers. When the war ended, special courts on collaboration sentenced 2,106 Chams to death in absentia. However, the war crimes remained unpunished since the criminals had already fled abroad. According to German historian Norbert Frei, the Muslim Cham minority is regarded as the "fourth occupation force" in Greece due to the collaborationist and criminal activities that large parts of the minority committed.

According to the Lieutenant Colonel Palmer of the British Military Mission in Albania, 2,000–3,000 collaborated in an organized manner, while a report of Pan-Epirotic EAM-Commission names 3,200 Cham collaborators from the Dino clan.

Although not everyone in the community actively collaborated, historiography agrees that the Cham minority completely accepted the Axis occupation and benefited from the presence of occupation troops by providing them with guides, connections, informants and other forms of support. Mainly due to their collaboration in World War II the Chams later became a controversial if not suspect community for the leaders of the People's Republic of Albania (1945-1991).

== Background ==
The region inhabited by the Chams, known among Albanians as "Chameria", consisted chiefly of the Thesprotia prefecture in Greece, as well as a few villages in southwestern Albania. Before 1945, the region had a mixed Greek and Albanian population dating to the migrations of Albanian tribes into the area in the 13th and 14th centuries. Many of the Chams, originally Orthodox Christians, were Islamicized in the 17th to 19th centuries, with Crypto-Christianity persisting as late as the early 19th century.

Given the Ottoman social structure, Muslim Cham landlords were a privileged part of the society and owned much of the most fertile land. Apart from the beys it seems that the majority of the Muslim Cham population consisted of middle sized land owners and also included families with ownership of small land parcels, few fields or animals and located in villages. A degree of antagonism existed between the two communities and conflict occurred on certain occasions.

Despite the claims of Greek and Albanian nationalists alike, surveys of the region of Thesprotia repeatedly noted the lack of "nationalisation" among the population; the Albanian speaking Christians referred to themselves not as Greeks but as "kaurs", while Albanophone Muslims did not call themselves "Albanian" but instead "Muslims" or "Turks"; even as late as the 1940s, the Muslims lacked any sort of Albanian consciousness and continued to describe themselves as "Turks"; Albanian nationalist ideas were espoused by a "minority of the educated and landowning class" but even these were divided between republican and royalist factions. Muslim religious authorities were conservative and of pro-Turkish persuasion, and accordingly they obstructed the growth of Albanian nationalism in the region.

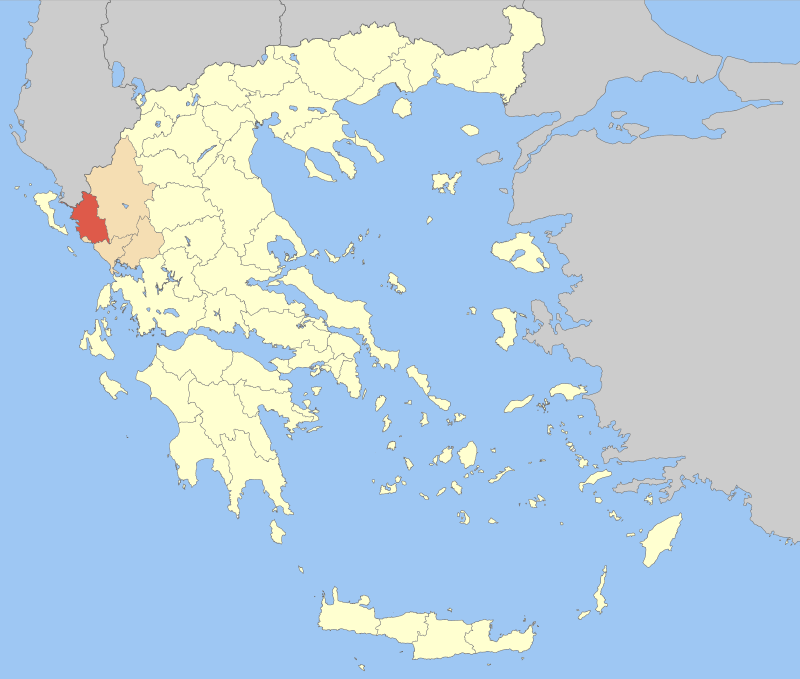
The region of Thesprotia (dark orange), roughly coterminous with Chameria, within Epirus (light orange) and Greece

Once Epirus passed to Greek hands in 1913 as a result of the Balkan Wars however, the Muslim beys lost their political influence, while retaining their economic weight. During the Interwar period, the Greek state did not take any serious effort to encourage their assimilation, although a number of complaints by the Chams to the League of Nations bear witness to a sense of grievance. However, there is little evidence of direct state persecution at this time. During that time though, members of the Cham community suffered from discrimination due to severe expropriations of their lands.

Relations between the various social groups were complicated in the region and were characterized primarily by an intense honor culture featuring clans and blood feuds among all major groups, antagonisms between the pastoralist (Vlach) and sedentary (Greek and Albanian) populations, religious rivalries between landowning Muslims and often land-starved Christian itinerant farmers who worked in "deplorable" conditions, and the exploitation of religious affiliations by both Christians and Muslims to win disputes. At the same time there was a high rate of interreligious clan alliances, friendships, blood-brotherhoods, adoptions (where the adoptee retained their parents' religion despite the parents practicing another) and interreligious marriages. Muslim peasants often gave their children Christian names and attended Christian services, while Christians likewise would consult Muslim clergy.

In the early 20th century, the bonds between the various Christian and Muslim communities began to weaken as clergy on both sides railed against interreligious relationships. Further stress was placed on interreligious relationships by conflicts over land and resources, the allotment of formerly Muslim-controlled resources to refugees from Turkey, anti-Albanian policies by the Metaxas government beginning in 1936 which included suppression of the Albanian language and harassment of Muslim notables, and finally in 1939 the beginning of irredentist pressures emanating from Italy and Italian occupied Albania calling for the annexation of Thesprotia to Albania.

In the late 1930s, especially after Albania became a protectorate of Fascist Italy, relations between the Cham community and the Greek state also deteriorated considerably, as, with the encouragement of the Italian authorities in Albania, irredentist elements of this community became more vocal. The Italian governor of Albania, Francesco Jacomoni, was an especially vocal proponent of Albanian claims in Greece and Kosovo, hoping to use them as a means of rallying Albanian support around the Fascist regime. In the event, Albanian enthusiasm for the "liberation of Chameria" was muted, but as Italian invasion became imminent in fall 1940, the Greek authorities disarmed the Cham conscripts in the Army, and later rounded up the male population and sent it to internal exile.

Prior to the outbreak of World War II, 28 villages in the region were inhabited exclusively by Muslim Chams, and an additional 20 villages had mixed (Greek-Muslim Cham) populations.

== Italian occupation ==
=== Greco-Italian War and Italian occupation of October–November 1940 ===
When the Greek-Italian War broke out in October 1940, the Italian forces had the support of 3,500 Albanians, among them members of the Cham community in Greece. Their performance however was distinctly lackluster; most Albanians, poorly motivated, either deserted or defected. During October 28 – November 1940 while the Italian army made a short advance and briefly took control of part of Thesprotia. Albanian Muslim irregulars began a spree of looting and violence against Greek villagers, and burned the provincial capital of Igoumenitsa to the ground, causing Greek villagers to flee into the mountains. Paramythia and Filiates were also burnt to the ground and representatives of the local communities were murdered by the Cham bands. A local "civil war" broke out in Thesprotia almost immediately with the arrival of the Italian army and its Albanian auxiliaries into the region. However, it was not at first "sectarianised" yet. Some 300 to 400 local Muslim villagers, especially from Gropa, aided the Italian army, and attacked the retreating Greek army and inflicted considerable casualties. A significant number of Albanian Muslim peasants provided armed support to the Italian invasion, however many Albanian Muslims abstained from such activities and proclaimed their disgust at their co-religionists' behavior. In the case of the village of Agios Vlasis the Albanian Muslim inhabitants sheltered "their Christian compatriots" from violence. In the town of Filiates the sacking and destruction committed by Albanian irregulars and Italian soldiers was of such extent that the local Italian military commander was compelled to promulgate an order to curtail the general anarchy.

The Greek army repelled the attack and advanced. Chams support to Italy was paid back by the Greeks, who interned the majority of the male population of the Chams for security reasons. The Greek army and, with it, the internally displaced Christian population returned, a new round of violence in the deepening cycle of revenge erupted.After a large number of Muslim peasants were court-martialed, a massacre occurred at a prison in Igoumenitsa wherein Christian men broke in and murdered those arrested for the deaths of their relatives. The deportation of Muslim men aged 18 to 50 deprived the Muslim population of much of its work force and those who could have defended them from the nascent local criminal elements and vengeful Christian bands. Tsoutsoumpis notes that just as Muslims had earlier refused to help the Italian and Albanian occupiers, the majority of the Christian population was disgusted by the violence, and Greek villagers often protected Muslim neighbors from outside predation, and many Muslims were hidden by their Greek blood-brothers. With the intervention of Germany, Greece soon capitulated. The entire country came under a triple occupation by German, Italian and Bulgarian troops.

=== Italian occupation (1941–1943) ===
Germany was against the annexation of the region to Albania that time. Nevertheless, Fascist Italian as well as Nazi German propaganda promised that the region would be part of Great Albania after the end of the war. The next round of atrocities did not begin immediately. Italy initially halted its "separatist pro-Albanian policy" for fear of a Greek backlash, and retained the Greek authorities and gendarmerie (although with poor arms and diminished force), despite Albanian protests. Nevertheless, Italian authorities proved tolerant of murders committed by the Muslim population and allowed them to openly carry arms, ultimately encouraging a spate of murders that came to grow into serious communal conflicts, with the first major conflicts breaking out in Filiates in late October 1941. The establishment of the Italian occupation authorities in Epirus was complete up until middle May 1941 and the following month the first armed units consisting of Cham Albanians took action in the region.

The occupation forces installed a local Cham administration in the town of Paramythia, with Xhemil Dino as local administrator of Thesprotia and as a representative of the Albanian government. At the time the town of Paramythia had a mixed Greek-Cham population of 6,000. Apart from the local Cham administration (Këshilla), active from July 1942, its paramilitary militia and gendarmerie of the same name began operating from 1943. According to post-war courts decisions and testimonies, during the Italian occupation these armed units were responsible for large scale criminal activity: murders, rapes, village burnings and looting.

Fictive kinship ties and regional loyalties still served to restrain the violence at this time, with Muslims often warning or sheltering their Christian neighbors, and in some cases threatening violence against other Muslims if their neighbors were harmed. In some cases, Muslim clans that were committing violence against Christian clans were involved in the protection of other Christian clans. Motivations were not national or religious but instead were motivated by clan and personal rivalries; one British officer remarked that "the whole war is viewed by the Greeks and Albanians from a parochial standpoint with the result that their actions are often controlled by the value of the belligerents to the local cause". However as the violence continued and deepened, and with the rise of the Keshilla, acts of cross-religious solidarity became rarer, and the conflict was increasingly sectarianised. By 1942, according to oral histories, the region was in a civil war, with clans and villages pitted against each other, and the Christian population was forced to flee into the highlands. Their properties were redistributed among Muslims, especially the poorest Muslim classes, who benefited the most from their flight.

==== Operation "Augustus" ====
From 29 July – 31 August 1943, while the region was typically under Italian occupation, a combined German and Cham force launched an anti-partisan sweep operation codenamed Augustus. During the subsequent operations, 600 Greek villagers were killed and 70 villages in the region were destroyed. 500 Greek citizens were taken hostages and 160 of them were sent to forced labour in Nazi Germany. In 21 settlements in the vicinity of Kanallaki 400 inhabitants were arrested and forced to march to the nearest concentration camp in Thessaloniki (KZ Pavlos Melas). When the march begun the armed groups did not hesitate to execute a diseased priest in front of the rest of the hostages. In exchange of their support, German Lieutenant Colonel Josef Remold offered the Chams weapons and equipment. As a token of appreciation, Nuri Dino, the leader of the Cham security battalions, promised to secure the region of the Acheron river, south of Paramythia, against Allied infiltration.

== German occupation ==
In September 1943, following Italian capitulation, the region officially came under German control. The German commander of Paramythia, in need of the support of the Cham population, repeated to the Albanian community the promise that the region would become part of Greater Albania after the war.

By time Operation Augustus ended, a larger number of Muslim Chams was recruited for the armed support of the Axis side forming additional battalions of Cham volunteers. Their support was appreciated by the Germans: Lt Colonel Josef Remold remarked that "with their knowledge of the surrounding area, they have proved their value in the scouting missions". On several occasions these scouting missions engaged EDES units in combat. On September 27, combined German and Cham forces launched large scale operation in burning and destroying villages north of Paramythia: Eleftherochori, Seliani, Semelika, Aghios Nikolaos, killing 50 Greek villagers in the process. In this operation the Cham contingent numbered 150 men, and, according to German Major Stöckert, "performed very well".

=== Paramythia incident ===
On the night of 27 September, Cham militias arrested 53 prominent Greek citizens in Paramythia and executed 49 of them two days later. This action was orchestrated by the brothers Nuri and Mazar Dino (an officer of the Cham militia) in order to get rid of the town's Greek representatives and intellectuals. According to German reports, Cham militias were also part of the firing squad.

During 20–29 September, as a result of serial violent activities, at least 75 Greek citizens were killed in Paramythia and 19 municipalities were destroyed. On 30 September, the Swiss representative of the International Red Cross, Hans-Jakob Bickel, visited the area and concluded:

20,000 Albanians, with Italian and now German support, spread terror to the rest of the population. Only in the region of Fanari 24 villages were destroyed. The entire harvest was taken by them. In my trip I realized that the Albanians kept the Greeks terrified inside their homes. Young Albanians, just finished from school, wandered heavily armed. The Greek population of Igoumenitsa had to find refuge in the mountains. The Albanians had stolen all the cattle and the fields remain uncultivated.

=== Nazi-Cham activities in southern Albania ===
After the capitulation of Fascist Italy, in September 1943, the local British mission proposed an alliance to the Chams and to fight together the Germans, but this proposal was rejected.

Although operation Augustus took place mostly in Greek territory, such activities had also spread to southern Albania, with combined German and Cham Albanian units executing c. 50 Albanians in the process.

Due to increasing resistance activity at the end of 1943 in southern Albania, German General and local commander Hubert Lanz, decided to initiate armed operations with the code name Horridoh in this region. Albanian nationalist groups participated in these operations, among them a Cham battalion of ca. 1,000 men under the leadership of Nuri Dino. The death toll from these operations, which began on 1 January 1944 in the region of Konispol, was 500 Albanians.

=== Cham participation in the resistance ===
As the end of World War II drew near, a small number of Muslim Chams became part of the Greek People's Liberation Army (ELAS), as well as the anti-fascist National Liberation Army of Albania. In May 1944, ELAS formed a mixed battalion with Chams the IV "Ali Demi" battalion, named after a Cham Albanian who was killed in Vlora fighting against the Germans. At the time of its creation in 1944, it had 460 men, both Cham Albanians and Greeks. The results were disappointing and in a 1944 proclamation ELAS noted that: "Mazar and Nuri Dino found easy prey for their fascist plans in great part of the Cham people, which was thirsty for national liberation".

=== Axis retreat and flight of Chams ===
During the summer of 1944, when the German withdrawal was imminent, the right-wing head of the National Republican Greek League (EDES), Napoleon Zervas, asked the Cham Albanians to fight against his rivals, the Communist-controlled EAM-ELAS. After their negative response, and in pursuit of orders given by the Allied forces to EDES to push them out of Greece and into Albania, fierce fighting occurred between both sides. According to British reports, the Cham bands managed to flee to Albania with their full equipment, together with half million stolen cattle and 3,000 horses, leaving only the elderly members of the community behind.

On 18 June 1944, EDES forces with Allied support launched an attack on Paramythia. After short-term against a combined Cham-German garrison, the town was finally liberated. Soon after, violent reprisals were carried out against the town's Muslim community, which was considered responsible for the massacre of September 1943.

The number of the Cham victims during this operation is unknown, although it is certain that the remaining Chams who had not already fled to Albania were forced to move. British officers described it as "a most disgraceful affair" involving "an orgy of revenge" with the local guerrillas "looting and wantonly destroying everything". The British Foreign Office reported that "The bishop of Paramythia joined in the searching of houses for booty and came out of one house to find his already heavily laden mule had been meanwhile stripped by some andartes".

== Aftermath and war crimes trials ==
In the post-war years a number of trials concerning the war crimes committed during the Axis occupation occurred, however not a single defendant was arrested or imprisoned, as they had already fled the country. Nevertheless, some of the prominent Cham Albanian collaborators retained close contact with former officers of Nazi Germany after the war. Niri Dino lived in Germany and had a small business in Munich, where he kept contact with the former German Lieutenant Colonel Josef Remold. Rexhep Dino escaped to Turkey. Also numerous Cham representatives who found refuge in the People's Republic of Albania were imprisoned as "collaborators of the occupation forces", "war criminals" and "murderers of the Greeks" by the local regime.

During 1945, a Special Court on Collaborators in Ioannina condemned 1,930 Cham collaborators in absentia to death (decision no. 344/1945). The next year the same court condemned an additional 179. At the Nuremberg trials, General Hubert Lanz reported that the executions and the reprisal missions were part of "war regulations", however he admitted utter ignorance about the executions in Paramythia. In 1948 the Greek National Bureau on War Crimes ordered juridical research on the crimes committed by Italians, Albanians and Germans during the Axis occupation. Two days later, the immediate arrest of the defendants was ordered. Because all the defendants were abroad it is unknown if the Greek Foreign Ministry initiated the needed diplomatic procedure. In the Hostages Trial in Nuremberg (1948) the American judges called the executions in Paramythia "plain murder".

== Sources ==
- Baltsiotis, Lambros (2011). "The Muslim Chams of Northwestern Greece: The grounds for the expulsion of a "non-existent" minority community". European Journal of Turkish Studies. Social Sciences on Contemporary Turkey (12). European Journal of Turkish Studies. doi:10.4000/ejts.4444.
- Kretsi, Georgia (2002). "The Secret Past of the Greek-Albanian Borderlands. Cham Muslim Albanians: Perspectives on a Conflict over Historical Accountability and Current Rights". Ethnologia Balkanica.
- Manta, Eleftheria (2009). "The Cams of Albania and the Greek State (1923 - 1945)". Journal of Muslim Minority Affairs. 4 (29).
- Meyer, Hermann Frank (2008). Blutiges Edelweiß: Die 1. Gebirgs-division im zweiten Weltkrieg [Bloodstained Edelweiss. The 1st Mountain-Division in WWII] (in German). Ch. Links Verlag. ISBN 978-3-86153-447-1.
- Close, David H. (1993). The Greek civil war, 1943-1950: studies of polarization. Routledge. ISBN 978-0-415-02112-8.
- Fischer, Bernd Jürgen (1999). Albania at War, 1939-1945. C. Hurst & Co. Publishers. ISBN 978-1-85065-531-2.
- Frei, Norbert (2006). Transnationale Vergangenheitspolitik: der Umgang mit deutschen Kriegsverbrechern in Europa nach dem Zweiten Weltkrieg [Past International Policy: Associations with German War Crimes in Europe after the Second World War (in German). Wallstein Verlag. ISBN 978-3-89244-940-9.
- Kallivretakis, Leonidas (1995). "Η ελληνική κοινότητα της Αλβανίας υπό το πρίσμα της ιστορικής γεωγραφίας και δημογραφίας [The Greek Community of Albania in terms of historical geography and demography." In Nikolakopoulos, Ilias, Kouloubis Theodoros A. & Thanos M. Veremis (eds). Ο Ελληνισμός της Αλβανίας [The Greeks of Albania]. University of Athens.
- Mazower, Mark (2000). After The War Was Over: Reconstructing the Family, Nation and State in Greece, 1943-1960. Princeton University Press. ISBN 978-0-691-05842-9.
- Roudometof, Victor (2002). Collective memory, national identity, and ethnic conflict: Greece, Bulgaria, and the Macedonian question. Greenwood Publishing Group. ISBN 978-0-275-97648-4.
- Russell King; Nicola Mai; Stephanie Schwandner-Sievers, eds. (2005). The New Albanian Migration. Sussex Academic Press. ISBN 978-1-903900-78-9.
- Katsikas, Stefanos (27 August 2021). Islam and Nationalism in Modern Greece, 1821-1940. Oxford University Press. ISBN 978-0-19-065202-9.
- Ktistakis, Giorgos (2006). Περιουσίες Αλβανών και Τσάμηδων στην Ελλάδα: Aρση του εμπολέμου και διεθνής προστασία των δικαιωμάτων του ανθρώπου' [Properties of Albanians and Chams in Greece: Nullification of the State of War and international protection of human rights] (PDF). Center of Studying of Minority Groups.
- Nachmani, Amikam (1990). International intervention in the Greek Civil War: the United Nations Special Committee on the Balkans, 1947-1952. Greenwood Publishing Group. ISBN 978-0-275-93367-8.

== See also ==
- Collaboration in World War II
- Collaborationism
- Schutzmannschaft
