= Napoleon Zervas =

Hellenic Army officer (1891-1957)

General Napoleon Zervas
- Ναπολέων Ζέρβας
- Napoleon Zervas in uniform.
- Born: 17 May 1891; Arta, Kingdom of Greece
- Died: 10 December 1957 (aged 66); Athens, Kingdom of Greece
- Burial place: First Cemetery of Athens
- Spouse: Aikaterini Zerva
- Military career
- Allegiance: Kingdom of Greece; Provisional Government of National Defence; Second Hellenic Republic
- Branch: Hellenic Army (Greece) EDES
- Service years: 1910–1920; 1922–1926; 1928–1941; 1941–1946 (EDES)
- Rank: General
- Unit: 2nd Infantry Division
- Commands: Leader of EDES
- Conflicts: Balkan Wars: First Balkan War; Second Balkan War; World War I: Macedonian front; World War II: Battle of Greece; Greco-Italian War; Greek Resistance; Operation Harling; Expulsion of Cham Albanians; Greek Civil War: Dekemvriana
- Other work: Member of Party of Liberals (pre-war); Founder of the National Party of Greece (post-war); Twice representative of Ioannina district in the Hellenic Parliament; Minister for Public Order; Minister of Public Works

Napoleon Zervas (Greek: Ναπολέων Ζέρβας; May 17, 1891 – December 10, 1957) was a Hellenic Army officer and resistance leader during World War II. He organized and led the National Republican Greek League (EDES), the second most significant (after EAM), in terms of size and activity, resistance organization against the Axis Occupation of Greece.

== Early life and army career ==
Zervas was born in Arta, Epirus, but his ancestors were from the village of Souli. The Zervas family belonged to one of the famous Souliot clans, who pioneered the struggles against Ali Pasha and many of them were chieftains during the years of the Greek War of Independence. Zervas' mother was Evanthia Konstantopoulou. After finishing high school in 1910, he volunteered for the 2nd Infantry Division. During the Balkan Wars, he was promoted to the rank of first sergeant. Later he attended the Hellenic Army NCO School and graduated as sergeant major in 1914.

Zervas was a Venizelist, and in 1916 was among the first to join the venizelist Movement of National Defense in Thessaloniki. He served with distinction in many battles of the Macedonian front during World War I, being eventually promoted to major. After the defeat of Venizelos' Liberal Party in the elections of 1920, he fled to Constantinople. He only returned to Athens in late 1922, after the Revolution of September 1922, and rejoined the army.

Three years later, after the establishment of General Theodoros Pangalos' dictatorship (June 1925), he was appointed as garrison commander of the city of Athens and at the same time, took command of the Second Battalion of the Republican Guard. These troops served as the main strongholds of Pangalos' military regime in the capital. Nevertheless, Zervas participated in the coup d'état of 22 August 1926, led by General Georgios Kondylis, that overthrew Pangalos. Zervas, however, confronted Kondylis a month later, when the new strongman sought to disarm and dissolve the Republican Guard. Bloody battles took place in Athens between Zervas' battalion and the governmental forces. After his defeat, Zervas was sentenced to life in prison. However, two years later, the newly established republican government of Eleftherios Venizelos (the Liberals' government of 1928–1932), granted him amnesty and Zervas was named lieutenant colonel in retirement.

== Occupation and resistance ==
=== Establishment of EDES ===
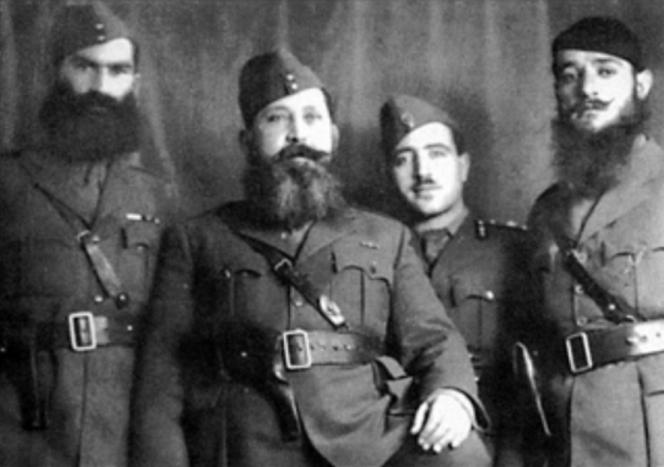
Napoleon Zervas with other EDES leaders.

In September 1941, a few months after the start of the Axis Occupation of Greece, Zervas, along with other Venizelist army officers and political figures, founded the National Republican Greek League (EDES). The goals of EDES were the fight against the conquerors of Greece, the abolition of the Greek monarchy and the establishment of a republic on social-democratic principles. The two most guiding principles for Zervas was hatred of the House of Glücksburg together with an equally intense hatred of communism. The party platform of EDES talked of a "republic in a socialist form", but the British historian Mark Mazower described Zervas's socialism as "only skin deep". Notably, the platform of EDES did not mention armed resistance, and only after Zervas was bribed with 24,000 gold sovereigns from an agent of the British Special Operations Executive (SOE) did he agree to take to the mountains to wage guerrilla war. Obese and a hypochondriac, Zervas was reluctant to take up the arduous life of an andarte (guerrilla), preferring to stay in Athens.

The SOE had a low opinion of Zervas's ability to lead with one agent writing bitterly of his "disregard of even elementary organisation". The same report mentioned that Zervas "hopes for the best but employs a crowd of useless officers, because it would disturb the peace to fire them...As an organiser, his value is NIL". A charming man, described by those who knew him as being like a "bland and easy-going company director", Zervas was primarily a political as opposed to a military leader. Another SOE agent wrote about Zervas that he was like: "the chairman of a provincial tramway company which is boosted and kept going but always has hanging over it the shadow of radical changes to the buses in the dim future. In the meantime, the chairman isn't doing too badly for himself, and if the future isn't too rosy, he himself is well provided for".

In August 1942, with his political advisor and second-in-command of EDES, Komninos Pyromaglou, he went to the mountains of Epirus, where he founded the military branch of EDES, the EOEA (Ethnikes Omades Ellinon Antarton, National Groups of Greek Guerrillas). Upon taking to the mountains of his native Epirus, Zervas relied primarily upon familial connections to recruit andartes. Zervas was very much a traditional guerrilla leader whose status as an archigos (leader) was based upon his charisma, and his political platform was notably vague beyond its call to restore the republic. Pyromaglou summed Zervas's philosophy of EDES as: "Faith in the Leader. All from the Leader. All for the Leader." The EDES-EOEA forces were proclaimed as combatant forces of the Allied Armies by the British General Headquarters of Middle East.

Zervas incorporated not only Republicans but increasingly also royalists into his movement, who saw EDES as the only acceptable alternative to EAM, the Communist-dominated rival resistance movement that had established itself over most of the country. EOEA's activities were largely confined to Epirus, but Zervas had some control of Aetolia-Acarnania, in the Valtos area.

=== Gorgopotamos and Epirus ===
In November 1942, the forces of EDES and those of ELAS (under the command of Aris Velouchiotis), in collaboration with a small group of British and New Zealand expert saboteurs, blew up the Gorgopotamos Bridge. Afterward the success of Operation Harling, a team of SOE agents led by "Monty" Woodhouse arrived to train his forces and arrange for arms shipments.

=== Changing Allegiances ===
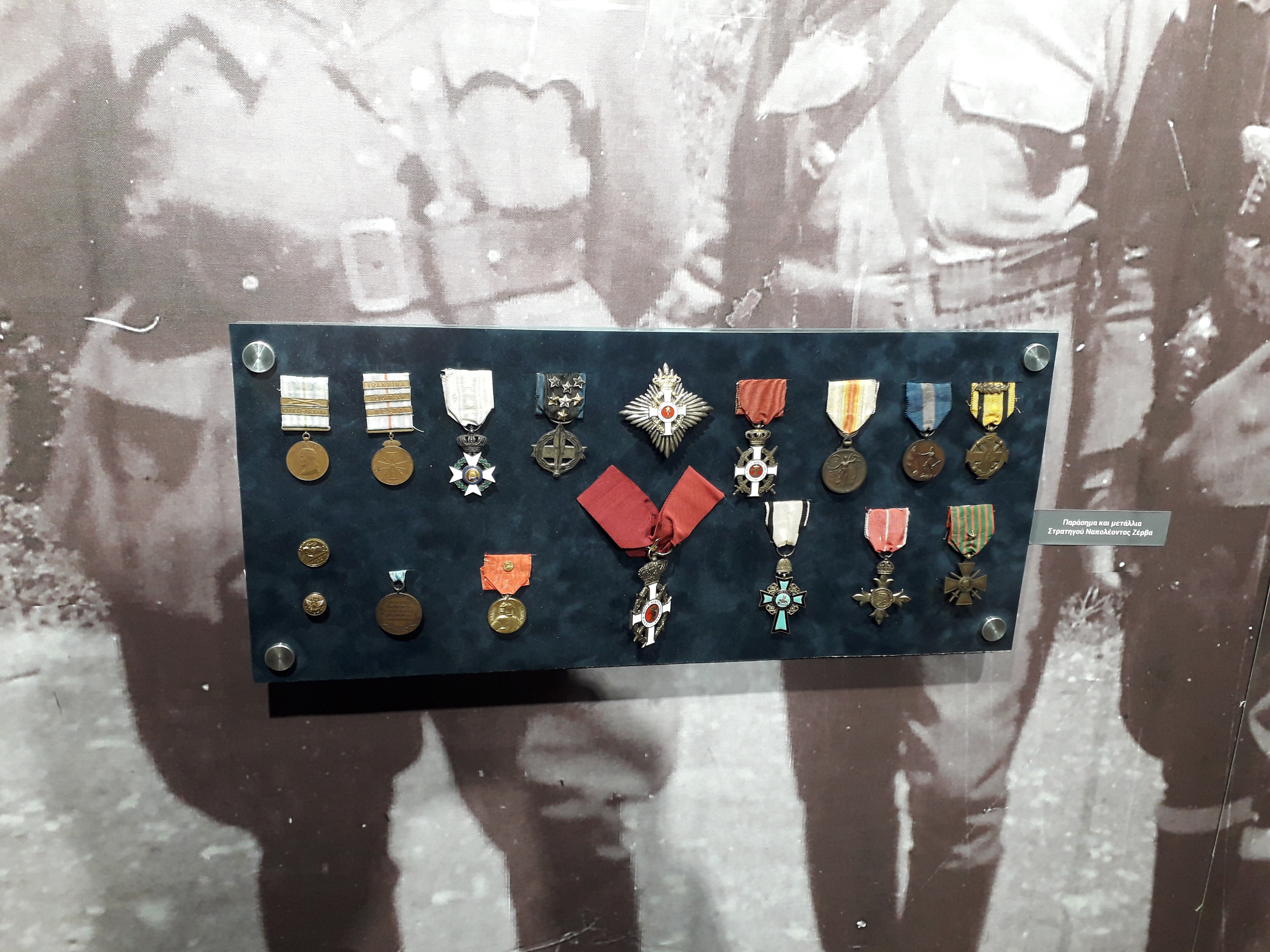
Zervas' military awards and decorations

As a republican, Zervas was naturally opposed to the government-in-exile in Cairo led by King George II, but after Woodhouse made it clear that the British were willing to increase the supply of arms if he become a royalist, on 9 March 1943, Zervas sent out a message declaring his loyalty to the king. As EDES was a republican group, Zervas's sudden conversion to monarchism shocked his followers. At the same time, Zervas warned Woodhouse of the "dark forces of Communism backed by Russia", by which he meant the rival EAM (Ethnikó Apeleftherotikó Métopo-National Liberation Front). The British substantially increased the supply of arms to EDES after Zervas proclaimed his loyalty to the king, and in course of 1943 EDES received twice the amount of weapons that EAM received from Britain. Despite the hostility of the British government to EAM and the preference for EDES, reports from the SOE indicated that EAM was the larger and more effective resistance group.

In 1943, the Allies were planning to invade Sicily. As a diversion, the British planned to trick the Germans into thinking that the Allies were planning to invade Greece, which required an increase in guerrilla attacks meant to stimulate the prelude to an invasion. By threatening to cut off the supply of arms, the SOE was able to impose the National Bands Agreement in May 1943, under which EAM and EDES agreed to stop fighting each other, and both put themselves under the command of Field Marshal Henry "Jumbo" Wilson, the supreme Allied commander in the Mediterranean. In the summer of 1943, EAM, EDES and the SOE all worked together in Operation Animals, an all-out campaign of sabotage and guerrilla attacks upon the Wehrmacht that represented exactly the sort of guerrilla campaign that the Wehrmacht expected as the prelude to an invasion. As a consequence, 8 German divisions were rushed to Greece.

=== Securing the Ionian coast and expulsion of the Chams ===
During late 1944, EDES under Zervas leadership secured the Ionian coast under British support. The subsequent operation led to the expulsion of the entire Muslim Cham Albanian minority, ca. 20,000 people, from the Greek region of Epirus. The Chams, little integrated into Christian Greek society, had been a subject of Italian-sponsored Albanian irredentism both before and during the war, while a part had collaborated with the Axis, taking part in reprisal actions against the Greek population. A small part joined the left-wing EAM-ELAS guerrillas. On 18 June 1944, EDES forces under Zervas with Allied support launched an attack on Paramythia, in Thesprotia. After a short-term conflict against the combined Cham-German forces, the town was finally liberated. The successful advance of the EDES forces continued during summer 1944. A number of violent reprisals that took part against the town's Muslim community during these developments were done without the permission of the EDES leadership. These reprisals caused most of the Cham community to flee across the border to Albania.

In the final stages of the Occupation, EDES was contained strictly in the area of Epirus, having lost Aitoloakarnania, after a mini-civil war with ELAS in 1943. During the December 1944 clashes, EDES was attacked once more by Aris Velouchiotis, and in 24 hours was obliged to leave Epirus and fled to the island of Corfu. On 15 February 1945, after the defeat of ELAS in Athens by the governmental and British forces, Zervas dissolved the remnants of his guerrilla force in Corfu.

== Post-war years ==
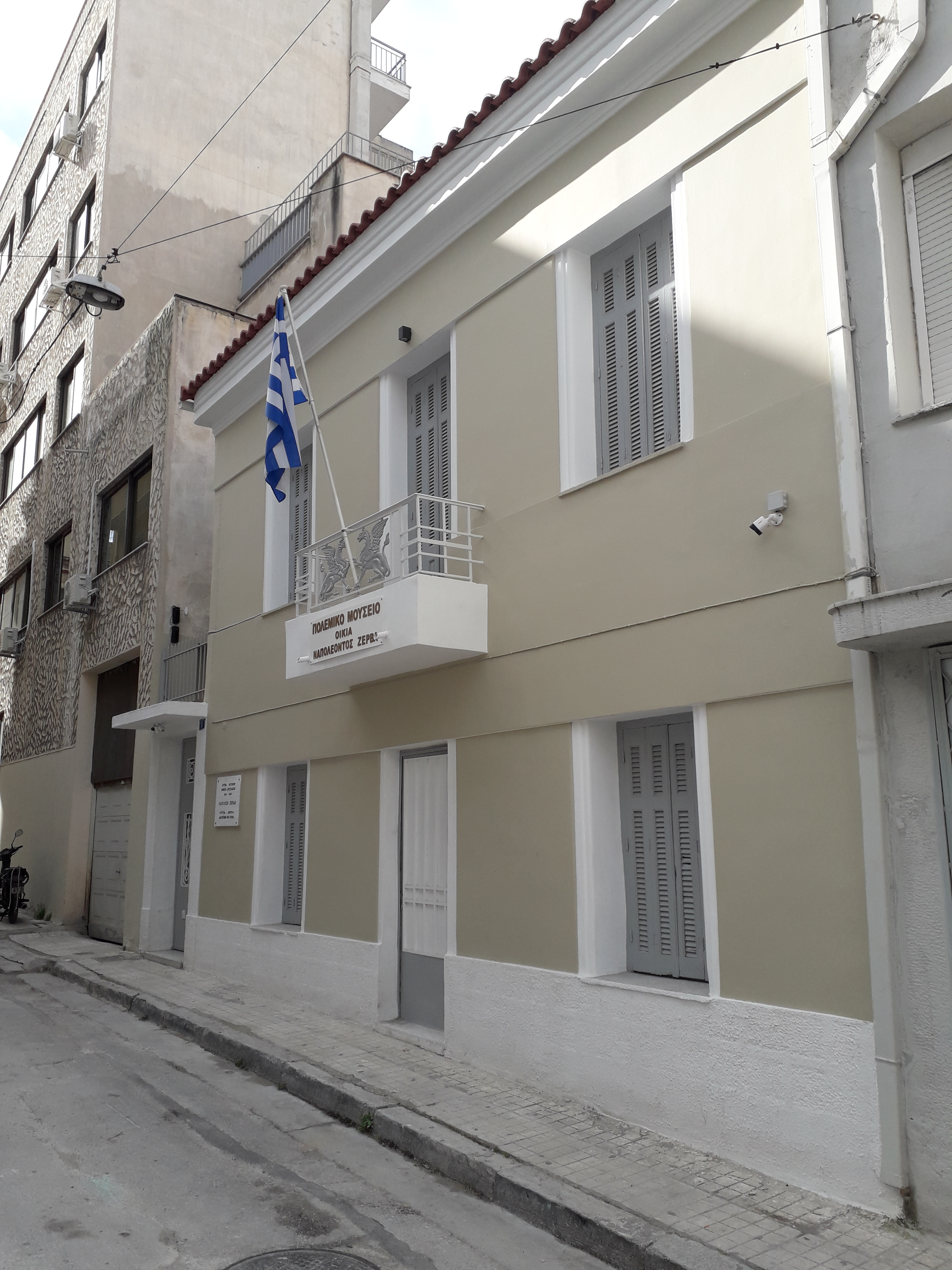
House of General Napoleon Zervas Museum

After World War II, Zervas founded the National Party of Greece and at the elections of the 31st of March 1946, he was elected as representative of the Ioannina district in the Hellenic Parliament, while his party gained 25 seats in it. Later, he participated in Dimitrios Maximos' cabinet as Minister without portfolio, from 24 January to 23 February 1947, and afterwards as Minister for Public Order until 29 August 1947.

The US and the UK opposed his appointment suspecting him of collaboration with Nazi Germany during World War II and dictatorial ambitions.

As a Minister for Public Order, Zervas initiated inefficient reforms of the gendarmerie and ordered mass arrests of Communists. When he was replaced, Dwight Griswold, head of the U.S economic mission in Greece, said "I feel he is making more Communists than he is eliminating". A few years later, Zervas merged his party with the Liberal Party and was re-elected as representative of Ioannina in the Parliament. He then served as Minister of Public Works in Sophoklis Venizelos' cabinets from 2 September 1950 to 30 September 1951, also holding the portfolio of Merchant Marine until 1 February 1951. He did not manage his reelection in the Parliament at the next elections and withdrew from politics.

He died in Athens on 10 December 1957.

In 2008, the house belonging to Zervas' second wife Aikaterini located on Kallergi 9 street in Metaxourgio was donated to the War Museum Foundation with intention of transforming it into a museum dedicated to his life. The House of General Napoleon Zervas Museum opened in November 2022, its exhibits cover Zervas' life and EDES' resistance activity.

== Books ==
- Mazower, Mark. Inside Hitler's Greece: The Experience of Occupation, 1941-44, New Haven, Yale University Press, 1993, ISBN 0300089236.
