= Komninos Pyromaglou =

Greek politician

Komninos Pyromaglou (Greek: Κομνηνός Πυρομάγλου; 1899 – 15 December 1980), was a Greek teacher and politician, and one of the driving forces behind the foundation of the National Republican Greek League (EDES), the second-largest Resistance organization in Axis-occupied Greece during World War II. Drifting to the Left after the war, he was elected to Parliament and wrote extensively on his experiences during the Occupation and the Resistance.

== Life ==
He was born in the village of Plaka in Lemnos in 1899. After studying French literature at the Sorbonne, he taught at the Anargyreio School in Spetses from 1931 to 1932, at the Modern Greek Institute in Paris from 1932 to 1934, and in the Athens Experimental School until 1938. In 1936, with the establishment of the dictatorial Metaxas Regime, he became chairman of the United Anti-Dictatorial Front and secretary of the Parties' Initiative against the regime. For this he was sent by the regime to internal exile to Sikinos. Following his release, he fled to France, where he met the exiled Venizelist and republican leader, General Nikolaos Plastiras.

In April–May 1941, Greece was overrun by German forces, and the country was occupied by the Germans, the Italians and the Bulgarians. Soon, resistance movements began to emerge, the principal one being the National Liberation Front (Greek: Εθνικό Απελευθερωτικό Μέτωπο, Ethniko Apeleftherotiko Metopo, EAM). On 9 September, the National Republican Greek League was founded with funding from the British, proclaiming the exiled and completely unaware Plastiras as its president. On the same day however, Pyromaglou left for Greece as Plastiras' representative. After arriving in Athens on September 23, he quickly established contact with officers and politicians. Napoleon Zervas then convinced him to join EDES, which was promptly reformed in October, with Pyromaglou as its General Secretary, at the head of a five-man Executive Committee.

During the Occupation, Pyromaglou continued as the head of the EDES, and became additionally General Vice-Commander of the National Groups of Greek Guerrillas (EOEA), EDES' military wing, headed by Zervas and operating chiefly in Epirus. With the foundation of the EOEA, Pyromaglou left Athens and accompanied Zervas to Epirus. In Athens, the leadership of EDES passed to the prominent Venizelist generals Stylianos Gonatas and Theodoros Pangalos, who, fearing the rise of the communist-dominated National Liberation Front (EAM), quickly became involved in collaboration with the occupation authorities. Pyromaglou remained in Epirus alongside Zervas, but became increasingly distanced by his rapprochement with the British, who supported the restoration of the Greek monarchy after the war. Pyromaglou took part as EDES' representative in the conferences held between the Greek resistance groups and the Greek government in exile at Cairo in 1943 and in Lebanon in 1944.

Following the outbreak of the Greek Civil War, in 1947 he left for France, living in Paris until 1955. He then returned to Greece, where he was president of the inter-party commission supervising the 1956 elections. In the 1958 election, he campaigned for the United Democratic Left in Athens, and was elected to the Hellenic Parliament. In 1963, he founded the tri-monthly Historical Review magazine. He died on 15 December 1980. Pyromaglou was married to Emmy Kartali sister of Georgios Kartalis (1908–1957).

== Writings ==
- Ethniki Antistasi ("National Resistance"), Athens 1947
- Ai Eklogai tis 19is Fevrouariou 1956 ("The Elections of 19 February 1956")
- O Doureios Ippos. Politiki kai Ethniki Krisis kata tin Katochi ("Trojan Horse. Political and National Crisis during the Occupation", Athens 1958
- O Georgios Kartalis kai i Epochi tou 1934–1957 ("Georgios Kartalis and his Age 1934–1957"), Athens 1965
