= EDES =

Greek resistance movement against its occupation by Germany and Italy during WWII

National Republican Greek League Εθνικός Δημοκρατικός Ελληνικός Σύνδεσμος Ethnikós Dimokratikós Ellinikós Sýndesmos
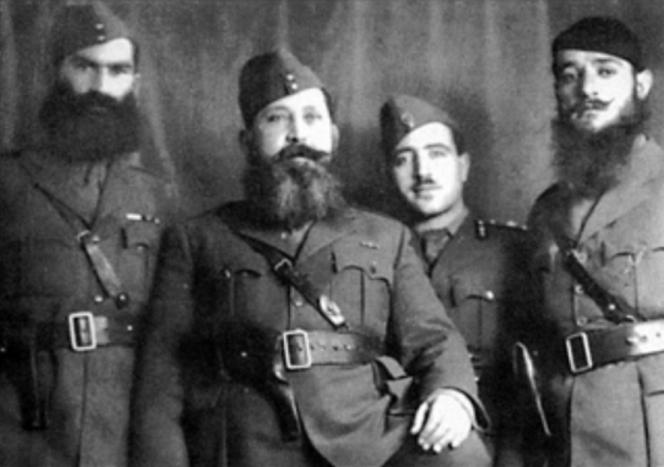
- Napoleon Zervas (2nd from left) with fellow EDES officers Fotios Zambaras (1st from left)
- Leaders: Napoleon Zervas; Komninos Pyromaglou
- Dates active: 1941–1944
- Active regions: Epirus; Aetolia-Acarnania
- Ideology: Greek nationalism Republicanism (until 1943); Venizelism (until 1943); Monarchism (after 1943); Anti-communism; Socialism (until 1943)
- Size: c. 12,000 (October 1944)
- Wars: Greek Resistance

The National Republican Greek League (Greek: Εθνικός Δημοκρατικός Ελληνικός Σύνδεσμος (ΕΔΕΣ), Ethnikós Dimokratikós Ellinikós Sýndesmos (EDES)) was an anti-Nazi resistance group formed during the Axis occupation of Greece during World War II.

The largest of the non-communist resistance groups, its military wing, the National Groups of Greek Guerrillas (Εθνικές Ομάδες Ελλήνων Ανταρτών, Ethnikés Omádes Ellínon Antartón (ΕΟΕΑ)) concentrated its military activities in Epirus. From 1943 onwards, EDES came into confrontation with the communist-led National Liberation Front, beginning a series of civil conflicts that would lead to the Greek Civil War.

== Foundation and ideology ==
The National Republican Greek League was founded on 9 September 1941 by a former army officer, Colonel Napoleon Zervas, a Venizelist who had been expelled from the army after the failed coup d'état of 1935, and two companions, Leonidas Spais and Ilias Stamatopoulos.

Like many other resistance movements founded during that time, the political orientation of the National Republican Greek League was Republican, with a strongly stated opposition towards the exiled king, George II, and general leftist-socialist proclamations. In the aftermath of the four-year right-wing widely rejected in the country, while social ideals for "social fairness" became the vogue among the various resistance groups.

The founding charter of EDES explicitly demanded the "establishment in Greece of a Republican regime, of Socialist form", the "revelation [...] of the treason of former King George II and the gang of the so-called 4th of August Dictatorship", calling for a thorough cleansing of the state and Greek social and public life from anyone "who has not proven through actions [to be] a National Republican [and have a] socialist conscience". The charter acknowledged the prominent exiled Venizelist general Nikolaos Plastiras as its nominal political head, although, due to his exile in France, they'd failed to obtain his consent beforehand. At that time, yet, no explicit reference to armed opposition against the occupying forces was made in the text.

On the same day, Komninos Pyromaglou, a friend and assistant of Plastiras, left Nice, where Plastiras resided, for Greece. He was authorize by the general to form, on his behalf, a republican organization with socialist content", and prepare to turn both "against the Occupier" and against a return of the monarchy. After his arrival in Athens on 23 September, Pyromaglou came into contact with Republican circles, and after contacting Zervas took EDES' command. In October, a five-member Executive Committee was founded, with Pyromaglou as General Secretary, representing Plastiras, and Zervas as a member.

As the organization grew, it succeeded in establishing links with the British Headquarters in Cairo, and receiving funds, weapons, and guidance. Under British pressure, in support of the Greek monarchy, Zervas sent a statement of loyalty to King George II in March 1942. This marked a silent breach with the anti-monarchist attacks of the past months, and marked EDES's turn towards a pro-monarchist stance.

The organization supported irredentism, arguing that Greece should be allowed to annex parts of Albania and Bulgaria after the war. In 1944 and 1945, following the retreat of Axis forces and their evacuation of Greece, EDES participated in the expulsion of the Cham Albanians community, on account of their collaborationist actions during the Occupation, which included atrocities and acts of ethnic cleansing against the local population. The expulsion was approved by the Middle East Allied Command, in a directive to "push [the Chams] out of Greece and into Albania." The People's Republic of Albania subsequently accused Greece of having perpetrated, through EDES, war crimes by attacking Cham villages and murdering civilians. The issue of the Cham minority remains open from the Albanian side, after the communist regime fell.

== Beginnings of armed resistance – The Gorgopotamos operation ==
Like most similar groups, EDES was initially limited to Athens. Having the support of many prominent Venizelist and Republican military figures, EDES came into contact with EAM and tried to establish some form of cooperation. The negotiations failed over the demands of the Communists for a merger of EDES with EAM and their distrust of Zervas' pro-British attitudes.

On 23 July 1942, after intense British pressure and more than a month after the official appearance of the military wing of EAM, the Greek People's Liberation Army (ELAS), Zervas, accompanied by Pyromaglou and a handful of companions, set out for the Valtos Mountains in Aetolia-Acarnania, an area with long traditions of guerrilla warfare stretching back to the Ottoman period. From then and until the end of the Occupation, Epirus would be the primary area of operations of the EDES andartes.

Supported by British parachute drops, EDES quickly gathered some 100 fighters. The first major operation of EDES was "Operation Harling", the destruction of the Gorgopotamos viaduct by a joint force of British SOE commandos, and EDES and ELAS forces. While the successful operation, one of the greatest sabotage acts in occupied Europe, greatly boosted the prestige of the nascent Resistance, it also caused a significant rift between EDES and ELAS: the British loudly proclaimed and lauded Zervas' role in the operation, while ignoring the contribution – numerically far greater – of the leftist ELAS forces. While the rift was healed by British mediation, it presaged the problems that would appear in the future.

On 24 February 1943, Zervas addressed his friend Antonis Petsakis in a letter, urging him to create a branch of EDES in Peloponnese, before ELAS establishes full control of the region. A branch of the National Groups of Greek Guerrillas (ΕΟΕΑ) was then founded in Patras and by the summer of 1943 a small armed guerilla group was formed by E. Sevastakis. The Peloponnesean branch of EDES struggled with finding weapons and ammunition, prompting Zervas to request for a British airdrop of supplies in Achaea. The airdrop did not materialize and Sevastakis' group disbanded in late July, numbering some 70 men at the time.

== List of battles ==
1942

- 23 October - 24 November: Battle against Italian forces at Skoulikaria and at wider mountainous area of Arta, during 22 days.
- 25 November: Operation Harling (Gorgopotamos).
- 20–22 December: Battle against Italian forces at Ano Kalentini - Xirokampos - Velentziko - Koufalo of Arta

1943

- 20 May: Victorious battle against Italians and Cham Albanians at Agia Kyriaki village.
- 22 June : Destruction of Spiliopotamos bridge.
- 6 July: Victorious battle against Italian alpinists at Milia, Epirus.
- 8–20 September: Battles against German forces at Metsovo, Pramada, Kalarites.
- 16,19 September: Battles against Germans and Cham Albanians at Skala Paramythias.
- 30 September: Attack against German forces at Xirovouni.
- 30–31 October: Battle against Edelweiss Division (with the eventual participation of ELAS, mainly against the EDES forces) at Tzoumerka.
- November–December: Battles against Germans and Cham Albanians at Thesprotia.

1944

- 30 March Battle in Thesprotiko against Germans and Cham Albanians.
- 29 Juny: Liberation of Paramythia and Parga.
- 30 Juny: Victorious battle against Germans and Cham Albanians at Menina.
- 11 August: Liberation of Margariti.
- 17–18 August: Conquest of Fort Menina.
- 14 September: Battle of Dodona-Liberation of Lefkada.
- 22 September: Liberation of Igoumenitsa and Filiates.
- 7–15 October: Battles against German forces.

== Accusations of collaborationism ==
Following large scale clashes between ELAS and EDES in October 1943, Zervas entered into contact with the Germans and began discussing the possibility of collaboration against ELAS. In February 1944, Zervas and XXII Mountain Corps commander Hubert Lanz reached a "gentlemen's agreement". Under its terms the two sides were to enter a truce, exchange limited information on ELAS prior to each side's military operations against the communists and enter full on collaboration in case EDES found itself on the brink of collapse. According to 1st Mountain Division officer Karl Heinz Rotfuchs, the agreement remained a secret from the absolute majority of EDES members. It was also kept secret from the British, so that EDES would continue to receive material support from the former. Upon their departure from Epirus, the Germans ensured that leftover materiel would reach the hands of EDES rather than ELAS.

The left wing Greek People's Liberation Army on various occasions accused its rival organizations, and particularly EDES, of collaboration with the occupying Nazi forces. During the armed conflicts between ELAS and EDES in Athens, a propaganda war was launched with ELAS accusing EDES of collaboration, mainly due to gaining plausibility from the explicit exemption of EDES from German propaganda attacks.

On the other hand, Stylianos Gonatas, initially a political leader of EDES in Athens, won the peculiar enmity of the organization because he supported the collaborationist Security Battalions and encouraged young officers to join their ranks, which led to hostility of the EAM groups towards him. The 12th Army of Nazi Germany attempted for a short time to coopt the EDES forces, and to use them against the ELAS, but this attempt failed and in July 1944 the EDES launched new attacks.

In August 1944, members of collaborationist organizations such as the EEE and Security Battalions began enlisting into Organization X and EDES en-masse in order to avoid persecution as liberation seemed imminent.

== The civil war within the Resistance ==
These internal conflicts caused rivalry between resistance groups and eventually escalated into civil war. In October 1943, ELAS launched an attack on EDES. These attacks triggered a civil war that would last until February 1944. After that, a fragile truce was established, which lasted until December, two months after the Liberation. Then, while the ELAS of Athens attempted to overthrow the government, other units stormed the EDES positions in Epirus. The latter was defeated and the remaining forces were evacuated to Corfu. After the defeat of the ELAS in Athens (January 1945), EDES forces returned to Epirus, where part of them got involved to the expulsion of the Cham Albanians.

== Sources ==
- Fleischer, Hagen (1990). Στέμμα και Σβάστικα: Η Ελλάδα της Κατοχής και της Αντίστασης, Τόμος Α' [Crown and Swastika: Greece of the Occupation and the Resistance, Vol. 1] (in Greek). Athens: Papazissis. ISBN 960-02-0764-X.
- Fleischer, Hagen (1995). Στέμμα και Σβάστικα: Η Ελλάδα της Κατοχής και της Αντίστασης, Τόμος Β' [Crown and Swastika: Greece of the Occupation and the Resistance, Vol. 2] (in Greek). Athens: Papazissis. ISBN 960-02-1079-9.
- Hellenic Army History Directorate (1998). Αρχεία Εθνικής Αντίστασης, 1941–1944. Τόμος 1ος "Αντάρτικες Οργανώσεις ΕΟΕΑ-ΕΔΕΣ" [National Resistance Archives, 1941–1944. 1st Volume "EOEA-EDES Partisan Organizations"]. Athens: Hellenic Army History Directorate. ISBN 960-7897-29-3.
- Hellenic Army History Directorate (1998). Αρχεία Εθνικής Αντίστασης, 1941–1944. Τόμος 2ος "Αντάρτικες Οργανώσεις ΕΟΕΑ-ΕΔΕΣ" [National Resistance Archives, 1941–1944. 4th Volume "EOEA-EDES Partisan Organizations"]. Athens: Hellenic Army History Directorate. ISBN 960-7897-30-7.
- Mark Mazower (2001). Inside Hitler's Greece – The Experience of Occupation, 1941–44. United States: Yale University Press. ISBN 0-300-08923-6.
- Stouras, Panagiotis (2016). The Greek Civil War in the Aegialia and Kalavryta Area (1946–1949) (PhD thesis) (in Greek). University of Johannesburg. pp. 1–513. hdl:10210/227069.
- Woodhouse, Christopher Montague (1948). Apple of Discord: A Survey of Recent Greek Politics in their International Setting. London.
- Center of Military History, German Antiguerrilla Operations in The Balkans (1941–1944) Washington DC: United States Army.
- The Statutes of EDES
