= Xhemil Dino =

Albanian diplomat (1894–1972)

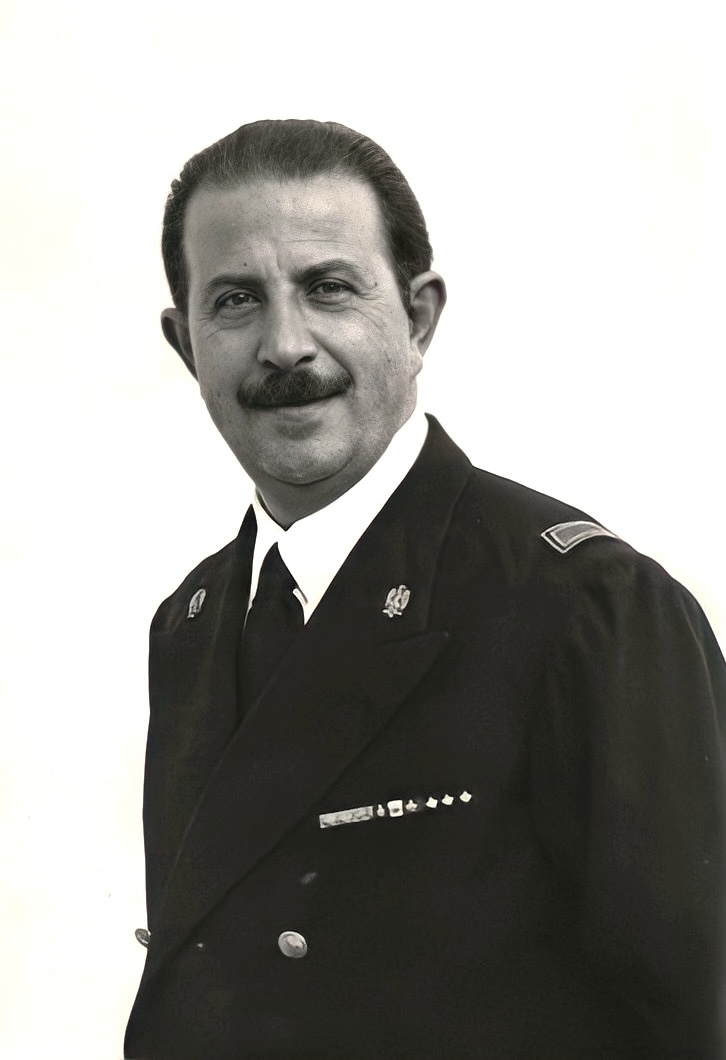
- Prime Minister: Shefqet Vërlaci

17th Foreign Affairs Minister of Albania
- In office 12 April 1939 – 25 May 1939
- Preceded by: Ekrem Libohova
- Succeeded by: Bahri Omari

Personal details
- Born: 21 December 1894 Preveza, Ottoman Empire (modern Greece)
- Died: 2 July 1972 (aged 77) Madrid, Spanish State
- Occupation: politician, diplomat
- Profession: civil servant

Xhemil Dino (21 December 1894 – 2 July 1972) was an Albanian politician and diplomat.

He was born in Preveza in the Janina Vilayet of the Ottoman Empire on 21 December 1894 to a branch of the notable Dino family of the area. In 1913 he completed his studies at the Imperial Lyceum "Gallata Saraj" in Istanbul In 1913 he studied in Galatasaray High School and in 1921 he graduated from the Faculty of Law in Rome, after the declaration of independence of Albania he was elected deputy of Dibër and later was appointed Deputy Secretary General of the Ministry of Foreign Affairs. In 1922 he was appointed Secretary of the Albanian Legation in Paris. From February 1925 to May 17 of that year, Dino was appointed Secretary General of the Ministry of Foreign Affairs. It was at this time that he was decorated by the President of France with the title "Officer of the Legion of Honor". He was briefly removed from diplomacy after being elected a deputy, but in 1926 he served as chargé d'affaires in Bucharest. A few months later, he was appointed Minister Plenipotentiary of Albania in Rome, where he served for four years. He was a delegate from Albania to the Sixth, Seventh and Eighth Assembly of the League of Nations (1925–1927). In 1931, he was appointed Minister Plenipotentiary in London, while after the death of Iljaz bey Vrion, he also served as Resident Minister for France with residence in London. This appointment did not last long, after the suicide of his wife he was asked to resign. In the fall of 1934, he married the daughter of Shefqet bey Vërlac, the former fiancée of HMT Zog I. He then resumed his diplomatic service, being appointed Minister of Albania in Sofia in 1936 and was still there during the Italian occupation.

On 12 April 1939 he was appointed Minister of Foreign Affairs in the Vërlaci government, a position he nominally held until June of that year, when the agreement giving Italy control over Albania's foreign relations came into effect. After the dissolution of the Albanian foreign service, Dino was appointed Ambassador by the Italian Foreign Service, but was not appointed to any post. After occupied by the Axis forces (1941–1944), Xhemil Dino was appointed the High Commissioner of Thesprotia (Cameria) and actively collaborated with the Italian and German forces. He fled Albania at the end of 1944. He finally went to exile in Franco's Spain in 1945. He died on 2 July 1972 in Madrid and was buried in Rome.
