= Castle of Saint Andrew =

Fortress in Preveza, Greece

- κάστρο του Αγίου Ανδρέα
- Preveza, Epirus, Greece
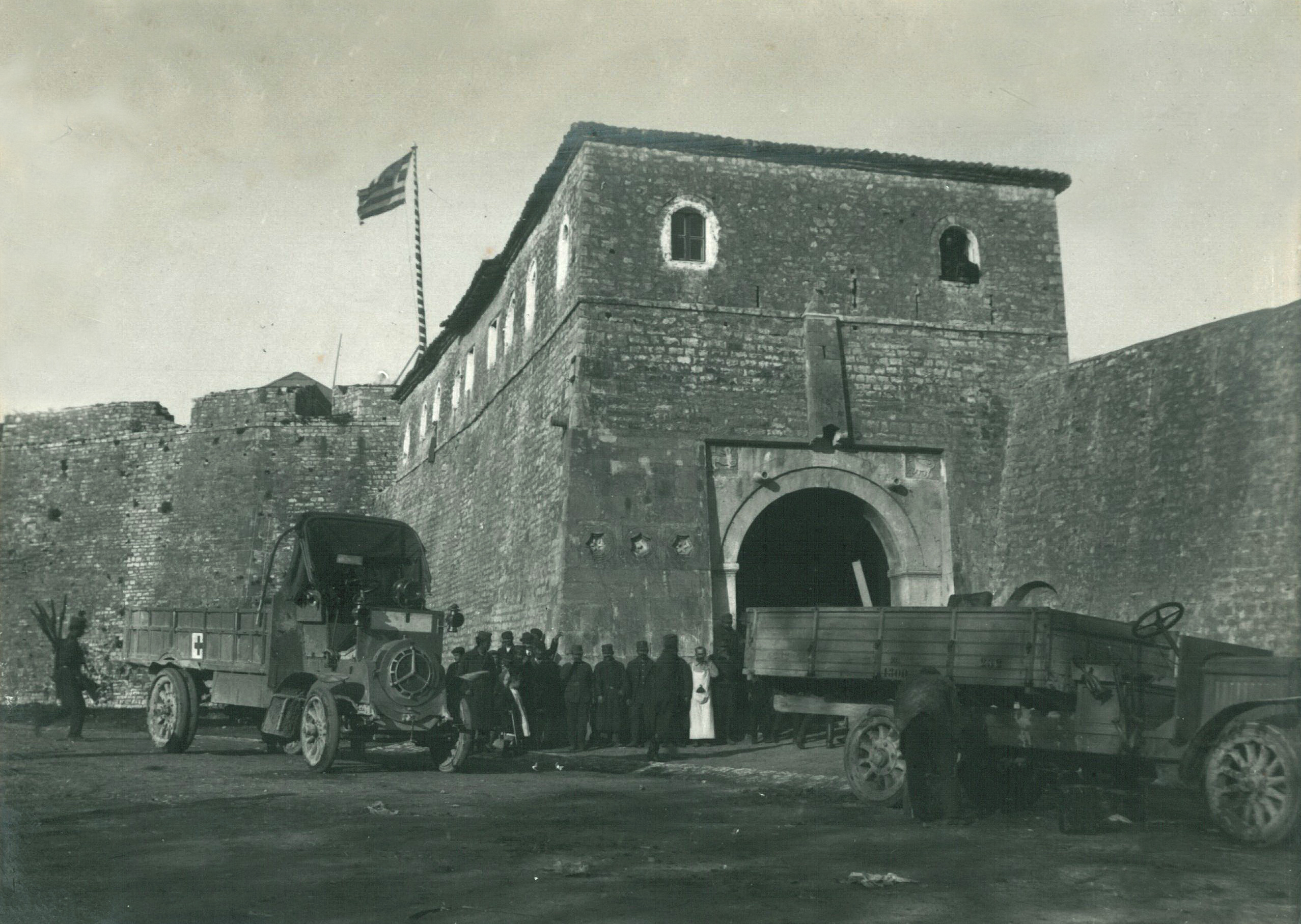
- Main gate of the castle in 1912

Site information
- Type: citadel
- Owner: Greek Ministry of Culture
- Controlled by: Ottoman Empire early 1700s-1717; Republic of Venice 1717–1797; Ottoman Empire 1798–1912; Greece 1912–1973
- Condition: Ruin

Location
- Coordinates: 38.9605°N 20.7533°E

Site history
- Built: early 1700s
- Materials: hewn stone (ashlar)
- Demolished: 20th century
- Battles/wars: Battle of Nicopolis (1798)
- Events: Seventh Ottoman-Venetian War

The Castle of Saint Andrew (Greek: κάστρο του Αγίου Ανδρέα) is a fortress in Preveza, Greece. First constructed by the Ottoman Empire in the early 1700s, it was expanded under Venetian rule in 1718–1797 and again under the autonomous regime of Ali Pasha of Yanina in 1807–1808 to become the largest of the several fortifications in the Preveza area.

== Name ==
The castle was known in Ottoman times as Iç Kalesı (lit. 'Inner Castle'), as well as 'Castle of the Plane Tree' (Φρούριο του Πλατάνου) and 'Castle of the Roots' (Ριζόκαστρο). It derives its modern name from a church dedicated to Saint Andrew that existed in it during Venetian times.

== History ==
The first fortress of Preveza was the Castle of Bouka, built by the Ottoman Empire in the 1486/7, a decade after the Ottoman conquest of the region. This castle was razed by the Venetians in 1701, when they were obliged to return Preveza to Ottoman control by the terms of the Treaty of Karlowitz. As a result, the Ottomans did not rebuilt the old fort, but erected a new one, some 800 metres (2,600 ft) further north at a site reported in Venetian sources as Sto Chiparissi (Greek for 'at the cypress tree').

A Venetian engineer attached to the fleet drew a sketch of the castle in 1702, according to which it was a square structure, with a square bastion at each corner. The stone-built curtain walls were about 200 metres (660 ft) long, and the walls of each of the four sides of the bastions another 25 metres (82 ft) long. The wall was not very tall—about 1 metre (3.3 ft)—nor very thick—about 1.7 metres (5.6 ft), and was reinforced with wooden stakes that protruded about 1.7 metres (5.6 ft) from the wall. A moat was dug around the fort, and the excavated earth dumped between it and the stone wall, forming a second defense line. The erection of the new fortress, and centre of the Ottoman administration, also had the effect of drawing the city northwards, as the local inhabitants began building their homes in close proximity to it.

The Venetian admiral Andrea Pisani captured the relatively weak fortress on 22 October 1717, during the Seventh Ottoman-Venetian War; the Venetians immediately started strengthening the defences, widening the moat by about 1 metre (3.3 ft). They also converted the garrison's mosque into a church, and dedicated it to Saint Andrew, likely in honour of Pisani. During the Venetian occupation, the size of the castle was reduced in half. In 1797, Preveza and the castle came under French rule, which lasted until October 1798, when Ali Pasha of Janina routed the small French garrison in the Battle of Nicopolis. The castle barely played a role in the battle: it was small and in a very poor state, as well as being indefensible due to the nearby houses being higher than its walls.

In 1807–1808, Ali Pasha extensively refortified Preveza, including a city wall and the foundation of a number of other fortresses in the region, such as St. George's Castle; This reconstruction gave the Castle of Saint Andrew its present form. The most significant change was the construction of a second, smaller wall on the seaward side of the castle, thus enclosing the harbour quarter of the city in a fortified circuit of about 60 metres (200 ft) by 250 metres (820 ft), pierced by three gates. Ali also tore down the church of St. Andrew and erected a small mosque in its place.

The outer wall was gradually demolished in the 20th century, while the interior of the main castle, used by the Hellenic Army as a base for several decades, lost all its original structures.

== Sources ==
- Brooks, Allan (2013). Castles of Northwest Greece: From the Early Byzantine Period to the Eve of the First World War. Huddersfield: Aetos Press. ISBN 978-0-9575846-0-0.
- Curlin, James S. (2010). "«Remember the Moment when Previsa fell»: The 1798 Battle of Nicopolis and Preveza". Preveza B. Proceedings of the Second International Symposium for the History and Culture of Preveza (16–20 September 2009). Vol. I. Preveza: University of Ioannina, Municipality of Preveza, Actia Nicopolis Foundation. pp. 265–296. ISBN 978-960-99475-1-0.
- Karabelas, Nikos D. (2012). "Ottoman Fortifications in Preveza in 1702. The First Phase of the Castle of Iç Kale". Journal of the Center for Ottoman Studies. 32 (2). Ankara: 47–66. ISSN 1019-469X.
- Karabelas, Nikos D. (2015). "Η οχύρωση του εξωτερικού περιβόλου του κάστρου του αγίου Αντρέα της Πρέβεζας". Πρεβεζάνικα Χρονικά (in Greek). 134–178 (51–52).
- Phourikis, Petros A. (1929). "Νικόπολις–Πρέβεζα, Β′ Πρέβεζα" [Nicopolis–Preveza, II. Preveza]. Ηπειρωτικά Χρονικά (in Greek). 4. Ioannina: 263–294. ISSN 1108-4758.
- Phourikis, Petros A. (1930). "Νικόπολις–Πρέβεζα, Γ′ Χριστιανικά μνημεία Πρεβέζης" [Nicopolis–Preveza, III Christian monuments of Preveza]. Ηπειρωτικά Χρονικά (in Greek). 5. Ioannina: 211–228. ISSN 1108-4758.
- Savvides, Alexis G. (1995). "Preveze". In Bosworth, C. E.; van Donzel, E.; Heinrichs, W. P. & Lecomte, G. (eds.). The Encyclopaedia of Islam, Second Edition. Volume VIII: Ned–Sam. Leiden: E. J. Brill. pp. 334–335. ISBN 978-90-04-09834-3.
