= Kantza =

Kantza (Greek: Καντζα) may refer to the following places in Greece:

- Kantza, Attica, a settlement located east of Paiania, East Attica
  - Paiania–Kantza station, an Athens Suburban Railway and Athens Metro station
- Stefani, Preveza, previously Kanza
