= Stefani, Preveza =

Stefani Στεφάνη
- Community
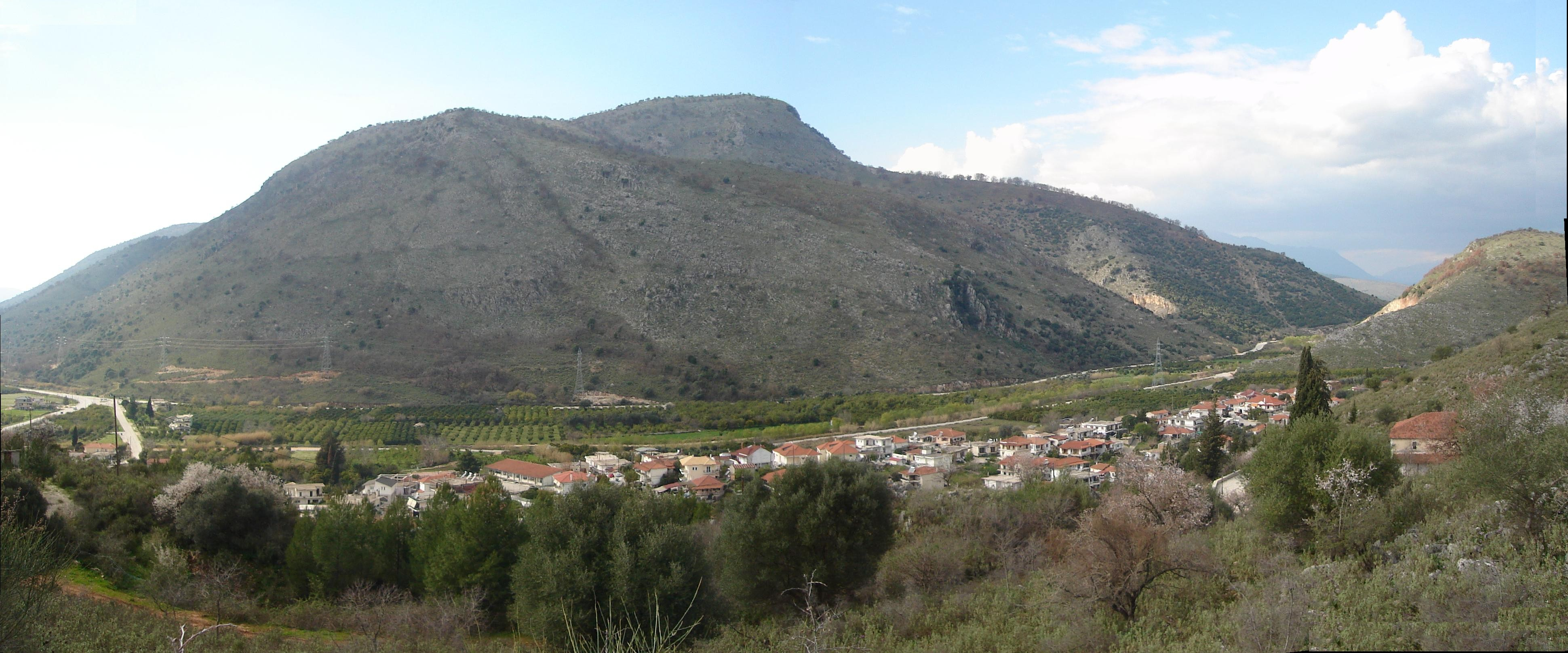

- Location within Greece
- Coordinates: 39°15′N 20°47′E
- Country: Greece
- Administrative region: Epirus
- Regional unit: Preveza
- Municipality: Preveza
- Municipal unit: Louros

Population (2021)
  - Community: 379
- Time zone: UTC+2 (EET)
  - Summer (DST): UTC+3 (EEST)

Stefani (Greek: Στεφάνη, before 1927: Καντζάς - Kantzas) is a village in the municipal unit of Louros, Preveza regional unit, Greece. In 2021 Stefani had a population of 379. Stefani is situated at the foot of steep hills, near the right bank of the river Louros. It is 4 km northeast of Louros (village), 8 km southwest of Filippiada and 25 km north of Preveza. The Greek National Road 21 (Filippiada - Preveza) passes south of the village.

== History ==
The village was first mentioned by the historian George Finlay as the Kantza narrows: when the Souliotes were sent as aid to Peta they were attacked by the Turks there in August 1822 during the Greek War of Independence.

North the village the ruins of ancient Batia (Βάτια), which was settled by the Eleans in the 7th century BC, have been found. Geographically, it lies in the area of ancient Cassope.

In the area around Stefani flint stone tools from the Middle Paleolithic Age, a Hellenistic fortress and a Roman aqueduct of Nicopolis have been found. The Stone Age tools are preserved in the Archaeological Museum of Ioannina.

== See also ==
- List of settlements in the Preveza regional unit
