= Louros =

Louros Λούρος
- Municipal unit
- Location within the regional unit

- Location within Greece
- Coordinates: 39°10′N 20°45′E
- Country: Greece
- Administrative region: Epirus
- Regional unit: Preveza
- Municipality: Preveza

Area
  - Municipal unit: 176.1 km^{2} (68.0 sq mi)

Population (2021)
  - Municipal unit: 3,987
  - Municipal unit density: 22.64/km^{2} (58.64/sq mi)
  - Community: 1,769
- Time zone: UTC+2 (EET)
  - Summer (DST): UTC+3 (EEST)
- Vehicle registration: ΡΖ

Louros (Greek: Λούρος) is a town and a former municipality in the Preveza regional unit, Epirus, Greece. It was the center of a kaza of the Preveza Sanjak under the Ottoman Empire. Since the 2011 local government reform it is part of the municipality Preveza, of which it is a municipal unit. The seat of the municipality was the small town of Louros (pop. 1,769 in 2021). The area of the municipal unit is 176.075 km^{2}, with a population of 4,581 people (2011). The town and municipal unit are named after the river Louros which flows just south of the town. Until recently, the Louros valley was swampy, but in modern times the marshes were drained and are now used for the production of olives, oranges, lemons and tomatoes. Besides the town of Louros itself, the largest communities in the municipality are Oropós (pop. 1,127), Stefáni (379), Vrysoúla (149), Áno Ráchi (96), and Kotsanópoulo (200).

== Subdivisions ==
The municipal unit Louros is subdivided into the following communities (constituent villages in brackets):

- Ano Rachi
- Kotsanopoulo (Ano Kotsanopoulo, Kato Kotsanopoulo)
- Louros
- Neo Sfinoto
- Oropos (Neos Oropos)
- Revmatia (Revmatia, Kato Revmatia)
- Skiadas (Skiadas, Aloni, Kontates)
- Stefani
- Trikastro
- Vrysoula
