= Skiadas =

Skiadas Σκιαδάς
- Community
- Location within Greece
- Coordinates: 39°19′N 20°44′E
- Country: Greece
- Administrative region: Epirus
- Regional unit: Preveza
- Municipality: Preveza
- Municipal unit: Louros

Population (2021)
  - Community: 76
- Time zone: UTC+2 (EET)
  - Summer (DST): UTC+3 (EEST)

Skiadas (Greek: Σκιαδάς) is a small mountain village in the Preveza regional unit in northwestern Greece. It is part of the Louros municipal unit. It is built upon the mountain Baldenezi, at 500 metres (1,600 ft) above sea level.

Skiadas took that name because according to the Greek mythology the Greek God of the dead, Hades, would sometimes come out of his underworld (which its supposed entrance is only a few miles away from Skiadas at the nearby Serziana village) to seek for some daily light. However, because he was sensitive to sunlight, he preferred to stay near Skiadas where sun does not shine before 11 AM and there is plenty of shadow (because of a high mountain in front of the village). "Skiadas" means "the shadow of Hades" (in Greek: Σκιά του Άδη).

During the Greek enslavement by the Turkish Empire, Skiadas and its surrounding villages have seen very little of the burden, as Skiadas is part of the Souli valley which resisted the Turkish rule for hundreds of years by brewing many local fighting heroes.

Census data shows the population of Skiadas has declined over the years. In 1981, the population was 294, and ten years later it dropped to 169. As of 2021, Skiadas has a population of 76 inhabitants. Most have left for Germany, Athens or nearby towns to seek better employment as the sole profession one could have in its rocky mountain is sheep and goat herding.
