= St. George's Castle, Preveza =

Ottoman fortification in Preveza, Greece

St. George's Castle (Preveza)
- Κάστρο Aγίου Γεωργίου
- Preveza, northwestern Greece
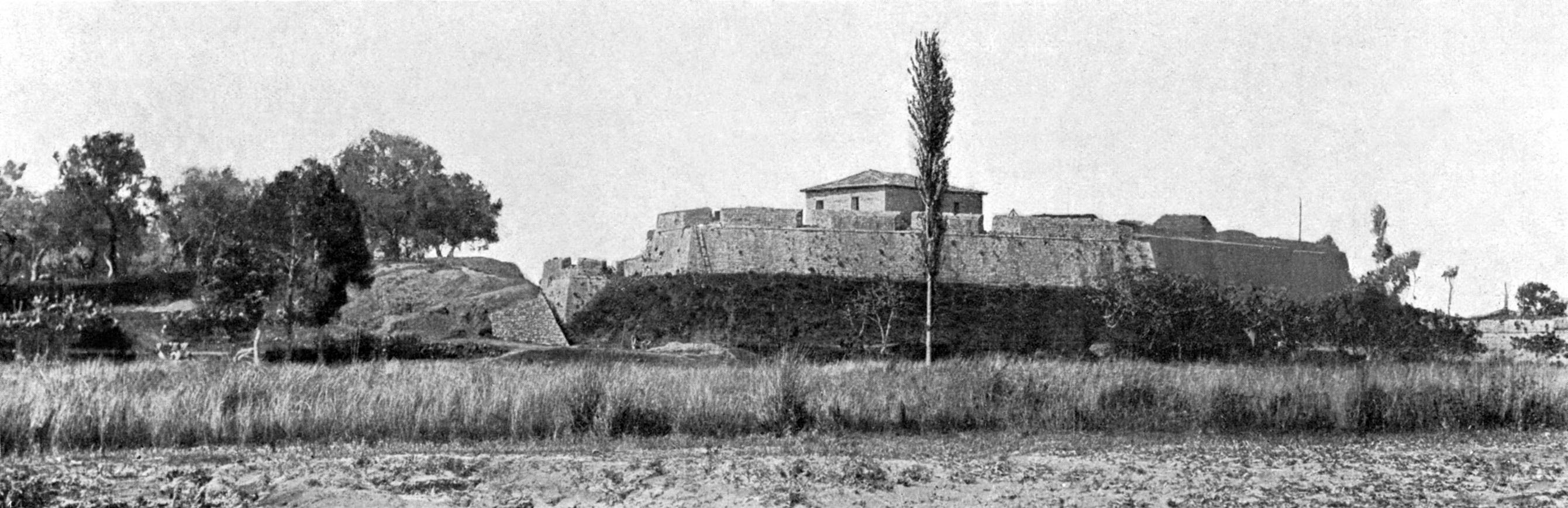
- St. George's Castle, Preveza (1911 photograph from the south)

Site information
- Condition: good

Location
- Coordinates: 38°56′55″N 20°45′0″E

Site history
- Built: 1807
- Built by: Ali Pasha of Ioannina
- Materials: stone

St. George's Castle (Greek: Κάστρο Αγίου Γεωργίου, romanized: Kastro Agiou Georgiou; Turkish: Yeni kale, or Hizir kalesi) is an Ottoman fortification located in the city of Preveza, northwestern Greece. It was built in 1807, during the rule of Ali Pasha of Ioannina over the region (1806-1820), and it was constructed on plans drawn by the French engineer Frédéric François Guillaume de Vaudoncourt (1772-1845).

== History ==
The castle was built in 1807, when the region was governed by Ali Pasha of Ioannina, a semi-autonomous Ottoman ruler of Epirus. It was the first major architectural intervention of Ali Pasha in Preveza, after he recaptured it in late November 1806.

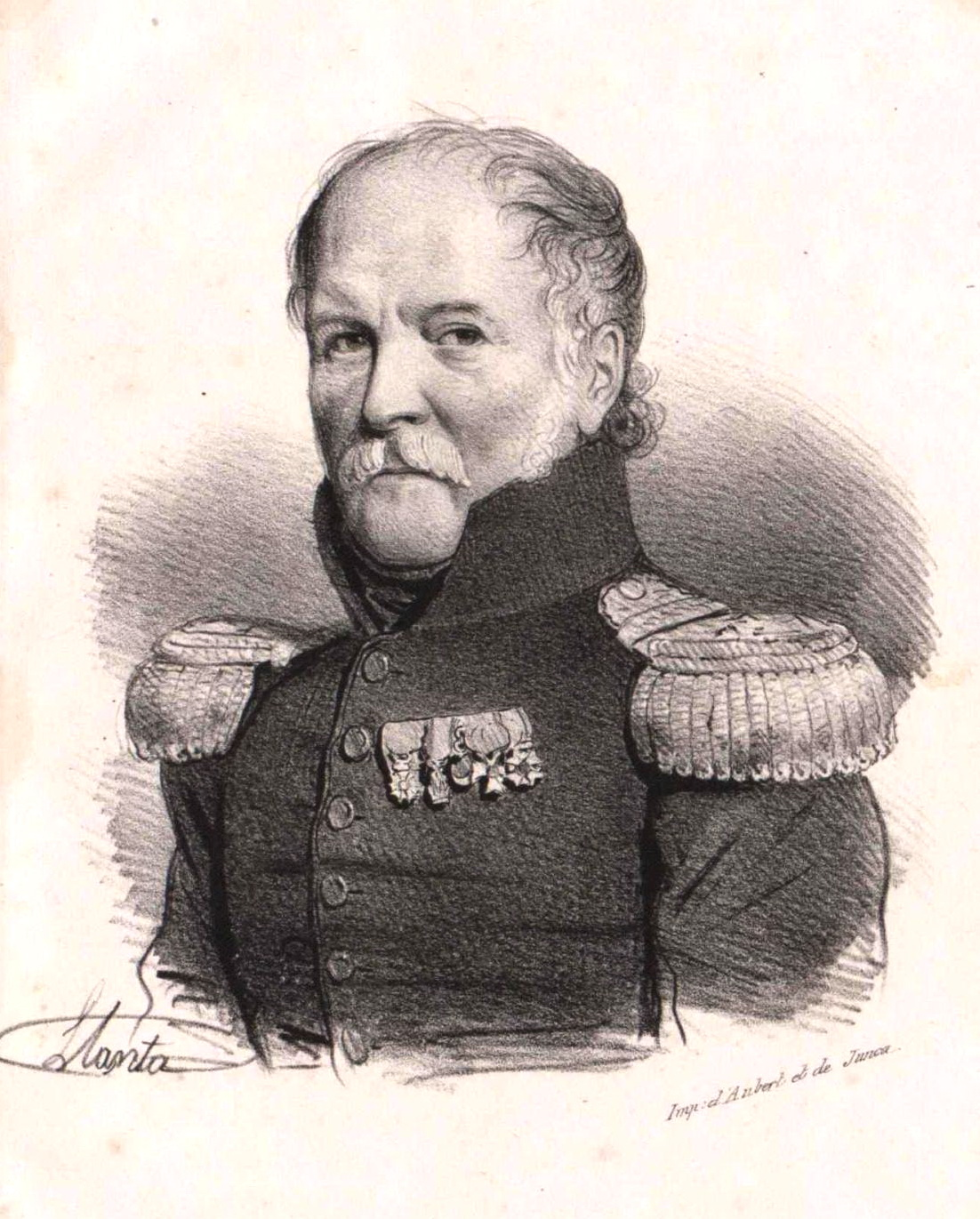
The designer of the castle, Frédéric François Guillaume de Vaudoncourt.

Ali Pasha pressed François Pouqueville, the French consul stationed in Ioannina, to send for officers and supplies from Napoleon’s troops, as he was particularly interested in securing military engineers who could assist in the construction of new fortifications in the region, and particularly at Preveza and the camps positioned against the Russian troops still stationed on Lefkada. The castle was initially called by the Ottomans Yeni kale (lit. 'new castle'), but a few years later (around 1815) another castle took this name, as it was newer than the one we are talking about. The castle was afterwards named Hizir kalesi ('green castle') or ('barracks castle').

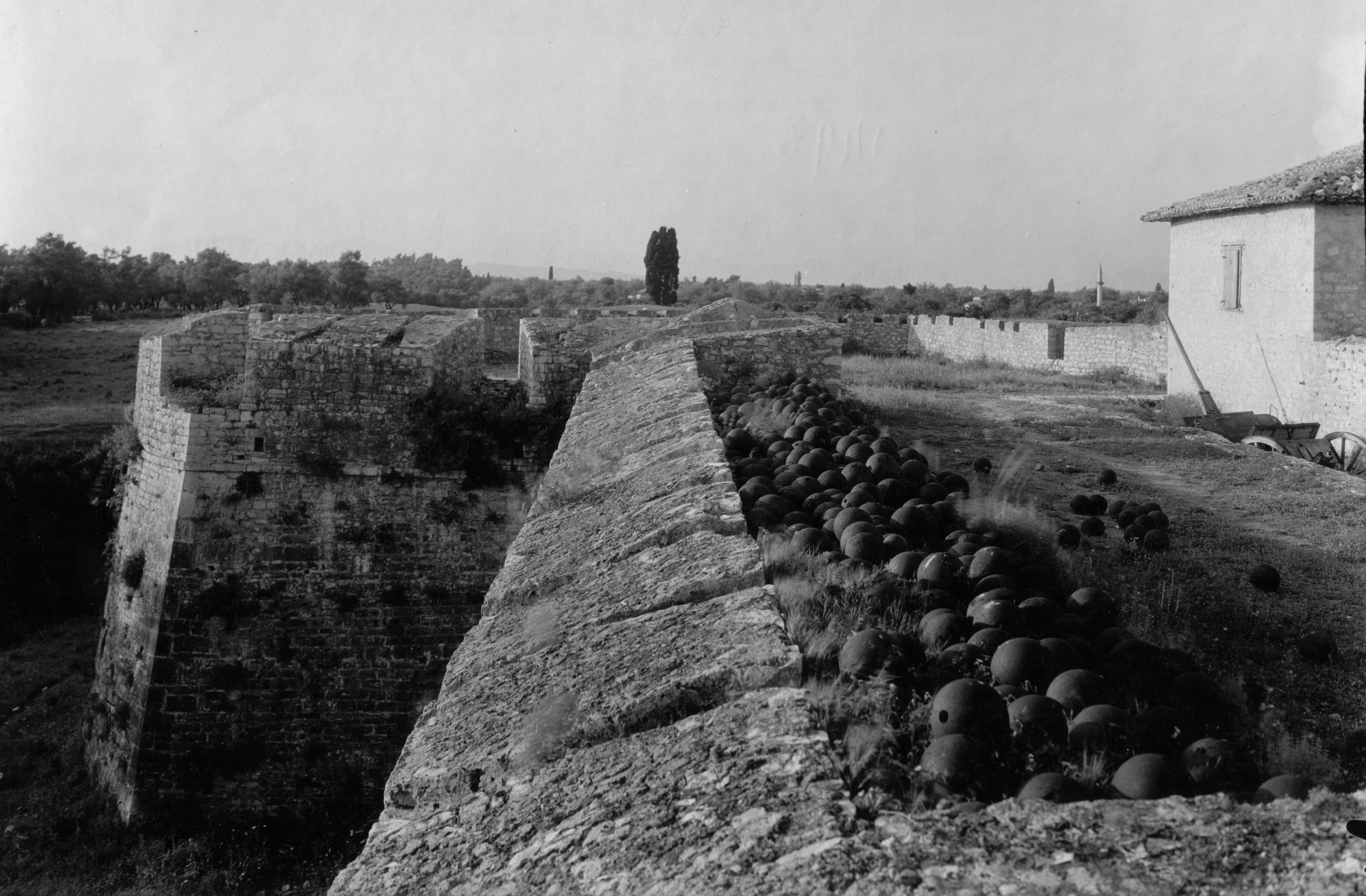
The castle of St. George's in Preveza. Photograph by Frédéric Boissonnas, May 1913.

St. George's castle, as it was named after 1912, was designed by French engineers, who also oversaw the construction of the fort. It was constructed at the southern edge of Preveza in order to defend the narrow water channel leading from the Ionian Sea into the Gulf of Arta.

For the construction, Ali Pasha hired two French military engineers; Captain Ponceton, and colonel Frédéric François Guillaume de Vaudoncourt, to assist in the design and execution of the plan. He, also, brought in several hundreds of Greek workers and stonemasons from many areas of his territory, who worked by compulsory labour and without pay for the project, which was concluded in less than a year's time.

It seems likely that Ali Pasha refused to realize de Vaudoncourt's proposed designs, thus taking all the credit for constructing the military works in Preveza.

Based on the hand-written reports of de Vaudoncourt we can precisely date the construction of the castle. The works started in February 1807 and were completed in the autumn of the same year.

== The castle today ==
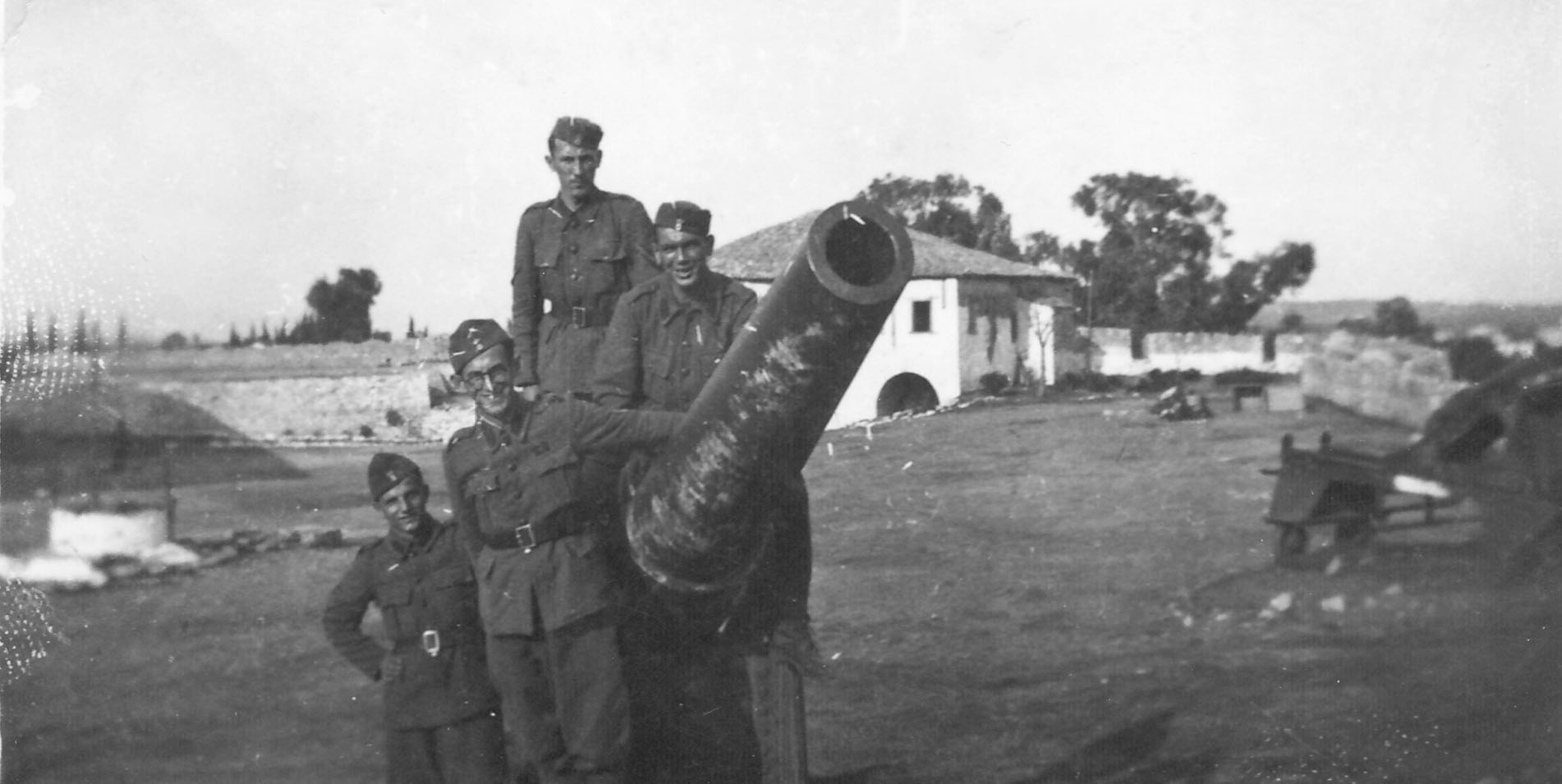
The enclosure of St. George's castle, Preveza. Behind the cannon, the guardhouse above the main entrance of the castle. Photograph of c.1930.

Today, the castle consists of a single enclosure protected by high polygonal bastions. As was typical for fortifications from this time, the walls of the enceinte were set at a slight angle so as to better deflect artillery fire. Although the majority of the original early nineteenth-century structure survives, some aspects of the fort’s defensive features have been modified to accommodate the fortification’s use by the Greek military into the twentieth century. For example, some of the battery platforms were excavated and the bastions were pierced to create better-protected casemates. Also, all service buildings within the enclosure appear to be completely of twentieth-century manufacture, with the exception of a small masonry building that leads down to a powder magazine. The main entrance to the fort is set at the north-eastern corner of the enclosure, facing the center of the town. Historic photographs record the fact that there was a guardhouse, now lost, situated above the main entrance.

== Relevant Links ==
- «The castles of Preveza's Prefecture from above», by epirustravel.eu. Aerial views of Preveza's castles taken with a drone.
