= Preveza =

City in Epirus, Greece

Preveza Πρέβεζα
- Municipality
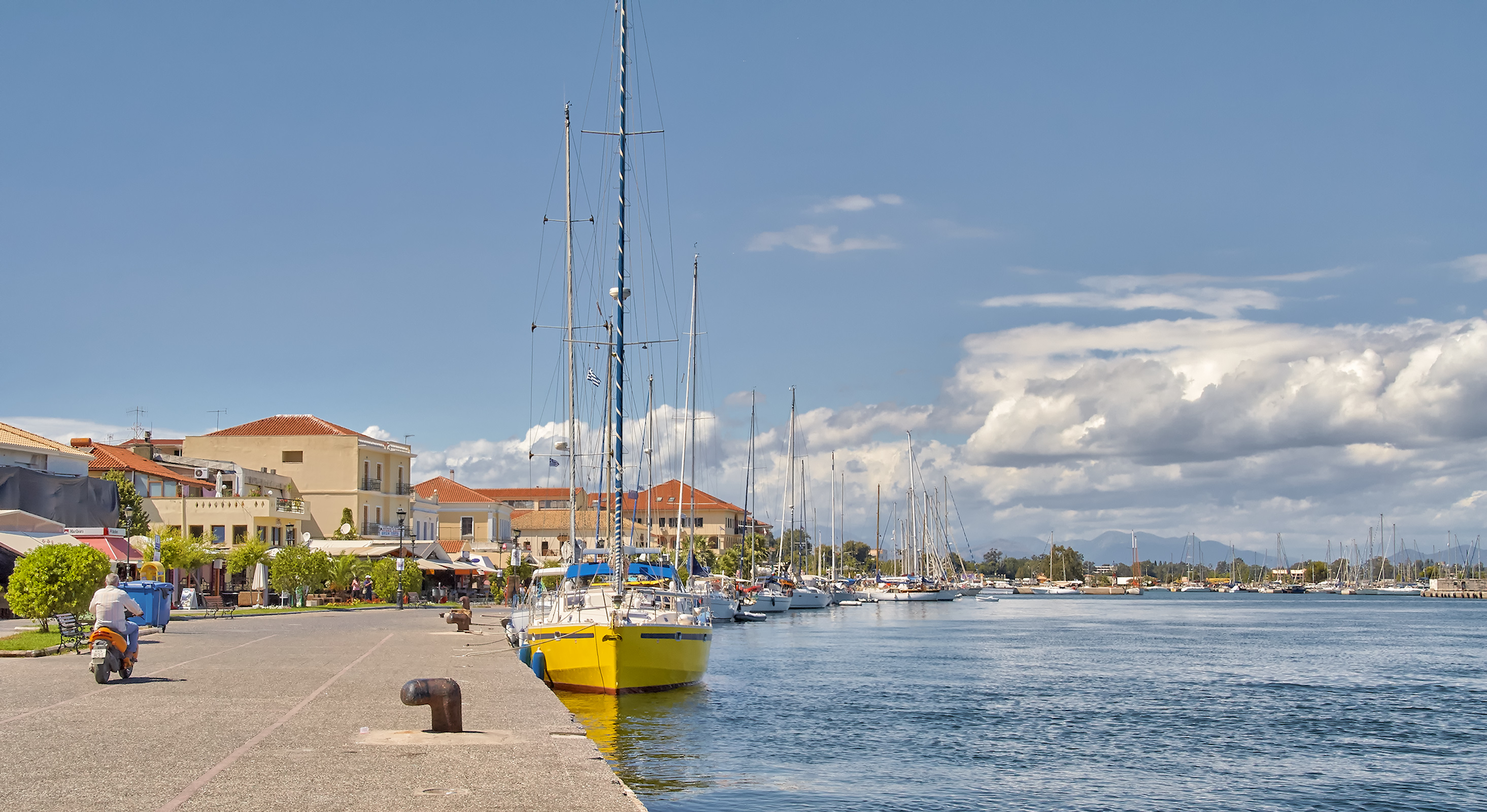
- The promenade and port

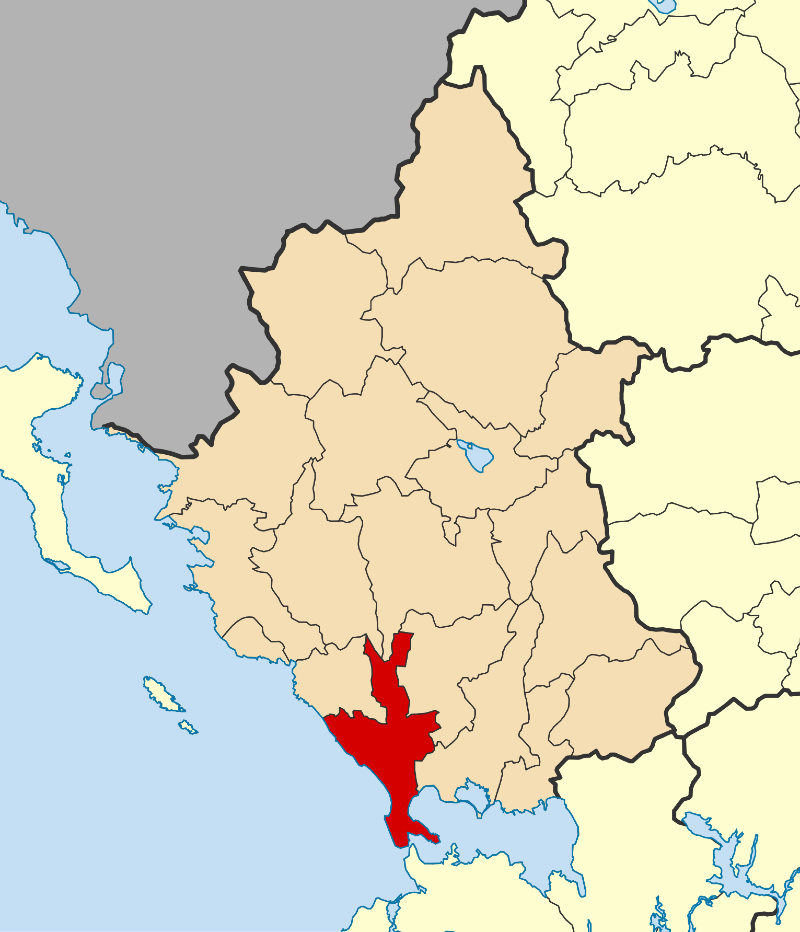

- Location within Greece
- Coordinates: 38°57′27″N 20°45′06″E
- Country: Greece
- Administrative region: Epirus
- Regional unit: Preveza

Government
  - Mayor: Nikolaos Georgakos (since 2019)

Area
  - Municipality: 380.5 km^{2} (146.9 sq mi)
  - Municipal unit: 66.8 km^{2} (25.8 sq mi)
- Elevation: 8 m (26 ft)

Population (2021)
  - Municipality: 30,841
  - Density: 81.05/km^{2} (209.9/sq mi)
  - Municipal unit: 22,868
  - Municipal unit density: 342/km^{2} (887/sq mi)
  - Community: 21,099
- Demonym: Prevezian
- Time zone: UTC+2 (EET)
  - Summer (DST): UTC+3 (EEST)
- Postal code: 481 00
- Area code: 26820
- Vehicle registration: ΡΖ
- Website: www.dimosprevezas.gr

Preveza (Greek: Πρέβεζα, pronounced [ˈpreveza]) is a city in the region of Epirus, northwestern Greece, located on the northern peninsula of the mouth of the Ambracian Gulf. It is the capital of the regional unit of Preveza, which comprises the southern part of Epirus. Preveza is connected to Aktio in Central Greece by the Aktio-Preveza Immersed Tunnel, the only undersea tunnel in Greece. The ruins of the ancient city of Nicopolis lie 7 kilometres (4 miles) north of Preveza.

== Etymology ==
Despite the fact that the name Preveza is attested in the Chronicle of the Morea (Greek: Πρέβεζα, Italian: Prevesa, French: la Prevasse, la Prevesse), in the narratives referring to the suppression of the rebellious prince of the Despotate of Epirus, Nikephoros I, which occurred in 1290, this does not prove that the city existed in that period. The name is commonly regarded as originally deriving from the Slavic word prěvozъ, meaning 'passage', but transmitted via an Albanian form prevëzë, 'transportation, crossing'. These words correspond to the ancient Greek word pereosis (Greek: περαίωσις), which means passing across, pointing to it as a likely ultimate origin of the name.

An alternative derivation is that proposed in 1857 by Panagiotis Aravantinos as coming from the Italian word prevesione, which means 'provision, supply'. Aravantinos' proposal has no solid foundations, according to recent academic views.

== Administration ==
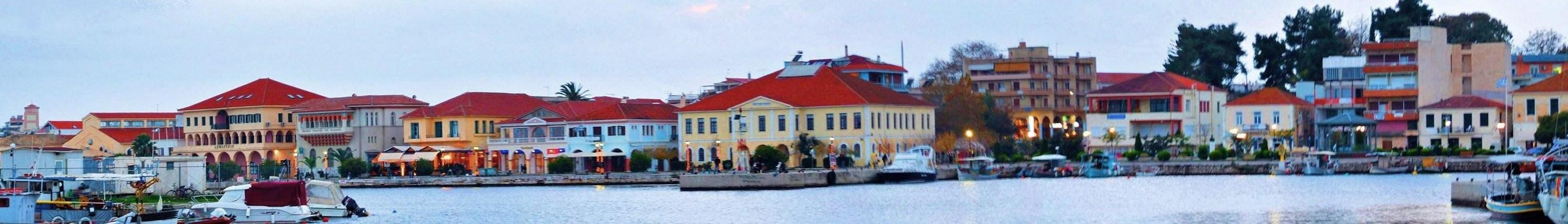
View of the port of Preveza, seen from the East

The present form of the Municipality of Preveza was established in 2011, through the Reform Legislation for Local Government, which merged the following three former municipalities, which in turn became its Municipal Units. (The constituent communities are mentioned in brackets):

- Former Municipality of Louros (Ano Rachi, Kotsanopoulo, Louros, Neo Sfinoto, Oropos, Remmatia, Skiadas, Stefani, Trikastro, Vrysoula)
- Former Municipality of Preveza (Flamboura, Michalitsi, Mytikas, Nicopolis, Preveza)
- Former Municipality of Zalongo (Cheimadio, Eklissies, Kamarina, Kanali, Kryopigi, Myrsini, Nea Sampsounta, Nea Sinopi, Riza, Vrachos)

The municipality has an area of 380.541 km^{2}, the municipal unit 66.835 km^{2}.

== History ==
=== Antiquity ===
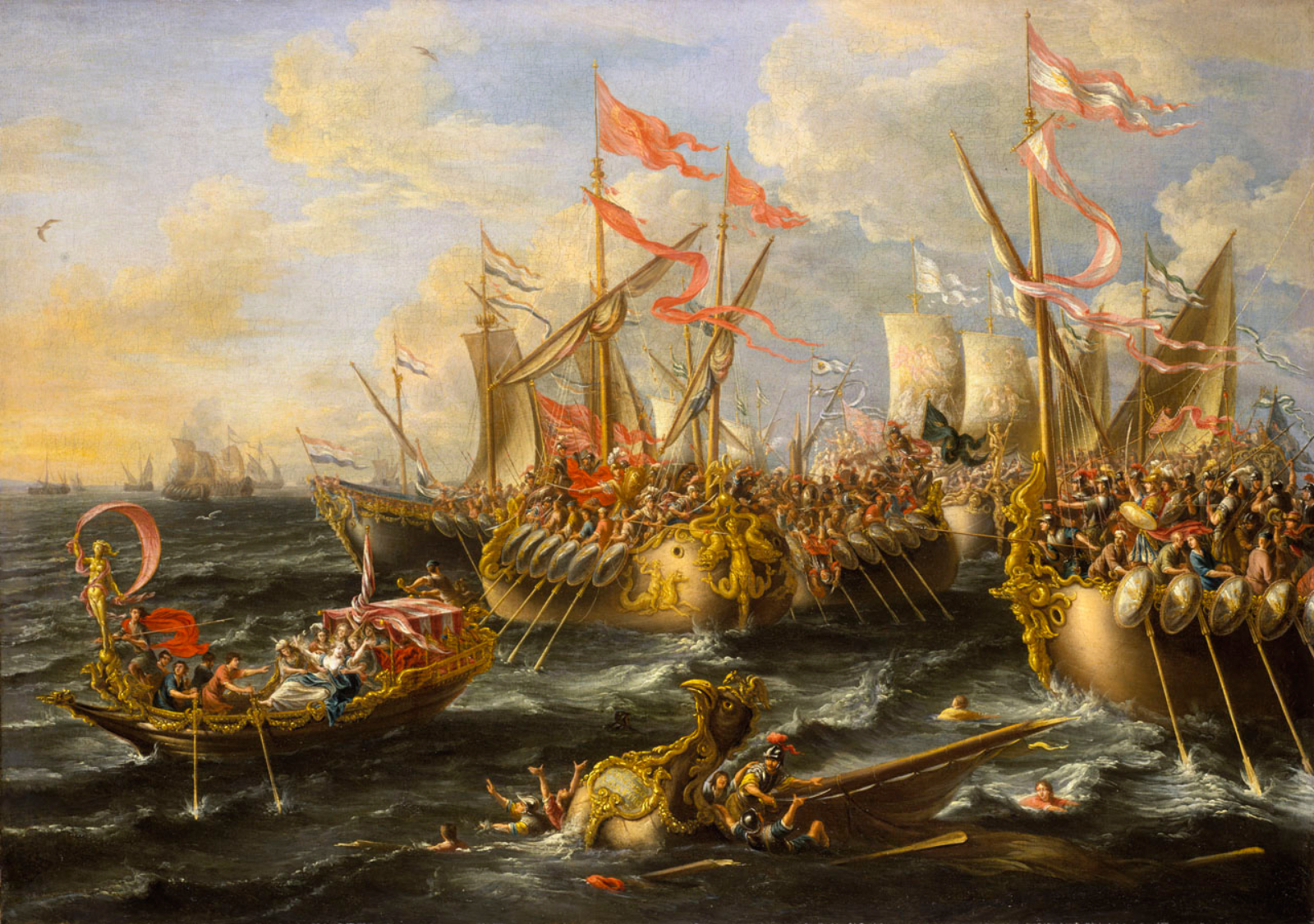
The Battle of Actium, by Laureys a Castro (1672); oil painting in National Maritime Museum of Greenwich, London (Director's Office)

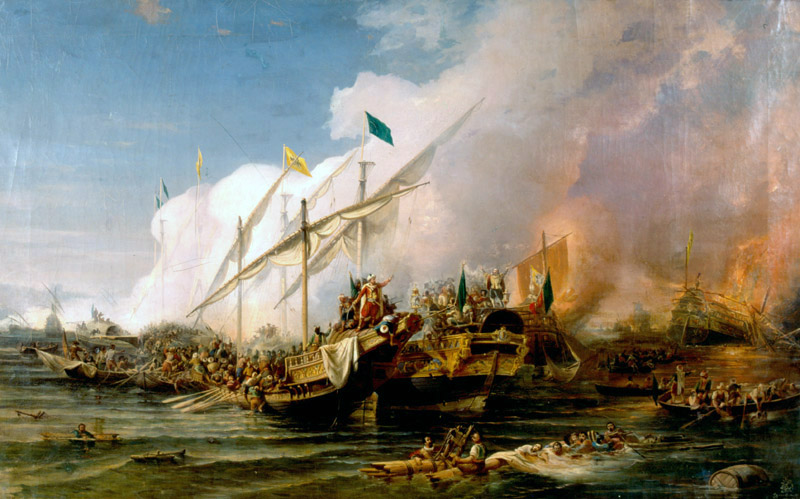
The Battle of Preveza (1538) by Ohannes Umed Behzad, painted in 1866

In antiquity, the south-southwestern part of Epirus was inhabited by the Greek tribe of Cassopeans, part of a larger tribe, the Thesprotians. Their capital city was Cassope (today, near the village of Kamarina). At the southernmost part of Epirus, king Pyrrhus founded, in 290 BC, the town of Berenike or Berenice, named after his mother-in-law Berenice I of Egypt. Today, it is believed that Berenike lies on the hills near the village of Michalitsi, following the excavations by Sotirios Dakaris in 1965. The Ionian Sea, near Berenike, was the site of the naval Battle of Actium, on 2 September 31 BC, in which Octavian's forces defeated those of Mark Antony and queen Cleopatra of Egypt. The city of Nicopolis (Νικόπολις, "Victory City") was built nearby by Augustus to commemorate his victory. The city is believed to have, at its peak, a population of 150,000. In AD 90, Epictetus arrived at Nicopolis, after he had been banished by the Roman emperor Domitian and established a school of philosophy. One of his students Arrian became a famous historian and recorded all of his works.

=== Medieval period ===
The name Preveza was first attested in the Chronicle of the Morea for the year 1292, when the Genoese allies of Byzantine emperor Andronikos II Palaiologos raided its port of Saint Nicholas. However, it likely dates to the abandonment of Nicopolis after the Uzes raids in Greece in the 1060s.

Preveza is not mentioned thereafter until the 15th century, indicating that it was likely abandoned or was of negligible importance. No medieval monuments survive, either. The modern city likely traces its sources to a foundation (or at least fortification) after the Ottoman conquest of the region, likely c. 1486–1487, followed by a second fortification in 1495. Therefore, it is most unlikely that Preveza constitutes the continuation of ancient Nicopolis, as earlier scholars have suggested.

=== First Ottoman period ===
The Ottomans refounded Preveza probably in 1477, with a subsequent strengthening of the fortifications in 1495. The naval Battle of Preveza was fought off the shores of Preveza on 29 September 1538, where the Ottoman fleet of Hayreddin Barbarossa defeated a united Christian fleet under the Genoese captain Andrea Doria. This day is a Turkish Navy National Holiday, and some of today's Turkish submarines are called "Preveze".

=== Venetian intervention ===
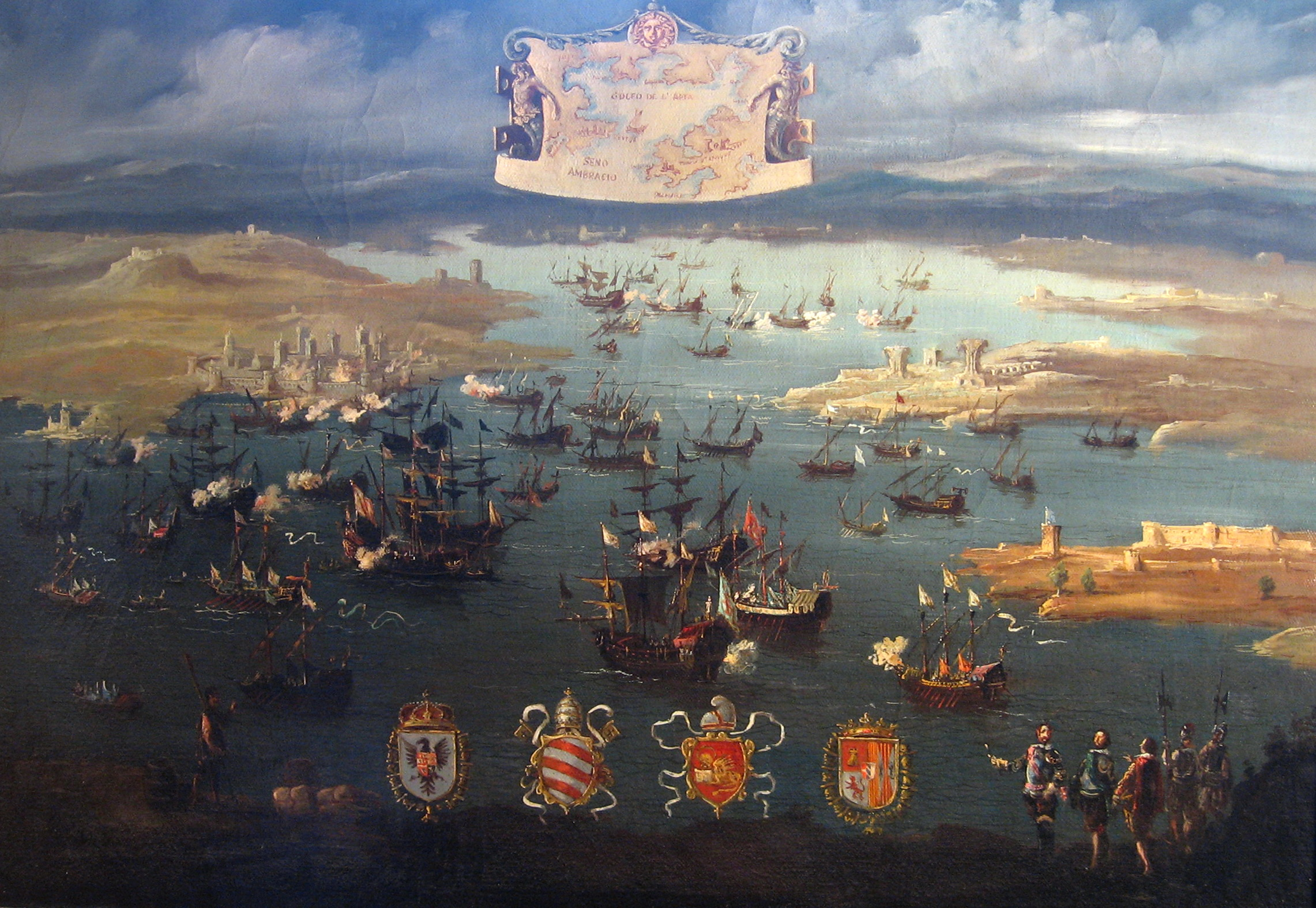
The conquest of Preveza by unknown painter (17th century)

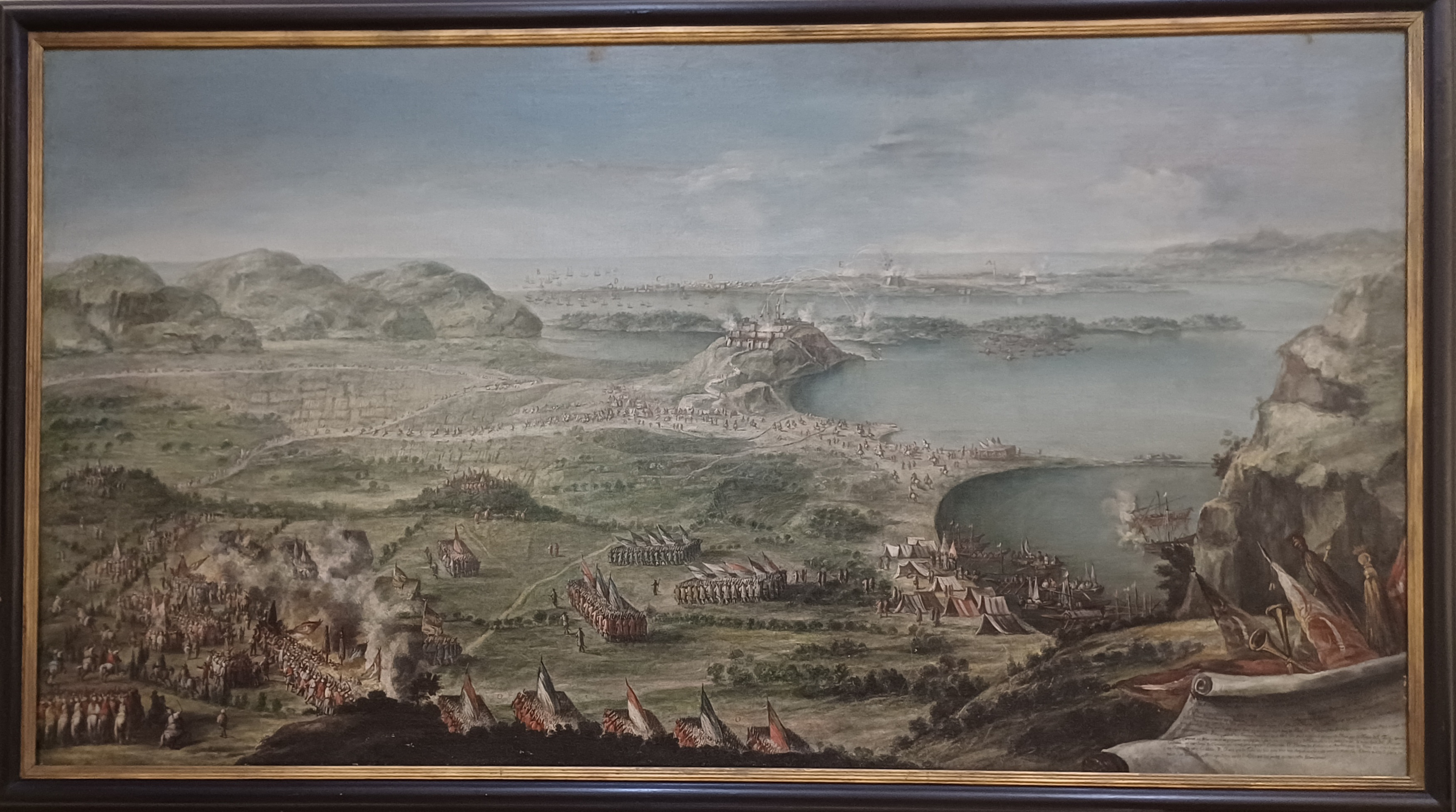
Capture of Vonitsa and Preveza by the Venetians in November 1717

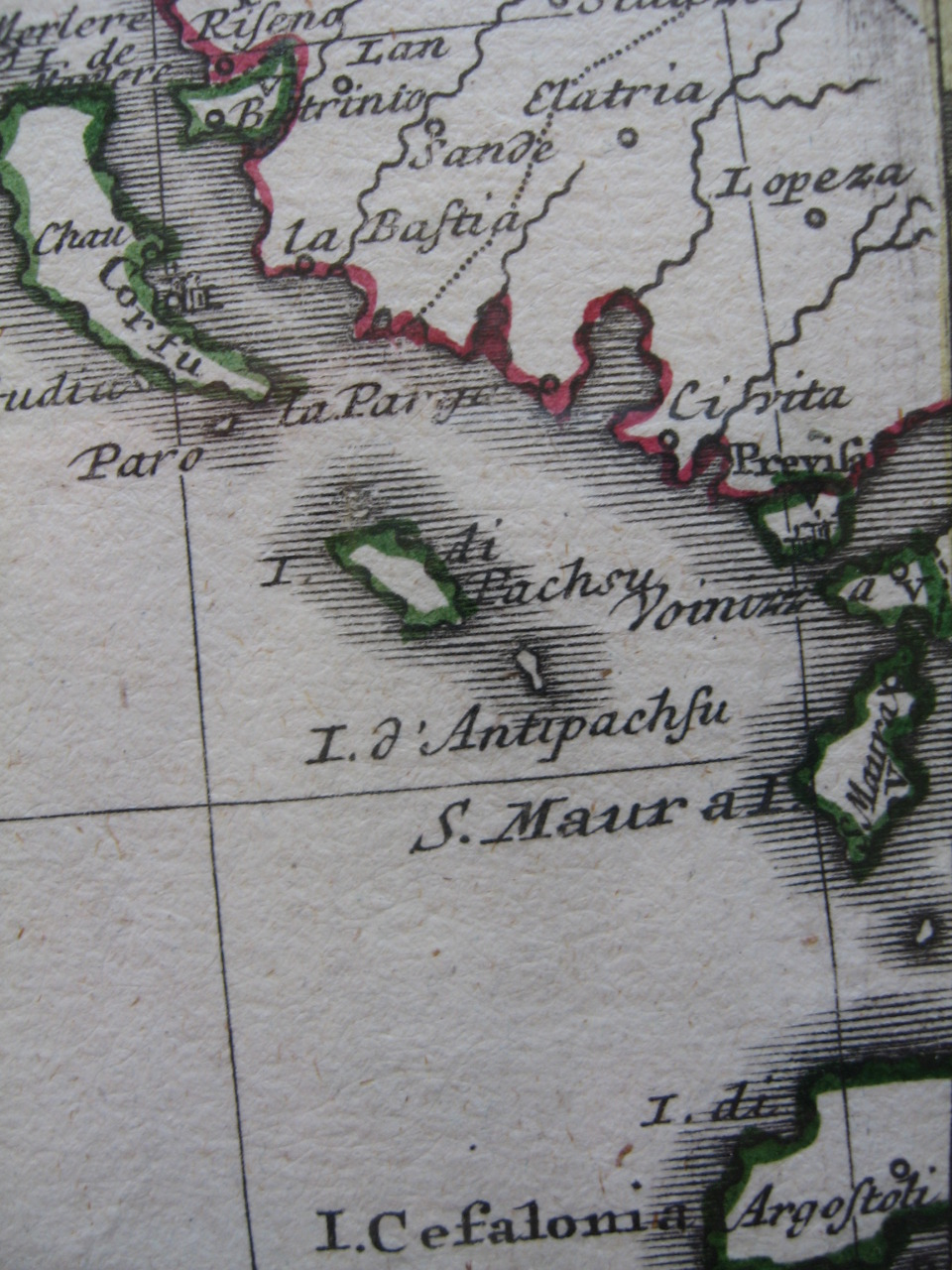
Preveza and other Venetian possessions of the Ionian Sea

Preveza was hotly contested in several Ottoman-Venetian Wars. In September 1684, in the early phase of the Morean War, the Venetians, aided by Greek irregulars, crossed from the island of Lefkada (Santa Maura) and captured Preveza as well as Vonitsa, which gave them control of Acarnania – an important morale booster towards the main campaign in the Morea. However, at the end of the war in 1699 Preveza was handed back to Ottoman rule. Venice captured Preveza again in 1717, during its next war with the Ottomans and was this time able to hold on to the town and fort it – a meager achievement in a war which otherwise went very badly for the Republic. Venetian rule would persist until the very end of the Venetian Republic itself in 1797. During this period, in 1779, the Orthodox missionary Kosmas visited Preveza where it is said he founded a Greek school, which would be the only school of the city during the 18th century. At the end of the 18th century, Preveza became a transit center of trade with western Europe (particularly France), which resulted in the increase of its population to approximately 10,000–12,000.

=== French rule ===
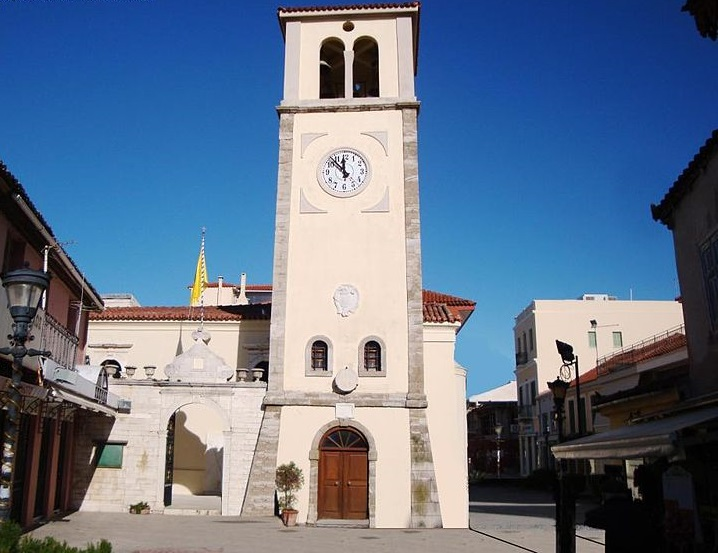
The Venetian clock tower of the city

Following the Treaty of Campo Formio, where Napoleon Bonaparte decreed the final dissolution of the Venetian Republic, Preveza – like other Venetian possessions in Greece and Albania – was ceded to Revolutionary France. 280 French grenadiers arrived in Preveza under the commands of General La Salchette. The people of Preveza welcomed the French troops, and formed a pro-French civic militia. Around this same time the poet Rigas Feraios was combining support for the ideas of the French Revolution with calls for a Greek uprising against Ottoman rule. He was intercepted and killed by the Ottoman authorities when en route to meet Napoleon and directly ask for his help for the Greek cause.

Napoleon Bonaparte, however, focused his attention in another direction, launching the French Campaign in Egypt and Syria, placing France at war with the Ottoman Empire and giving little thought to the fate of the small Preveza garrison exposed on the edge of Ottoman territory. In October 1798, the local Ottoman governor Ali Pasha Tepelena – having great ambitions to make himself a semi-independent ruler – attacked Preveza with an overwhelming force. In the Battle of Nicopolis on 12 October 1798 the troops of Ali Pasha and his son Mukhtar completely overwhelmed the French troops and their local allies. Over the next two days, 13–14 October 1798, a major massacre of the French troops and the local Greek population which defended the city took place in Preveza and Port Salaora, on the Ambracian Gulf, starting before Ali Pasha entered Preveza on 13 October but also continuing in his presence. On 14 October, Ali Pasha called on those citizens of Preveza who had escaped to the Acarnanian Mountains to return to the city, and declared that they would be in no danger. However, upon their return, 170 of them were executed by the sword at the Salaora Port Customs. Many prisoners who survived the massacre died from the hardships on the road to Ioannina. In the grand return and reception held for his victorious troops, which Ali Pasha organized at Ioannina, surviving French and rebel prisoners were given the unpleasant role of walking at the head of the procession, holding the cut and salted heads of their companions, under the shouts and jeers of Ioannina's pro-Ottoman residents. From Ioannina, nine captured French grenadiers, and two officers were sent chained to Istanbul for questioning. One of them, Captain Louis-Auguste Camus de Richemont, was later released, possibly mediated by the mother of Napoleon Bonaparte, Maria Letizia Bonaparte, and eventually became a general. Some popularly circulating tales, of doubtful historical authenticity, link this incident with the origins of the Spoonmaker's Diamond, one of the most closely guarded treasures of Istanbul's Topkapı Palace.

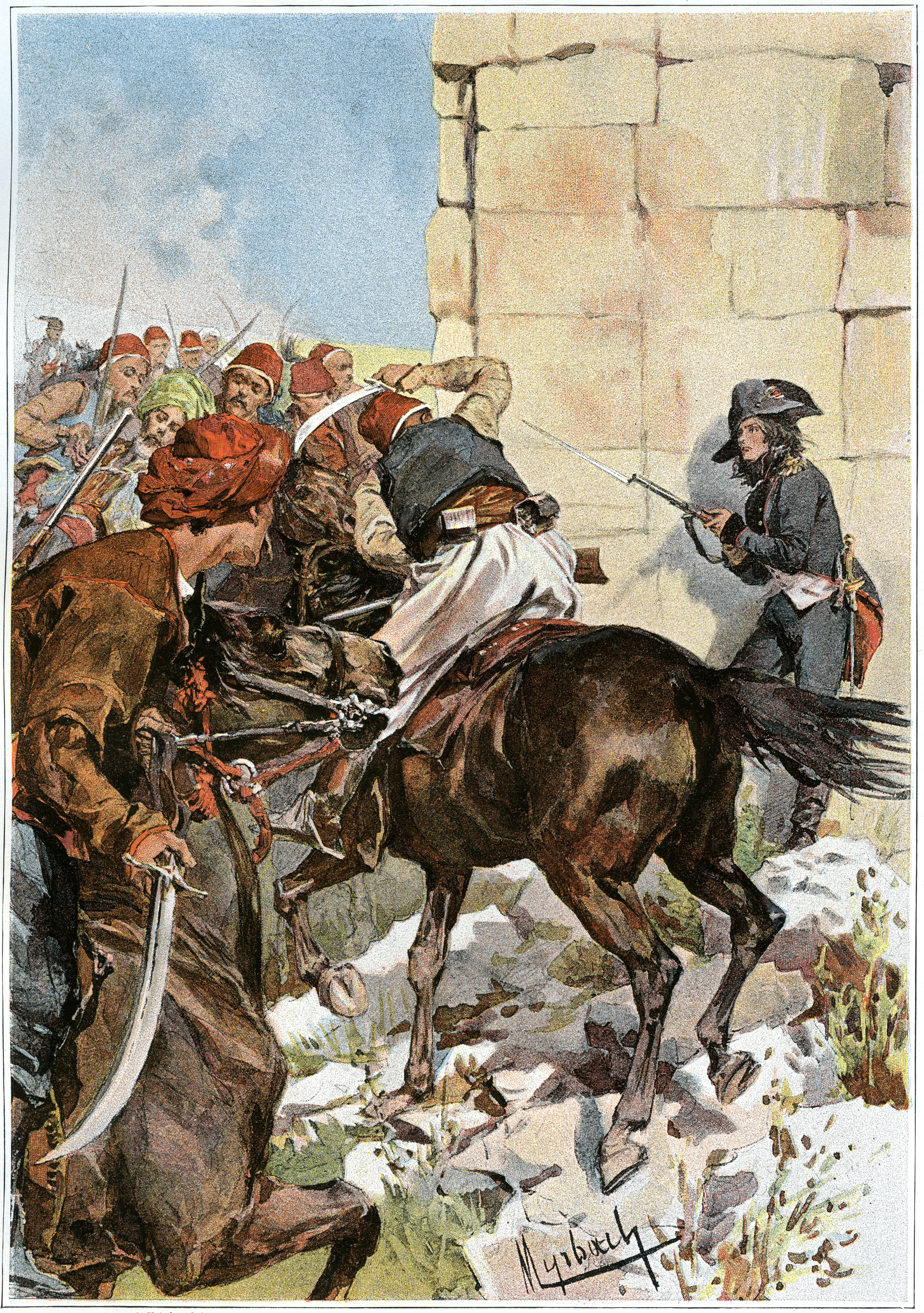
"Lieutenant Richemont shakes down an Albanian horseman, during the battle of Nicopolis, in October 1798" by Felician Myrbach

Though Preveza would remain under Ottoman rule for more than a century, this event – both the short period of Greek militias active in the city and the shock of the massacre that followed – and the influence of the ideas of the French Revolution had a part in the development of Greek nationalism towards the Greek War of Independence, which broke out three decades later.

=== Second Ottoman period ===
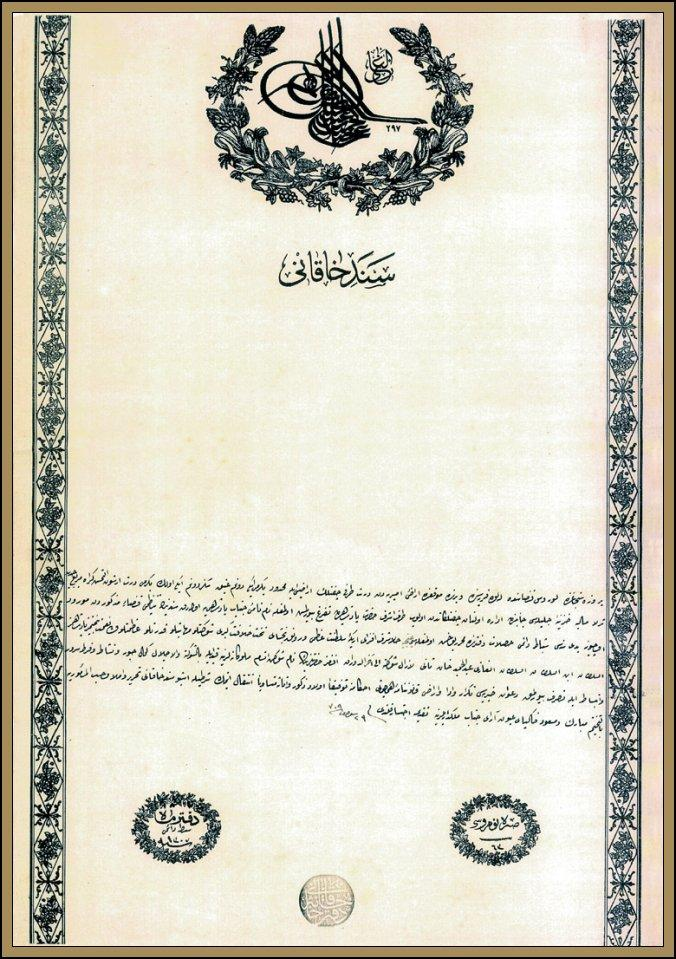
A 1892 decree signed by the Ottoman Sultan Abdul Hamid II which documents possession of a state farm in Preveza passing to the Sultan's ownership

From 1798 to 1820, Preveza was under the rule of the semi-independent Ali Pasha. Following his death in 1822 in Ioannina, Preveza was more directly controlled from Constantinople. Preveza became the seat of a province (the Sanjak of Preveze) in 1863, until the year 1912 when the city joined Greece. In 1835, educational activity in the city revived with the foundation of a new Greek school, the Theophaneios, named after its sponsor, Anastassios Theophanis. In the following decades, this school became a centre of education in the surrounding area and in 1851 it also hosted a female and a secondary school.

According to the Congress of Berlin in 1878, parts of southern Epirus, including Preveza, were to be ceded by the Ottoman Empire to the Kingdom of Greece. Under this context, five meetings were held in Preveza, between Greek and Ottoman representatives, but all of them failed to reach an agreement. Even before negotiations started, the Ottoman side used a number of Albanian national figures for delaying purposes and appointed Abedin bey Dino, member of the League of Prizren and representative of the Albanian national movement, as Ottoman foreign minister. Moreover, Abedin Dino managed to gather various Albanian personalities in Preveza, from all over Albania and Epirus, who believed that the Ottomans will provide full support to the Albanian movement and were against annexation of Epirus to Greece. They also organized a meeting there in January 1879 and on 28 February 1879, signed a petition with a threat to take arms to prevent an annexation of Preveza to Greece. As a result of the unrest created, led by Abdyl Frashëri, another Albanian national figure, the local Ottoman governor was recalled. Abedin Dino was also recalled from Preveza, while the recently arrived Albanians left the city and returned to their homelands.

The discussions between the two sides continued later in Constantinople, but the Ottoman side disagreed with the proposed border by using as an excuse the unrest created by Albanian representatives. In March 1881, the Ottoman side proposed the cession of Thessaly and Arta regions, a proposal that ignored the Albanian positions, and was finally accepted by Greece, although most of Epirus was still outside Greece. On the other hand, the Greek organisation, Epirote Society, founded in 1906 by members of the Epirote diaspora, Panagiotis Danglis and Spyros Spyromilios, aimed at the annexation of the region to Greece by supplying local Greeks with firearms.

From 1881 to 1912 the main sectors of the local economy witnessed dramatic decline and the port of the city lost most of its former commercial significance. However, education was still flourishing with two schools operating: one boys' and one girls' school. The school system of the city was primarily financed by Anastasios Theofanis, notable member of the diaspora.

=== Balkan Wars ===
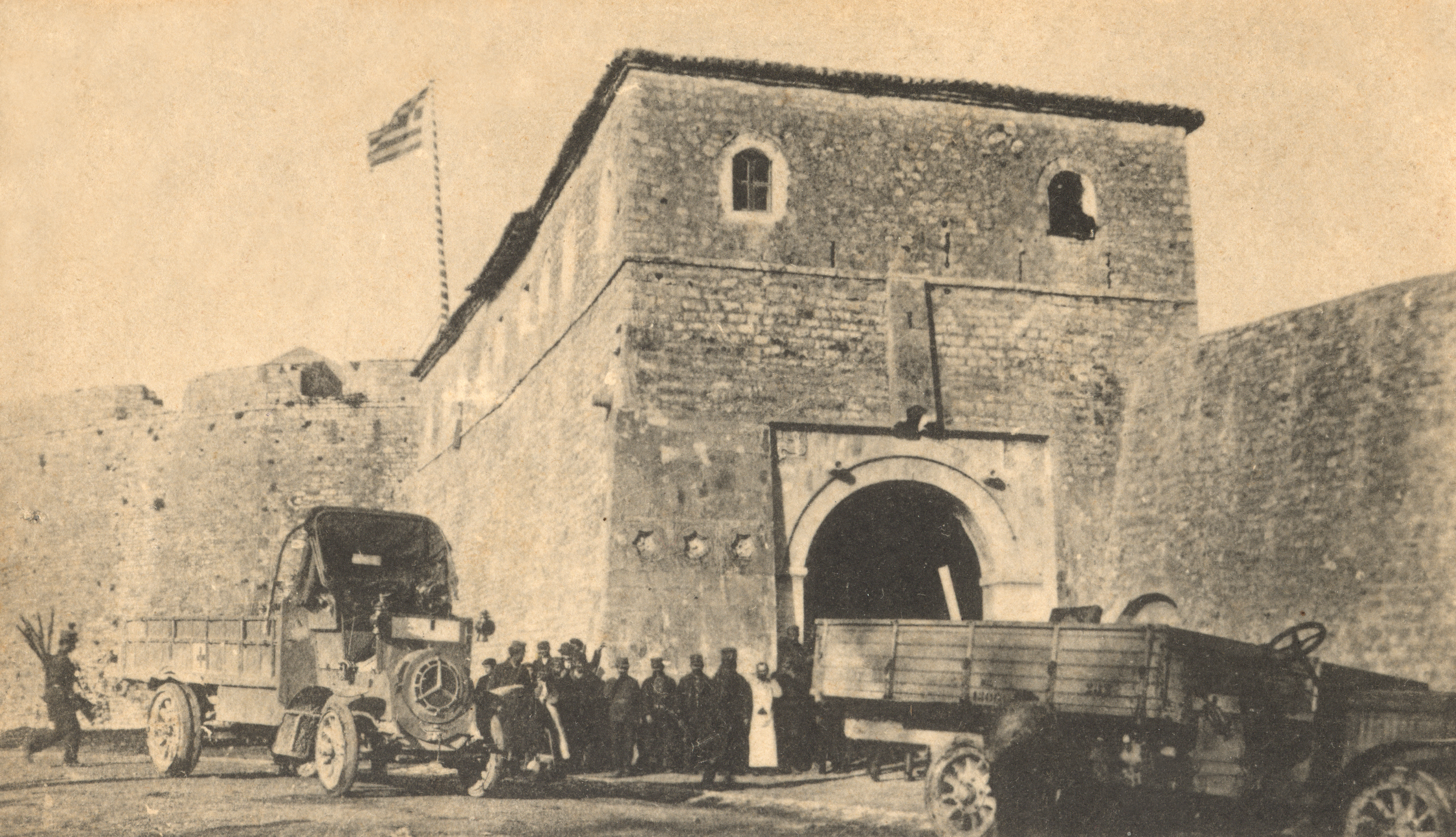
Greek armed forces in Preveza during the First Balkan War at the Castle of Saint Andrew

The city of Preveza remained under Ottoman control until finally taken by the Greek Army on 21 October 1912, during the First Balkan War. The city was liberated after the Battle of Nicopolis, by the Greek forces under Colonel Panagiotis Spiliadis. A garrison of the 8th Infantry Division was stationed in the city by December. Later on in the same war, on 8 February 1913, the inhabitants of Preveza were involved in the first instance in world history of a pilot being shot down in combat. The Russian pilot Nikolay Sakov, flying for the Greeks, had his biplane hit by ground fire following a bomb run on the walls of Fort Bizani near Ioannina. He came down near Preveza, and with the help of local townspeople repaired his plane and resumed his flight back to base. In the following months there arrived in Preveza the famous Swiss photographer Frederic Boissonnas, and a lot of photographs from this period are available today. Preveza along with the rest of southern Epirus formally became part of Greece via the Treaty of London in 1913.

After the Balkan Wars the harbor of Preveza became a significant regional commercial center in western Greece. Moreover, local labor unions were created during the Interwar period.

=== Second World War ===
Along with the rest of Greece, Preveza was occupied by Fascist Italy (1941–1943) and Nazi Germany (1943–1944) during World War II. Before the occupation, the Jewish community had 250 members. They were arrested and exterminated in the Nazi death camps, only 15 survived. After the departure of the Wehrmacht from Preveza, in September 1944, an episode of the Greek Civil War known as the Battle of Preveza took place, lasting for 16 days, between armed partisans of the right-wing EDES and the left-wing EAM-ELAS. The fights stopped after the Caserta Agreement between Great Britain and the two main Greek resistance groups, EDES and ELAS.

=== Modern period ===
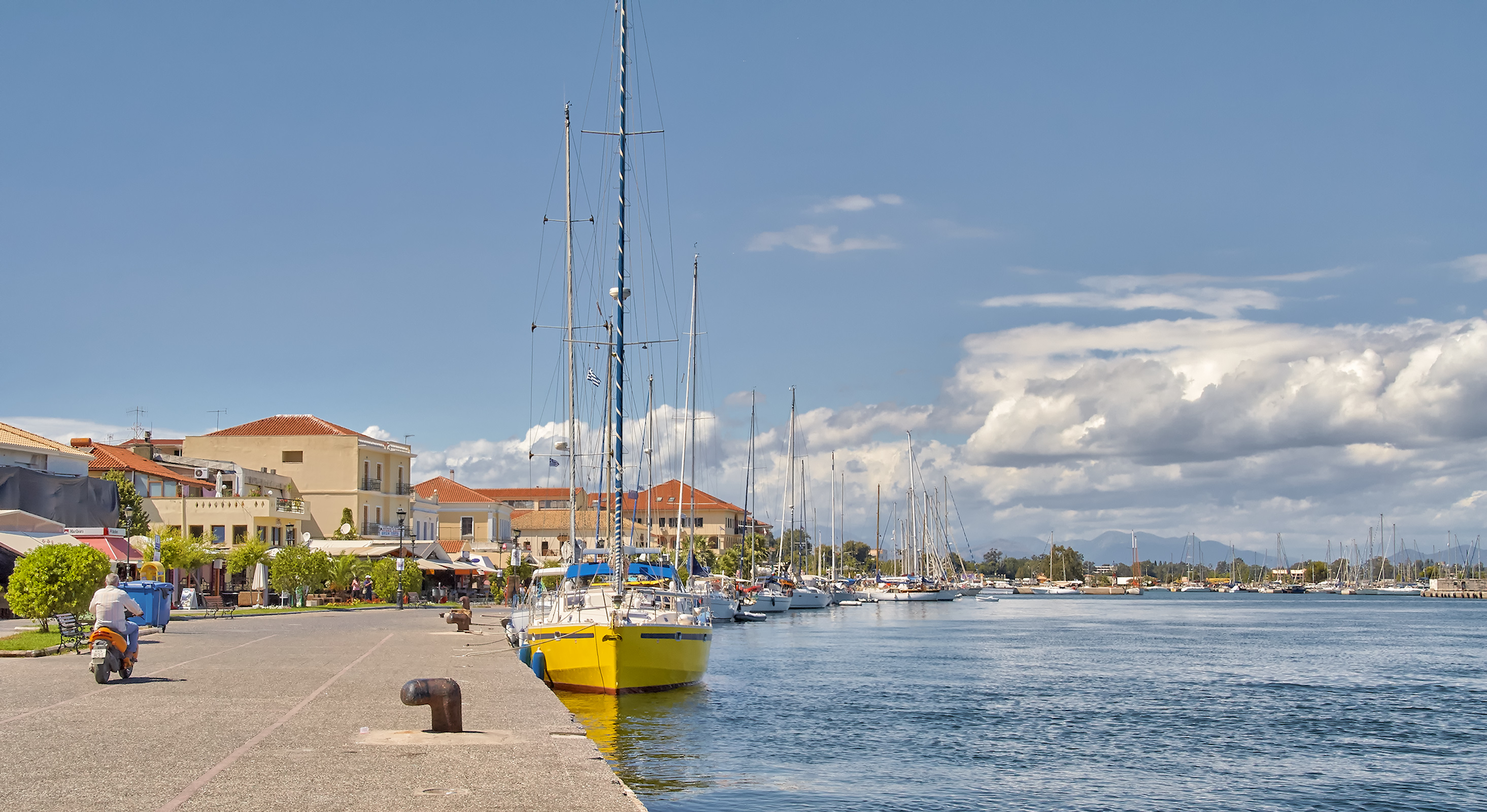
The port

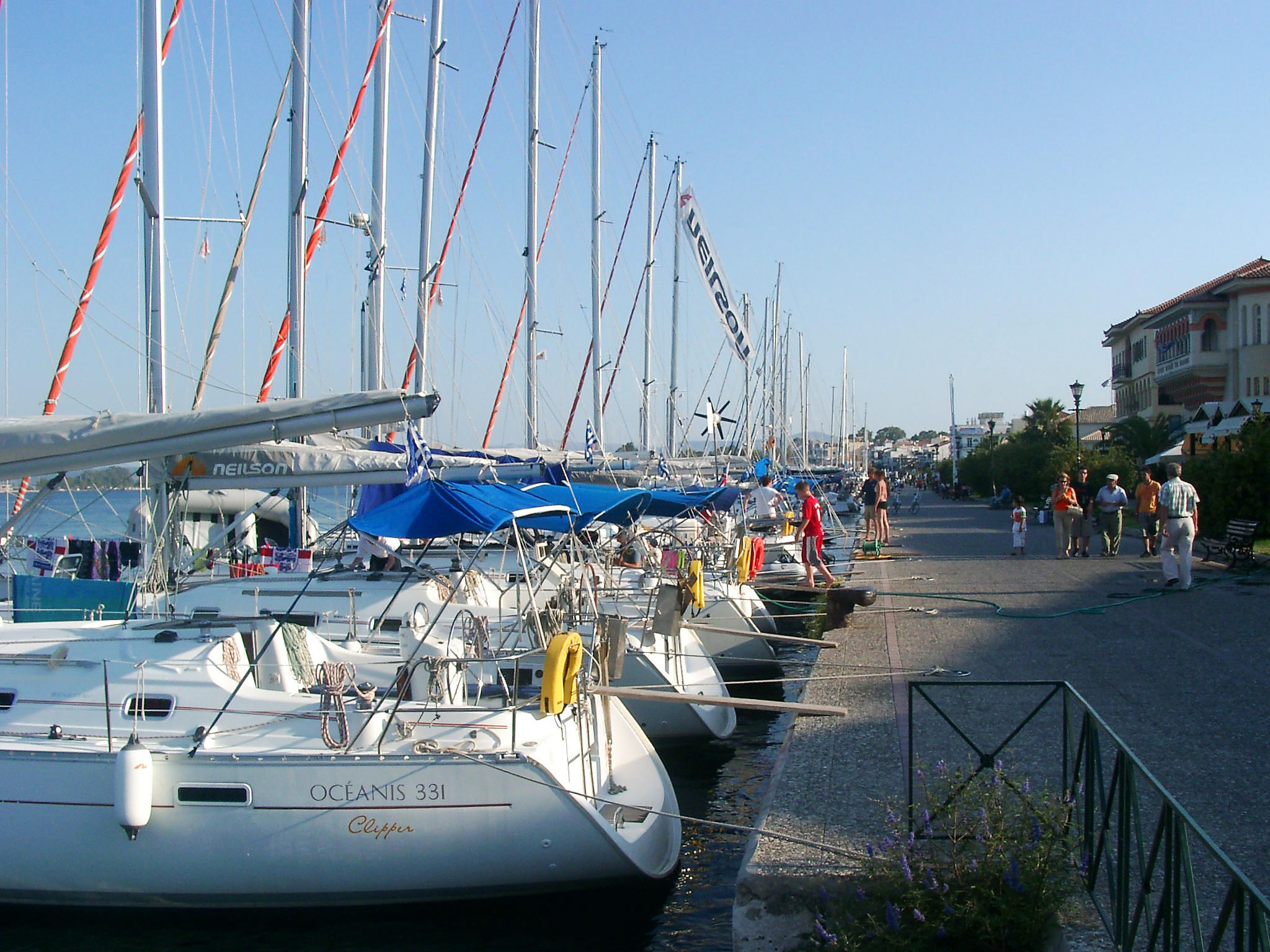
View of the promenade

Today Preveza is a commercial harbor and tourist hub, with a marina, four museums, two cinemas, an open theatre, a music Hall (OASIS), many clubs, taverns, and cafes, benefiting from its proximity to the nearby Aktion National Airport and the nearby island of Lefkada, a major tourist destination. There are in the city the university department of Financial (department of university of Ioannina) and Commercial Navy Academy. The Aktio-Preveza Immersed Tunnel, opened on 2002, is an important work of infrastructure for what has traditionally been a remote and underdeveloped region, and links Preveza to Actium (Greek: Άκτιο, Aktio) on the southern shore of the Ambracian Gulf, greatly shortening the distance of the trip to Lefkada.

In July 2022, Preveza was affected by the large wildfires.

== Main sights ==
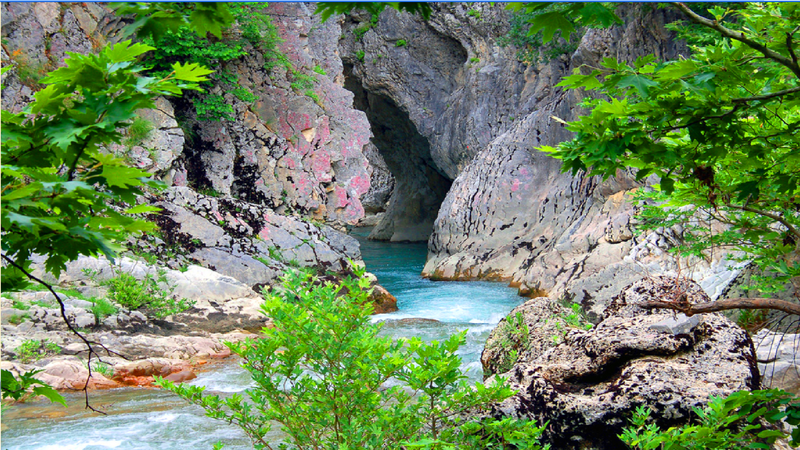
Canoeing in Acheron river

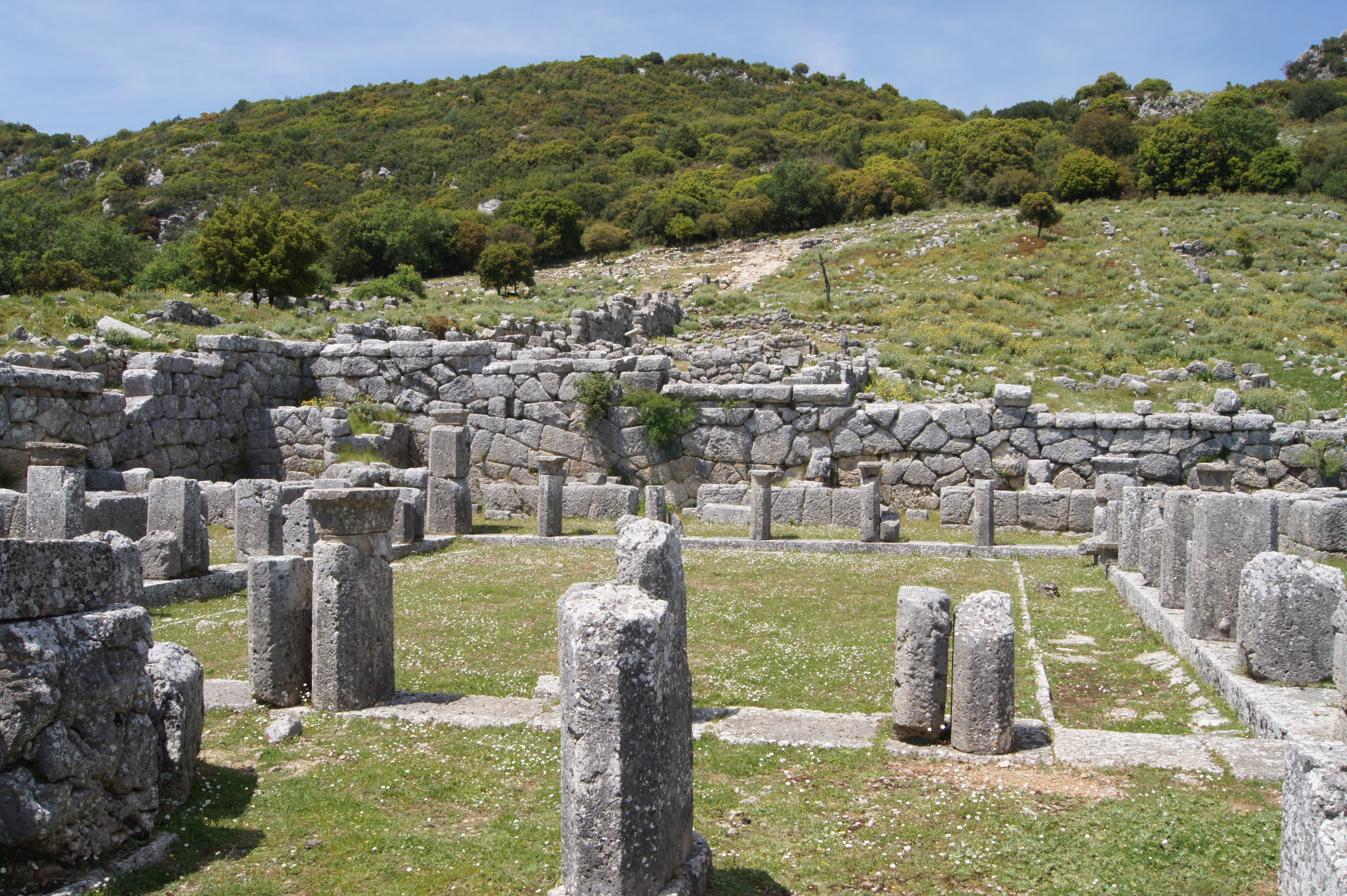
Ancient Cassope

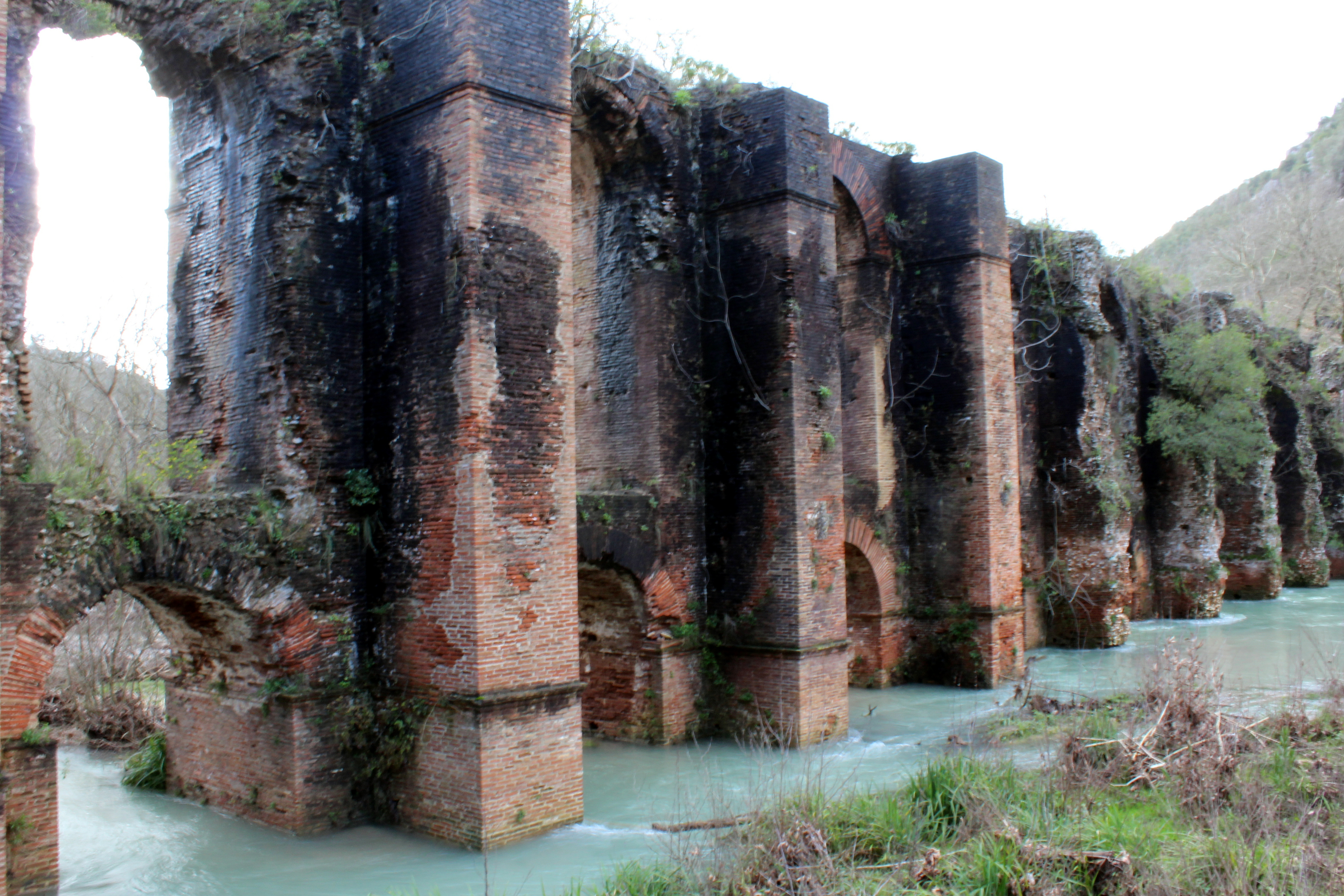
The Roman aqueduct of Nicopolis

- Ancient Nicopolis area (Walls, Basilica of Alkisson, Basilica of Domitius, Roman Odeon, Nympheum, Roman Baths, Cemetery, Theatre, Augustus Monument, Roman Stadium, Roman Villa of Manius Antoninus etc.)
- Ancient Cassope (400 BC), 25 km (16 mi) from Preveza
- Ancient Trikastron citadel (700 – 300BC), 30 km (19 mi) from Preveza
- Ancient Berenikea, Michalitsi village hills (270 BC).
- Archaeological Museum of Nikopolis
- St. Charalampos Church (1715–1793)
- St. Varnavas Church
- St. Abassos Church
- Forest of Lekatsas, in Myrsini village
- Fortress of Laskara, Ali Pasha period (1810)
- Fortress of Pantocrator, Ali Pasha period (1810)
- Castle of Saint Andrew, Ottoman (1701–1717) and Ali Pasha period (1807–1808)
- St. George's Castle, Preveza (1718)
- Fortress of Reniassa (or Fortress of Despo) in Riza (1280)
- St. Elias Church (1780)
- Aktio-Preveza Undersea Tunnel, 2002
- Kostas Karyotakis' statue and last residence
- Madonna Church of Foreigners (Panagia ton Xenon) (1780)
- Monolithi beach and Monolithi forest
- National Bank of Greece building (1931)
- Odysseas Androutsos' marble statue
- Ottoman baths of Ali Pasha Tepelena
- Seytan Pazar, traditional commercial street
- Venetian clock tower of Preveza

== Notable people ==
- Odysseas Androutsos, a hero of the Greek War of Independence
- Rae Dalven (1904–1992), American scholar and translator of poetry of Constantine P. Cavafy and Joseph Eliya into English
- Ahmed Dino, Albanian rebel leader and politician
- Shahin Dino, Albanian leader in the Greco-Turkish War of 1897 for the Turkish side
- Abedin Dino, founding member of the League of Prizren and leading figure of the Albanian National Awakening
- Ali Dino (1890–1938), famous Albanian cartoonist and member of the Hellenic Parliament
- Rasih Dino (1865–1928), diplomat and signatory of Albania to the Treaty of London
- Xhemil Dino, Albanian politician and Nazi collaborator
- Theodoros Grivas (1797–1862), hero of the Greek War of Independence
- Jannis Kallinikos, scholar and intellectual
- Despina Papamichail, tennis player
- Athina Papayianni, athlete
- Thrasyvoulos Tsakalotos (1897–1989), Hellenic Army chief and ambassador
- Athanasia Tsoumeleka, gold medalist in racewalking at the 2004 Summer Olympics in Athens
- Konstantinos Vlachopoulos, hero of the Greek War of Independence

== Transportation ==
Preveza is linked by road to Igoumenitsa and other coastal settlements through the E55 national road, and is also linked with other cities in Epirus such as Ioannina and Arta. The Aktio-Preveza Undersea Tunnel links Preveza by road to Aetolia-Acarnania in Central Greece. Preveza also has a small commercial and passenger port and is served by the nearby Aktion National Airport, which also serves the island of Lefkada.

== Historical population ==
Year	Community	Municipal unit	Municipality
1981	13,624	–	–
1991	13,341	16,886	–
2001	17,724	19,605	–
2011	20,795	22,853	31,733
2021	21,099	22,868	30,841

== International relations ==
=== Twin towns – sister cities ===
Preveza is a founding member of the Douzelage, a unique town twinning association of 24 towns across the European Union. This active town twinning began in 1991 and there are regular events, such as a produce market from each of the other countries and festivals. Discussions regarding membership are also in hand with three further towns (Agros in Cyprus, Škofja Loka in Slovenia and Tryavna in Bulgaria).

Altea, Spain – 1991; Bad Kötzting, Germany – 1991; Bellagio, Italy – 1991; Bundoran, Republic of Ireland – 1991; Granville, France – 1991; Holstebro, Denmark – 1991; Houffalize, Belgium – 1991; Meerssen, the Netherlands – 1991	Niederanven, Luxembourg – 1991; Sesimbra, Portugal – 1991; Sherborne, United Kingdom – 1991; Karkkila, Finland – 1997; Oxelösund, Sweden – 1998; Judenburg, Austria – 1999; Chojna, Poland – 2004; Kőszeg, Hungary – 2004	Sigulda, Latvia – 2004; Sušice, Czech Republic – 2004; Türi, Estonia – 2004; Zvolen, Slovakia – 2007; Rokiškis, Lithuania – 2018; Marsaskala, Malta – 2009; Siret, Romania – 2010

== Gallery ==
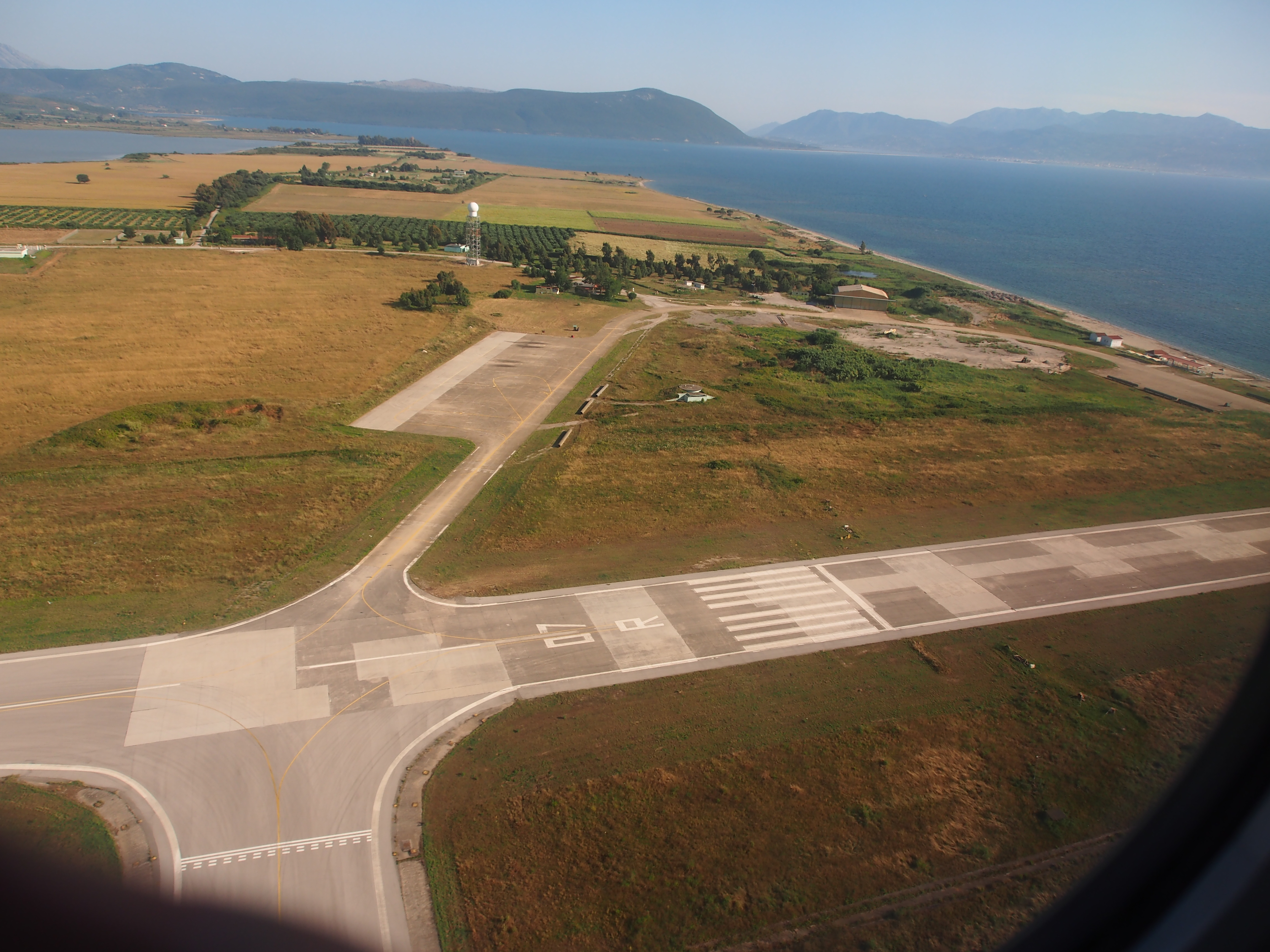
Aktion National Airport

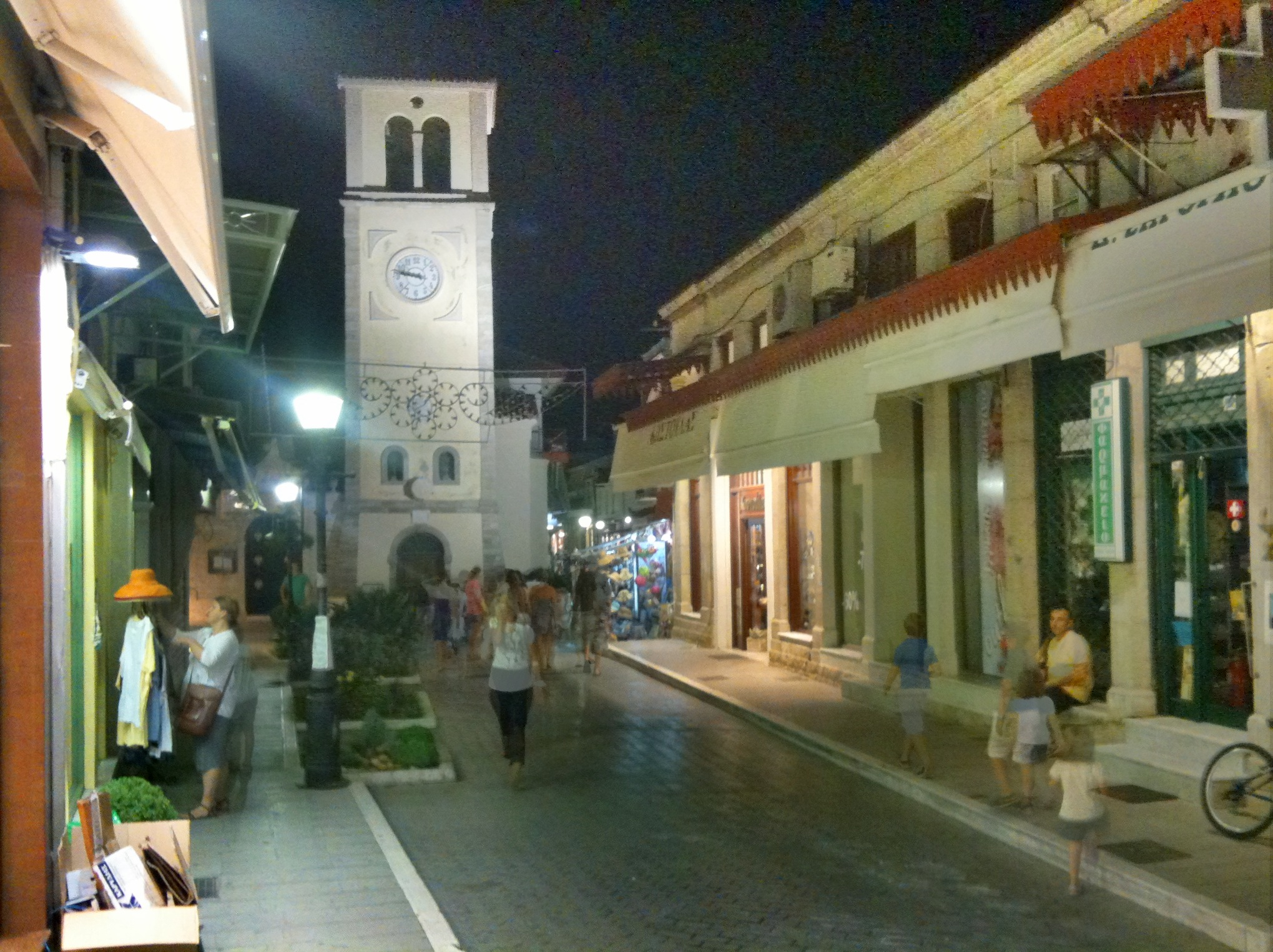
A street to the clocktower

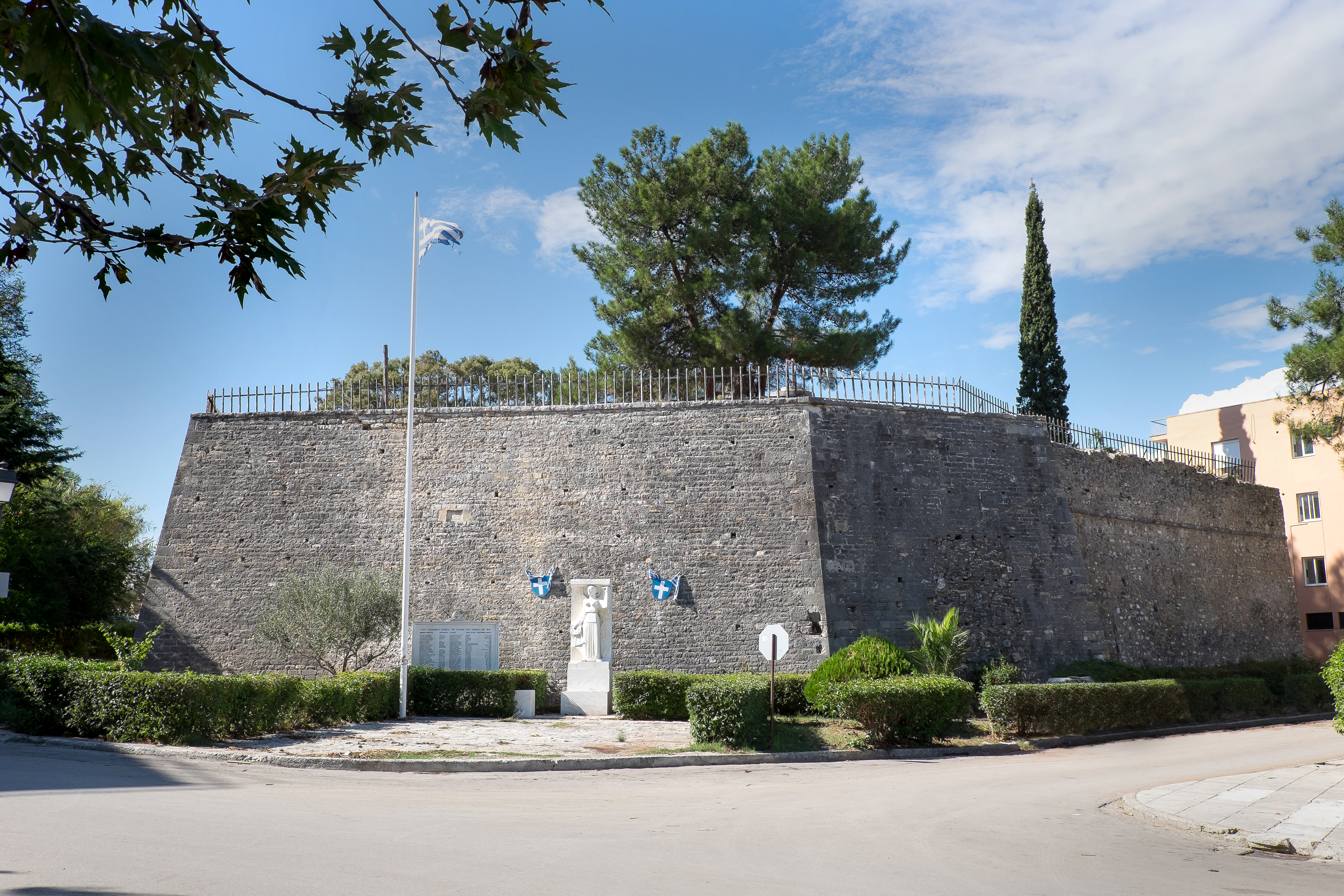
The castle of Saint Andrew

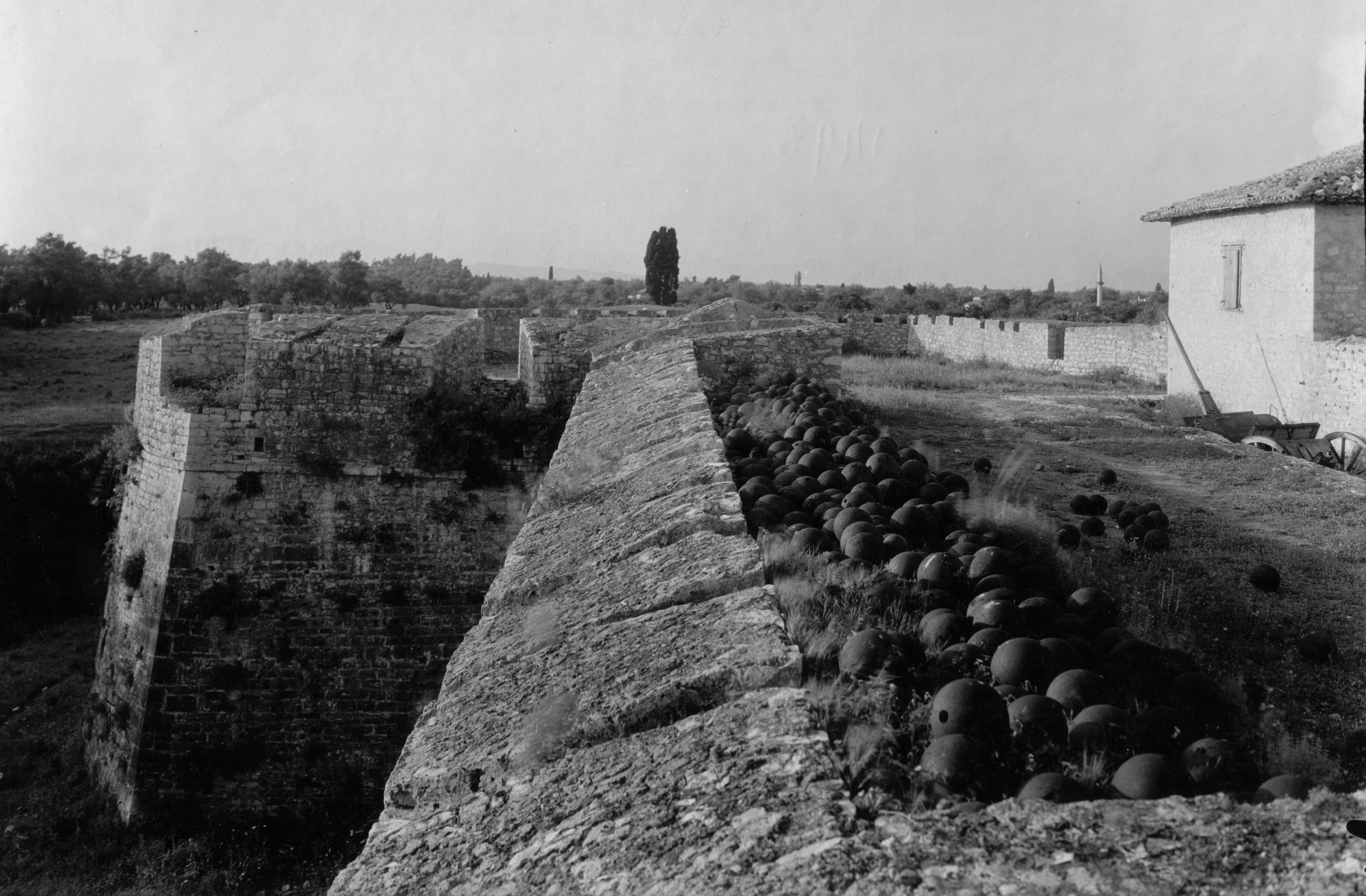
The castle of Saint George, photograph by Frédéric Boissonnas, May 1913

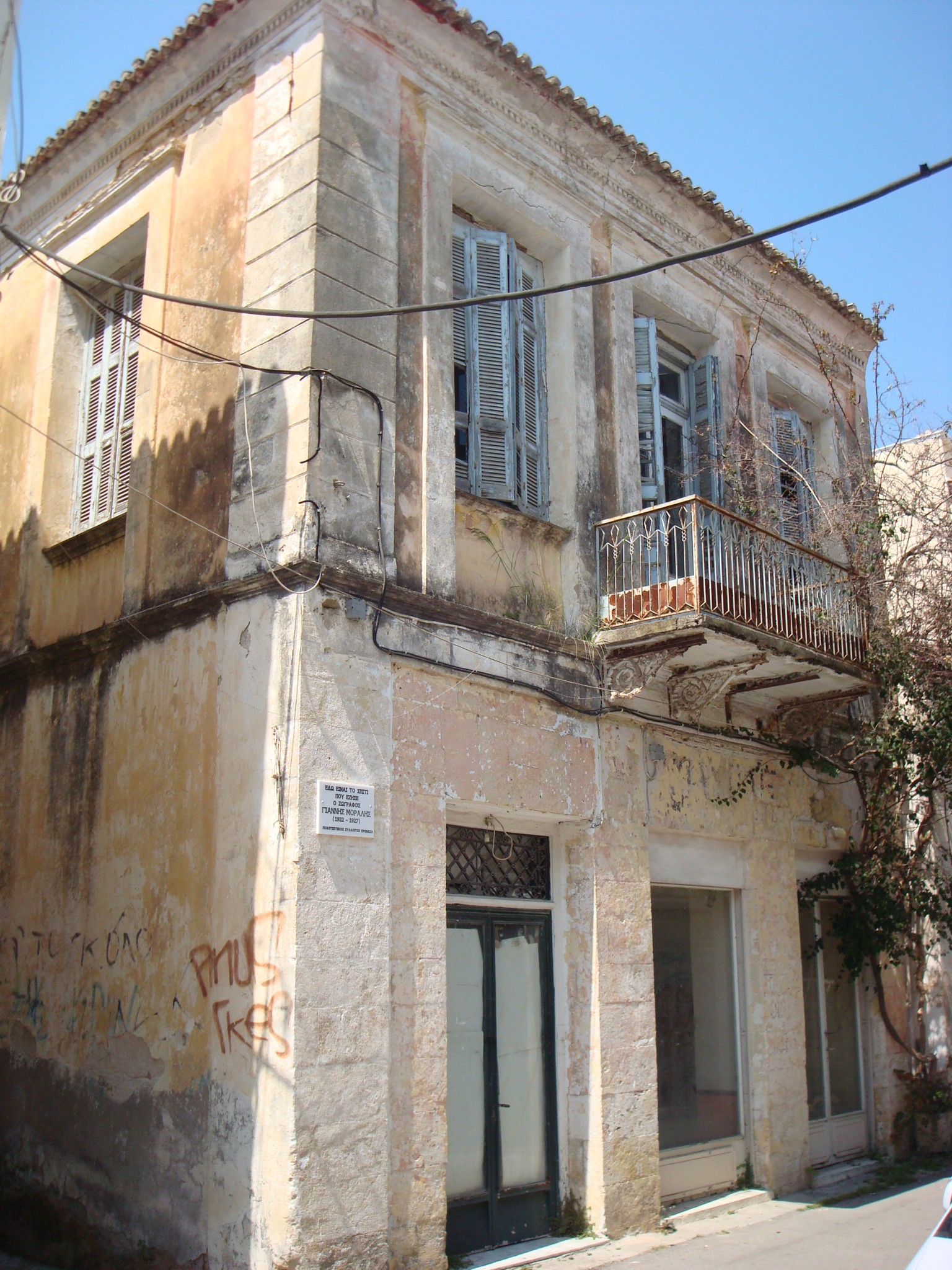
The house of painter Yiannis Moralis

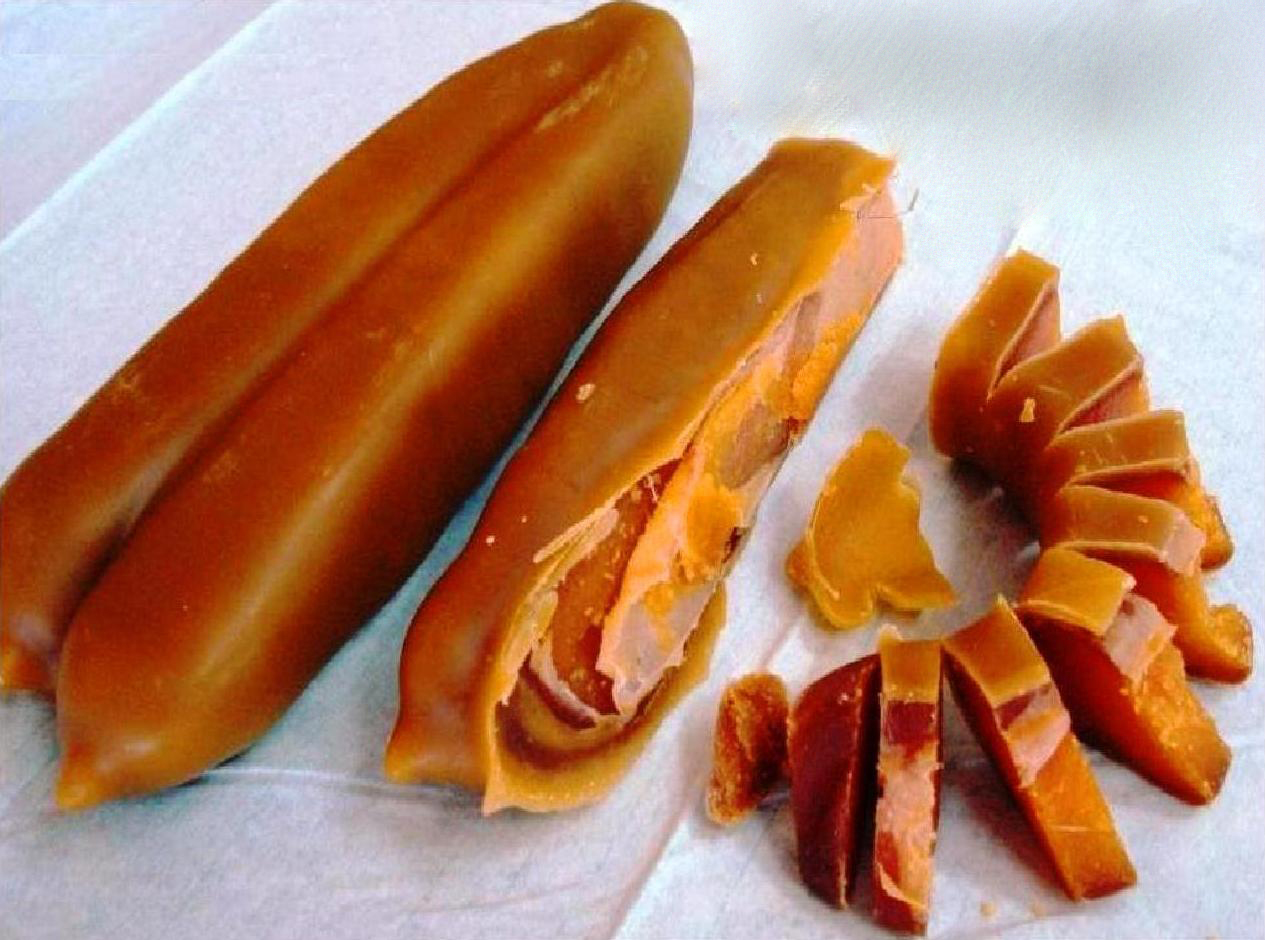
Roe caviar of Preveza (Avgotaracho)

== See also ==
- Actium
- Battle of Actium (31 BC)
- Ancient Nicopolis (31 BC)
- Battle of Preveza (1538 AC)
- Battle of Nicopolis-Preveza (1798 AC)
- Battle of Preveza, Greek Civil War, 1944
- Aktio-Preveza Undersea Tunnel, 2003
- Assembly of Preveza (1879 AC)
- Archaeological Museum of Nikopolis
- List of settlements in the Preveza regional unit

== Sources ==
- Demaratos, Ioannis F. (1932). "sv. Πρέβεζα". Great Greek Encyclopaedia of Pyrsos (in Greek). 20. Athens: 654–659.
- Donos, Dimosthenis (2013). "From Aravantinos to Vasilas: Reflections on the historiography of Preveza". Prevezanika Chronika (in Greek). 49–50. Preveza: 383–429.
- Karabelas, Nikos D. (2010). "The Ottoman conquest of Preveza and its first castle". Türk Tarih Kongresi, 20–24 Eylül 2010, Ankara. Kongreye Sunulan Bildiriler, 4. Cilt, 2. Kisim, Osmanli Tarihi. 4. Ankara: 967–998.
- Karabelas, Nikos D. (2014). "Είναι η Πρέβεζα συνέχεια της αρχαίας Νικόπολης;" (in Greek) – via Academia.edu.
- Karabelas, Nikos D. (2015). "The conquest of "Preveza" by Mehmet II". Πρακτικά α΄ Πανηπειρωτικού Συνεδρίου. "Ιστορία-Λογιοσύνη: Η Ήπειρος και τα Ιωάννινα από το 1430 έως το 1913" (in Greek). 1. Ioannina: 103–130.
- Karabelas, Nikos D. (2020). "The foundation of Preveza and the dating of two versions of The Chronicle of Morea". Epeteris Hetaireias Byzantinon Spoudon (EEBS) (Annuaire de l' association d' études byzantines). 56. Athens: 93–120.
- Kondis, Basil (1976). Greece and Albania: 1908–1914 (Thesis). Thessaloniki: Institute for Balkan Studies, New York University. doi:10.12681/eadd/4724. hdl:10442/hedi/4724.
- Phourikis, Petros A. (1929). "Νικόπολις–Πρέβεζα, Β′ Πρέβεζα" [Nicopolis–Preveza, II. Preveza]. Ηπειρωτικά Χρονικά (in Greek). 4. Ioannina: 263–294. ISSN 1108-4758.
- Phourikis, Petros A. (1930). "Νικόπολις–Πρέβεζα, Γ′ Χριστιανικά μνημεία Πρεβέζης" [Nicopolis–Preveza, III. Christian monuments of Preveza]. Ηπειρωτικά Χρονικά (in Greek). 5. Ioannina: 211–228. ISSN 1108-4758.
- Savvides, Alexis G. K. (1995). "Preveze". In Bosworth, C. E.; van Donzel, E.; Heinrichs, W. P. & Lecomte, G. (eds.). The Encyclopaedia of Islam, Second Edition. Volume VIII: Ned–Sam. Leiden: E. J. Brill. pp. 334–335. ISBN 978-90-04-09834-3.
- Savvides, Alexis G. K. (1992). Μελετήματα βυζαντινής προσωπογραφίας και τοπικής ιστορίας: ανατύπωση άρθρων 1981–1991 (in Greek). Hērodotos. ISBN 978-960-7290-37-3.
- Savvides, Alexis G. K. (1993). "The Turkish conquest of Preveza through the Short Chronicles". Proceedings of the 1st International Symposium on the History of Preveza (in Greek). Preveza: 25–39.
- Skoulidas, Ilias (2001). "The Relations Between the Greeks and the Albanians during the 19th Century: Political Aspirations and Visions (1875–1897)". Didaktorika.gr (in Greek). University of Ioannina. doi:10.12681/eadd/12856. hdl:10442/hedi/12856.
- Soustal, Peter; Koder, Johannes (1981). Tabula Imperii Byzantini, Band 3: Nikopolis und Kephallēnia (in German). Vienna: Verlag der Österreichischen Akademie der Wissenschaften. ISBN 978-3-7001-0399-8.
- Vasilas, Elias (28 June – 5 July 1954). "Preveza and the origin of the word". Βήμα Πρεβέζης (in Greek) (594–595). Preveza: 1 & 2.
- Vasmer, Max (1941). Die Slaven in Griechenland (in German). Berlin.
