= Aktio–Preveza Undersea Tunnel =

Road tunnel in Greece

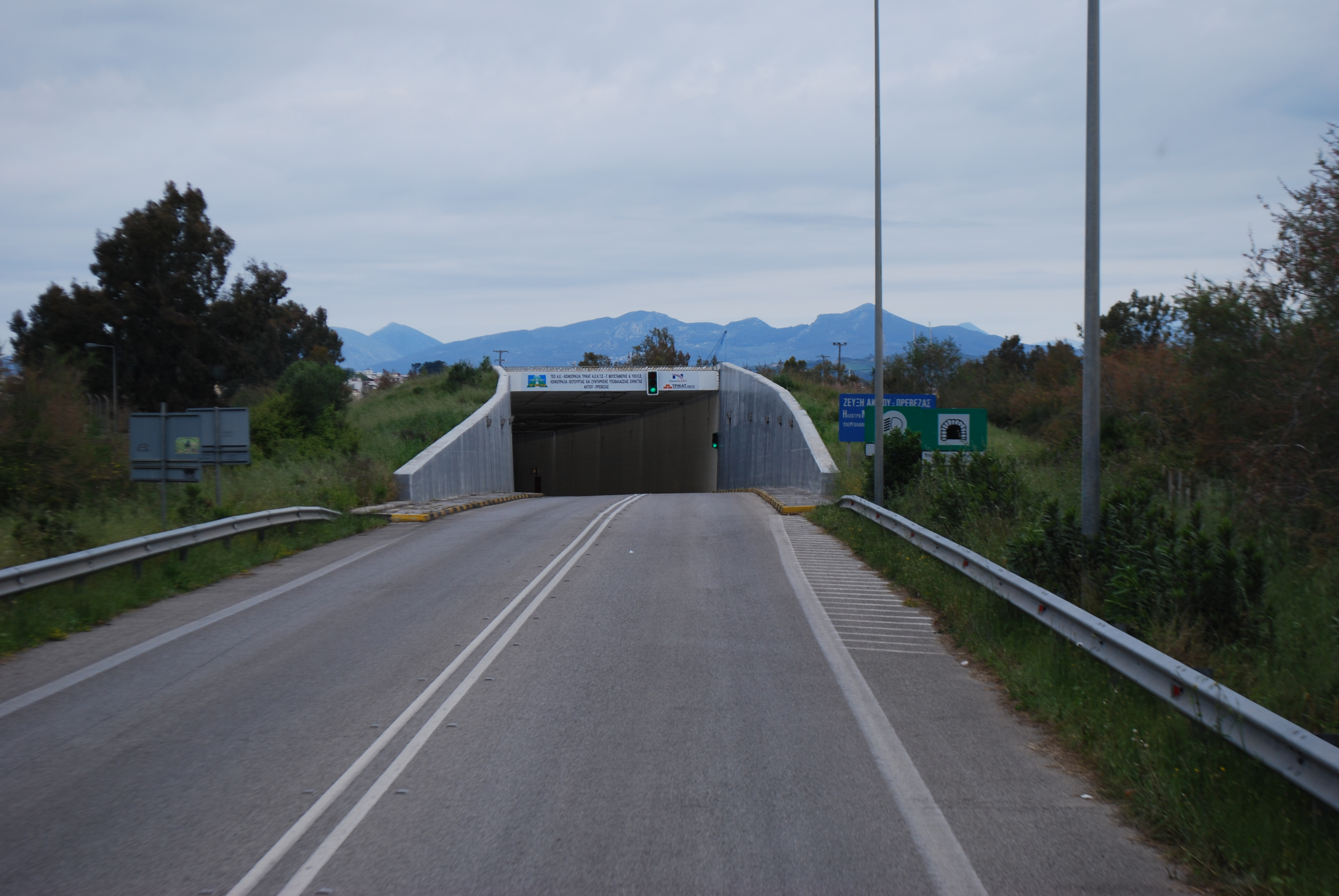
- Interactive map of Aktio–Preveza Undersea Tunnel

Overview
- Location: Ambracian Gulf
- Coordinates: Preveza: 38°56′57.54″N 20°44′46.87″E; Aktio: 38°56′38.42″N 20°45′50.18″E
- Status: Active
- Start: Epirus, Greece
- End: Preveza, Greece

Operation
- Opened: 2002
- Owner: Greek Government
- Operator: Egnatia Odos S.A
- Character: Drive through

Technical
- Line length: 1,570 m (5,150 ft)

The Aktio–Preveza Undersea Tunnel (Greek: Υποθαλάσσια σήραγγα Πρέβεζας–Ακτίου) is an undersea road tunnel across the mouth of the Ambracian Gulf in western Greece. It links Epirus and the city of Preveza on the north shore of the gulf with the cape of Aktio (Actium) in Aetolia-Acarnania, in Central Greece. Completed in 2002, the tunnel is an important piece of infrastructure in an underdeveloped region, and greatly shortens the travel distance between the two sides of the gulf, which had been only possible by ferry. It is the only undersea tunnel in Greece.

== Technical characteristics ==
The tunnel is 1,570 metres long and consists of:

- An underwater section of 909 metres
- A cut and cover section of 509 metres on the north (Preveza) side
- A cut and cover section of 152 metres on the south (Aktio) side

The tunnel has a cross-section height of 8.6 metres and width 12.6 metres. The clearance width is 10.6 metres and clearance height is 5.4 metres. The tunnel has a single two-way carriageway and includes a 4.0 metre-wide side lane and a 1.3 metre wide pedestrian sidewalk in each direction.

== Construction ==
Construction of the tunnel was a joint venture between Christiani & Nielsen and the Athens-based Technical Company of General Construction (TCGC). The architects of the tunnel were the Copenhagen-based Comar Engineers A/S, and Doxiadis & Zannis of Athens. The contracts was awarded in 1995, and construction was turned over to the Greek Ministry of the Environment, Physical Planning and Public Works in 1999. The tunnel was completed in 2002.

== Special techniques used ==
The tunnel is built in an area of severe seismic activity featuring complex geo-technical conditions. As a result, the tunnel contains a number of advanced features, such as stone columns underneath the tunnel to help it withstand soil liquefaction during an earthquake.

== Costs and toll ==
The total construction cost was approximately €90 million. As of January 2026 the toll is 3 euros.
