= Ambracian Gulf =

- Αμβρακικός κόλπος (Greek)
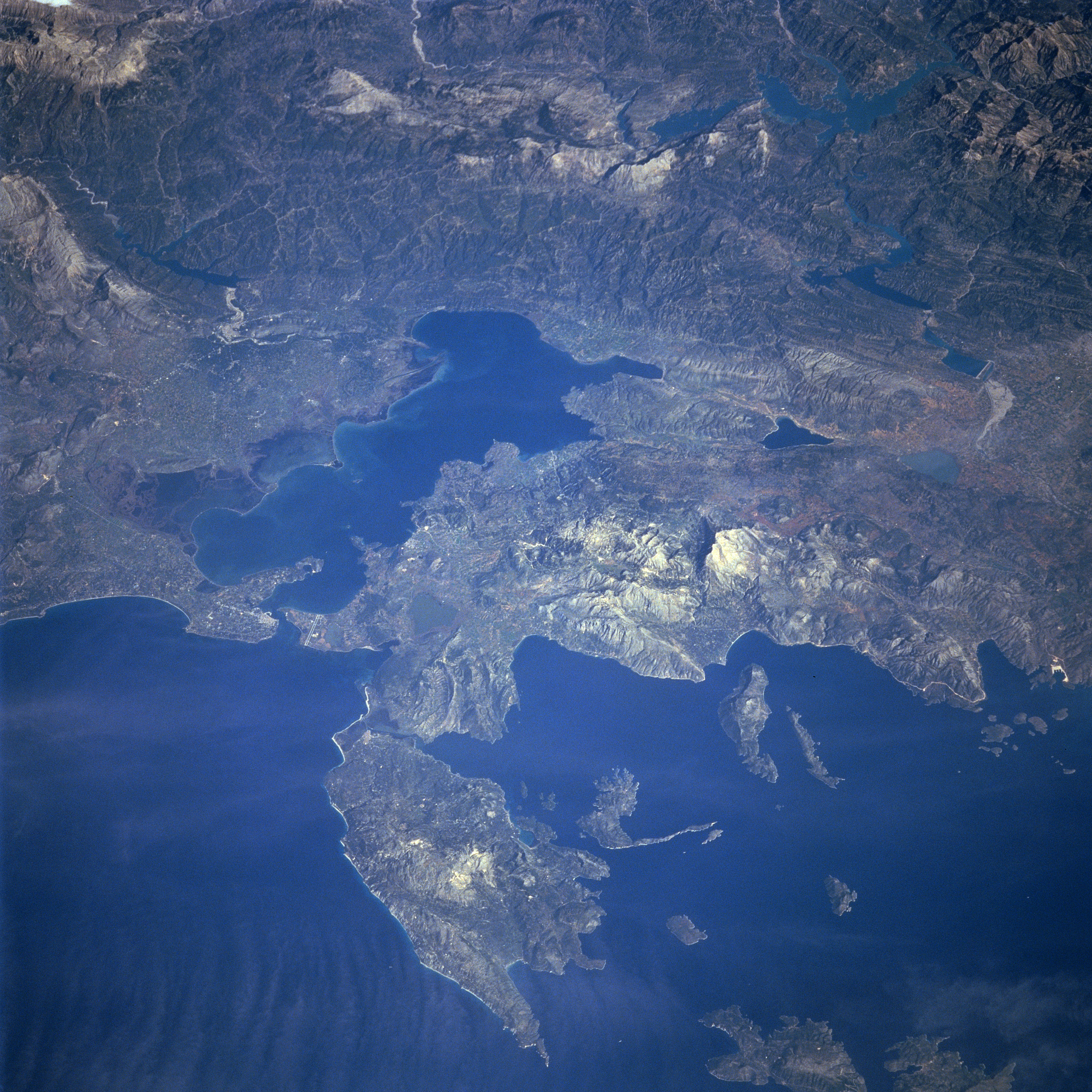

- Location within Greece Epirus Location within Greece
- Coordinates: 38°58′21″N 20°58′09″E
- Type: gulf
- Part of: Ionian Sea (Mediterranean)
- Primary inflows: Arachthos
- Basin countries: Greece
- Surface area: 654 km^{2} (253 sq mi)
- Average depth: 22 m (72 ft)
- Max. depth: 60 m (200 ft)
- Shore length^{1}: 40 km (25 mi)

Ramsar Wetland
- Official name: Amvrakikos gulf
- Designated: 21 August 1975
- Reference no.: 61
- ^{1} Shore length is not a well-defined measure.

The Ambracian Gulf, also known as the Gulf of Arta or the Gulf of Actium, and in some official documents as the Amvrakikos Gulf (Greek: Αμβρακικός κόλπος, romanized: Amvrakikos kolpos), is a gulf of the Ionian Sea in northwestern Greece. About 40 km (25 mi) long and 15 km (9 mi) wide, it is one of the largest enclosed gulfs in Greece, and due to its ecological importance is one of the National Parks of Greece. The towns of Preveza, Amphilochia (formerly Karvassaras), and Vonitsa lie on its shores.

== Name ==
The gulf takes its name from the ancient city of Ambracia located near its shores. Its alternative name comes from the medieval (and modern) city of Arta, located in the same place as ancient Ambracia.

== Geography ==
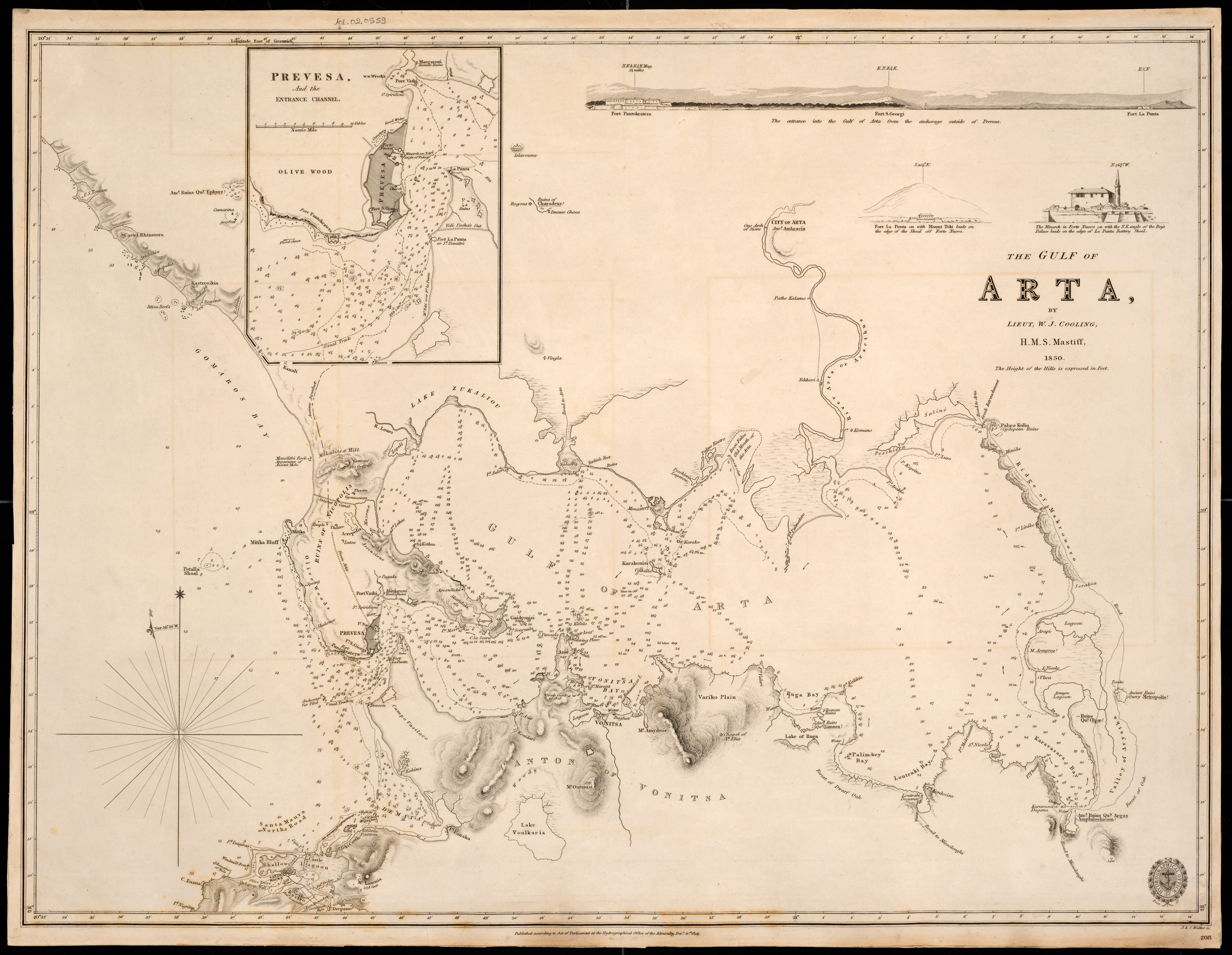
Detailed map of the Ambracian Gulf, drawn by W. J. Cooling of the British Admiralty in 1830

The entrance to the gulf is through a 700 m (2,297 ft)-wide channel between Aktio (ancient Actium) on the south and Preveza on the north; a recent road tunnel connects the two. The gulf is quite shallow, and its northern shore is broken by numerous marshes, large parts of which form an estuary system. The Louros and Arachthos (or Arta) rivers drain into it; for this reason it is warmer and less salty than the Ionian, and a current flows from the gulf into the sea. It is rich in grey mullet, sole, and eel, and is also very famous for the local variety of large shrimp (gabari, in Greek γάμπαρη). It is home to Melibe viridis, a species of sea slug, a nudibranch, a marine gastropod mollusk in the family Tethydidae. Sea turtles and dolphins regularly make an appearance, while it contains lagoons very important for birds, attracting among others pelicans and flamingoes.

== History ==
The Ambracian Gulf was the site of the Battle of Actium, in which Augustus' forces defeated those of Mark Antony and Cleopatra. Battle of Preveza, which Ottoman admiral Hayreddin Barbarossa defeated the Holy League's admiral Andrea Doria, held on the very same gulf in 1538 . From Greek independence (Treaty of Constantinople, 1832) until the Second Balkan War (Treaty of Bucharest, 1913), the gulf formed part of the border between the Kingdom of Greece and the Ottoman Empire.

The remains of numerous ancient cities lie on its shores: Nicopolis, Argos Ippatum, Limnaea, Preveza and Olpae.

== Ecology ==
The Ambracian gulf is one site in the EU 'life transfer' project restoring seagrass meadows to combat climate change and enrich biodiversity

== Transportation ==
Since 2002, the northern and southern sides at the mouth of the gulf are connected by the Aktio-Preveza Undersea Tunnel. The tunnel greatly shortens the travel distance across the gulf, which used to be possible only by ferry. The Aktion International Airport (airport code PVK) is built near the Gulf's entrance and serves the region.
