= Louros (river) =

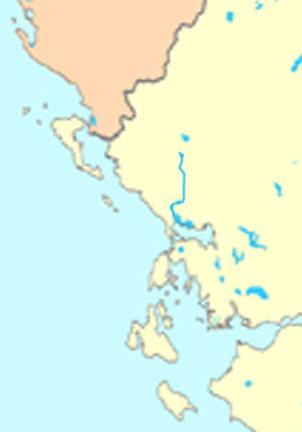
- Course of the Louros

Location
- Country: Greece

Physical characteristics
- Source
  - location: Vouliasta, Ioannina regional unit, Epirus
  - coordinates: 39°25′55″N 20°50′28″E
- Mouth
  - location: Ambracian Gulf
  - coordinates: 39°02′50″N 20°46′42″E
- Length: 80 km (50 mi)
- Basin size: 963 km^{2} (372 sq mi)

The Louros (Greek: Λούρος) is a river in the Epirus region, in northwestern Greece. It is 80 km (50 mi) long, and its drainage area is 963 km^{2} (372 sq mi). It emerges from the ground in a large spring located immediately north of the village of Vouliasta, in the Ioannina regional unit. It flows south through a canyon, and then a dam followed by a hydroelectric power station. The Louros flows past the town of Filippiada, forming the boundary between Arta regional unit and the Preveza regional unit. The river then veers east into the Preveza regional unit, flowing through the municipality of Louros, named after the river. The Louros then empties into the marshes at the northern end of the Ambracian Gulf.

With Strymon River, Louros is one of only two rivers in the world where the critically endangered Greek lamprey (Caspiomyzon hellenicus) has been found.
