= List of settlements in the Preveza regional unit =

This is a list of settlements in the Preveza regional unit, Greece.

- Acherousia
- Agia
- Agios Georgios
- Ammoudia
- Andonia
- Ano Rachi
- Ano Skafidoti
- Anogeio
- Anthousa
- Assos
- Cheimadio
- Despotiko
- Dryofyto
- Ekklisies
- Filippiada
- Flampoura
- Galatas
- Gorgomylos
- Gymnotopos
- Kamarina
- Kanali
- Kanallaki
- Kastri
- Kerasona
- Kleisoura
- Koroni
- Koryfoula
- Kotsanopoulo
- Koukkouli
- Kranea
- Kryopigi
- Kypseli
- Livadari
- Louros
- Loutsa
- Meliana
- Mesopotamo
- Michalitsi
- Mouzakaiika
- Myrsini
- Mytikas
- Narkissos
- Nea Kerasounta
- Nea Sampsounta
- Nea Sinopi
- Neo Sfinoto
- Nikolitsi
- Nikopoli
- Oropos
- Panagia
- Pappadates
- Parga
- Petra
- Polystafylo
- Preveza
- Revmatia
- Riza
- Rizovouni
- Romia
- Skepasto
- Skiadas
- Stavrochori
- Stefani
- Themelo
- Thesprotiko
- Trikastro
- Tsagkaropoulo
- Valanidorachi
- Valanidoussa
- Vouvopotamos
- Vrachos
- Vrysoula

== See also ==
- List of towns and villages of Greece
