= Pente Pigadia =

Settlement in the Preveza regional unit, Greece

Coordinates: 39°23′N 20°55′E

Pente Pigadia (Greek: Πέντε Πηγάδια, or "Five Wells"; before 1971: Μπρίγκα - Brigka) is a settlement in the municipal unit of Filippiada in municipality of Ziros, Preveza regional unit in Greece. It is part of the community of Kleisoura. Pente Pigadia is situated in the western foothills of the Xirovouni mountains, about 25 km north of Arta. Pente Pigadia was under Ottoman rule until the First Balkan War (1912–1913). On 21 October, 1912 (O.S.), the Battle of Pente Pigadia took place here.

== Population ==
Year	Population
1991	74
2001	54

== See also ==
- List of settlements in the Preveza regional unit
