= Giannis and Thymios Retzos =

Executed Greek criminals and serial killers

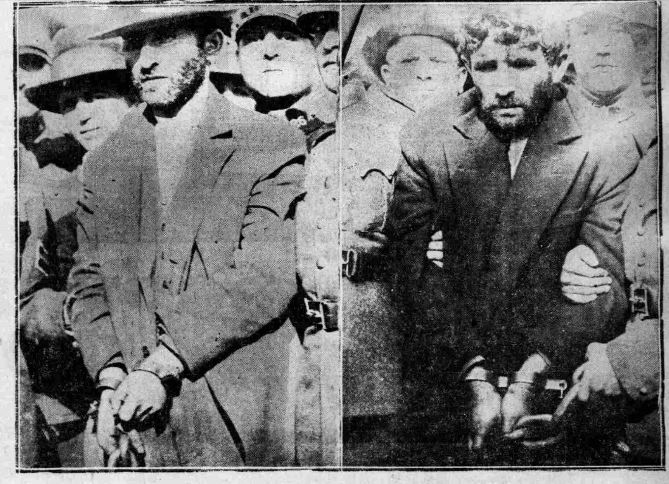
- The brothers in 1929
- Born: 1896 (Giannis); 1899 (Thymios); Anogeio, Greece (both)
- Died: 5 March 1930 (both); Corfu, Greece (both)
- Cause of death: Execution by firing squad
- Other names: Athanasios Nikolas Tsiokos (Giannis); Nikolas Petre Dissos (Thymios)
- Conviction: Murder x8
- Penalty: Death

Details
- Victims: 8–26+
- Span of crimes: 1917–1928
- Country: Greece
- State: Epirus
- Date apprehended: 1928

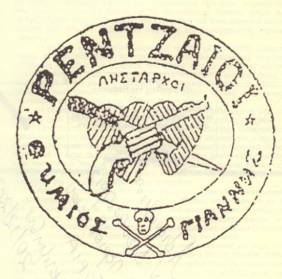
The brothers' seal

Giannis (1896 – 5 March 1930) and Thymios Retzos (1899 – 5 March 1930) were a duo of Greek brothers, notorious criminals and serial killers active during the interwar period in Epirus. By the time they were arrested and executed in 1930, they had committed dozens of murders, robberies, kidnappings and thefts.

== Early crimes ==
Both brothers originated from the small village of Anogeio, in Preveza.

Giannis Retzos was born in 1896, while the younger brother, Thymios, was born in 1899. In 1917, while serving in the military in Ersekë, Giannis learned the identities of the men who had killed his father (he had disappeared in 1909, and it was revealed to be homicide after his skeleton was found in a hole). Wanting to avenge his death, he got in contact with Thymios, and both of them later hunted down and killed both men.

After this, the Retzos, accompanied by several other accomplices, went into hiding in the mountains, where they terrorized locals until their 1924 arrest. Some of the crimes committed by them during this period included the kidnapping-murders of Christos Papagiannopoulos, the merchant Fournaropoulos (held for a ransom of 2,000 drachmas), his son Panagiotopoulos (held for 4,000 drachmas) and the son of merchant Maramenos, held for 1,000,000 drachmas. According to newspapers at the time, until their capture, Retzos committed 47 murders, while according to The History of the Gendarmerie, the true number was close to 82. Among the non-kidnapping-related murders was the gang's treasurer, Dimitris Bouzoukis, because he told the police about their crimes, as well as his life. Finally, the brothers killed two comrades, Stavros Sintoris and Kontogiorgis, before they were captured.

== Amnesty, and life in Ioannina ==
After they were granted amnesty in 1924, Giannis and Thymios entered Ioannina in a festive atmosphere. According to contemporary newspapers and witness testimonies, when they entered the city, a whole crowd gathered to see the Retzos brothers, while the director of security and the then-marshal waited for them in a local inn. Both of them celebrated their amnesty by eating at a friend's house, and then partying until the late evening.

The two brothers then settled in a two-story house, located near the gendarmerie's local administration building in the centre of Ioannina, next to Col. Petsetakis, who was tasked with keeping watch over them. The Retzos brothers lived a very lavish life, and socialized with the city's high society. According to a complaint lodged by Officer Michalis Goudas at a meeting in Parliament on 10 December 1926, the two brothers "served as semi-official police bodies of the State, assisting police and providing information".

In September 1924, Giannis Retzos married the daughter of a fellow gang member, who would later turn them in for their most famous crime.

== The Petra robbery ==
On 13 June 1926, eight people were killed in a botched robbery outside Petra, which was later revealed to be the doing of the Retzos brothers. The robbers had cordoned off the road with a fallen tree, from where the car of the National Bank remittance would pass, transporting 15,000,000 drachmas from Preveza to Ioannina. When the car approached, the robbers opened fire on both sides and the driver, trying to avoid them, lost control and crashed the vehicle.

The scene of the robbery was initially reached by pursuit units and gendarmes from the area who, according to complaints, "fell into deplorable actions". That's why the chief gendarme D. Kokkalas and Col. Gasparis went to the spot in order to coordinate the operation and arrest the perpetrators, with the assistance of soldiers and gendarmes arriving from Ioannina. As part of the operation, Kokkalas and Gasparis proposed to strengthen the police force with 280 hoplites and to replace those who came from Epirus and Corfu. They also demanded the expulsion of all robbers who had been granted amnesty and were living in Epirus, as well as the creation of outposts at various points along the roads that connected Preveza and Ioannina. Finally, they asked for the appointment of a general commander of Epirus, a position then held by prosecutor Giamarelos. At the same time, two regiments of 'hunters' conducted investigations and interrogations in the area, arresting residents using excessive and violent force. A suggestion was made to relocate the inhabitants of 27 villages, and to settle them somewhere else in the Peloponnese.

On 14 December 1924, the deputy Georgios Athanasiadis-Novas described the situation before Parliament. Among other things, he referred to the confusion of responsibilities that prevailed as the prosecutors and police authorities in Ioannina, Arta and Preveza, as well as the rapporteur of the Military Court were simultaneously addressed. He also pointed out mistakes made by the investigating authorities regarding the case, and specifically referred to the abbot of the Monastery of the Prophet, Elias Papagiannis: "......the Monastery of the Prophet of the Sun was left unexplored, which had such a topical location and whose abbot was the infamous Papagiannis, who had a more patriotic past, as I heard, because he was a chief, but with a recent but well-known past. And yet, the Monastery remained unexplored. [...] At last they reached the point from which they should have started. And they turned to Papagiannis on the one hand and to the suspicious robber villages on the other. Papagiannis, oppressed, compelled and otherwise severely tortured...confessed what they knew.... He definitely put the interrogation in his way".

== Escape abroad and arrest ==
Due to the many errors on the authorities' part, the brothers' arrest was delayed. They fled abroad, and according to Athanasiadis-Novas: "After a long war council formed at the headquarters in Ioannina, a decision was made to arrest the two robbers. The measures they took were so pompous that all the attendees were absolutely sure that the next morning, either the Retzos would escape or they would evade the authorities, and the police would never capture them.." After realizing they were about to be arrested, Giannis and Thymios fled Ioannina and went to Albania. After obtaining Albanian passports for a large sum of money, Giannis renamed himself as Athanasios Nikolas Tsikos and Thymios as Nikolas Petre Dissos, crossing into Italy and a few days later, catching a train bound for Serbia. Greek officers learned that the Retzos were in Serbia and tried, with the Serbian government's permission, to capture them, but failed. Two brothers then fled to Romania, where they were briefly arrested but managed to escape again, eventually ending up in Varna, Bulgaria, where they presented themselves as grain traders and opened an import-export office. They were finally arrested there in the autumn of 1928 by Greek police, in collaboration with their Bulgarian colleagues and the important help of the Romanian Security General Inspector Strati Stratilescu. In November 1928, they were extradited by train to Greece.

== Trial and execution ==
In September 1929, the Retzos were put on trial for the Petra robbery, before the Five-Member Court of Appeals in Corfu. Sixteen other people were tried along with them. On October 7, 1929, the trial came to an end: Giannis and Thymios, along with three accomplices (Evangelos Kokalis, Konstantinos Kapsalis and Filippas Diamantis) were sentenced to death, while the others were sentenced to life imprisonment.

The execution order was sent to the prison director in early March 1930, but it was kept secret until the day of the execution, for fear that the prisoners would try to escape. At 4 a.m. on 5 March 1930, the Corfu Gendarmerie Commander and other senior officers arrived at the prison, while a few days earlier, the Athens Police Chief, Kalyvitis, had arrived and had set up armed police guards with additional civilian guards along the way, for fear of being kidnapped by the brothers' acquaintances. At 5 a.m., the priest arrived, with the five convicts confessing all of their sins to him. At 6 a.m., the gendarmes entered the cell, handcuffed the brothers and led them out. The two Retzos, accompanied by 10 gendarmes, got into a luxury car—whose driver was notified shortly before the execution and didn't know who he was transporting. The other three were put in a second, also luxurious car. After ten minutes had passed, they arrived at the designated location, in an area outside the old fortress in Corfu. Apprentice police officers from the nearby police school had come to watch the execution. At 7 a.m., the brothers were set at a distance of 10 meters from the executive detachment and made to stand and wait. The firing squad, consisting of 30 junior officers, 15 gendarmes and 15 soldiers in two rows, took up positions. The soldiers were placed in two rows, the front kneeling, the rear standing and every sixth marked the one in front of them. The detachment gave them their weapons, and after prosecutor Giannopoulos read out the death sentence, the soldiers were ordered to fire. Dense smoke arose from the rifles, and as soon as it cleared, all five men were seen falling on top of each other. In order to give a gratuitous shot, all five bodies had to be separated. Giannis had died instantly, but Thymios was still breathing. Kokkalis was left with a smile on his face, Diamantis had fallen with his mouth to the ground as if biting it, and Kapsalis, having suffered a ruptured abdomen, was bloodied. By 7:30 a.m., it was all over. The doctor confirmed that the convicts were deceased and they were transported to the cemetery, where their relatives received their bodies.

== See also ==
- George and Michel Tanielian
- List of serial killers by country
