= Greek National Road 21 =

Trunk road in Greece

National Road 21
- Εθνική Οδός 21
- Route of the EO21 road, in blue

Route information
- Length: 41.5 km (25.8 mi)
- Existed: 9 July 1963–present

Major junctions
- North end: Filippiada
- South end: Preveza

Location
- Country: Greece
- Regions: Epirus
- Primary destinations: Filippiada; Preveza

Highway system
- Highways in Greece; Motorways; National roads
← EO20	→ EO22

Greek National Road 21 (Greek: Εθνική Οδός 21), abbreviated as the EO21, is a national road in western Greece. The EO21 runs within the Preveza regional unit, from Filippiada to Preveza.

== Route ==
The EO21 is officially defined as a north–south road within the Preveza regional unit: the EO21 branches off the EO5 south of Filippiada and heads south to Preveza, passing through Louros and Nicopolis (for the EO19). At Preveza, the road connects with the Igoumenitsa–Actium National Road (also the E55).

== History ==
Ministerial Decision G25871 of 9 July 1963 created the EO21 from the old EO20, which existed by royal decree from 1955 until 1963, and followed the same route as the current EO21. The road became part of the secondary network in 1995.
