= Battle of Pente Pigadia (disambiguation) =

Battle of Pente Pigadia can refer to:

- Battle of Pente Pigadia (1821), a battle of the Greek War of Independence
- Battle of Pente Pigadia (1897), a battle of the Greco-Turkish War (1897)
- Battle of Pente Pigadia, a battle of the First Balkan War
