= Rizovouni, Preveza =

Place in Greece, Epirus

Rizovouni Ριζοβούνι
- Community
- Location within Greece
- Coordinates: 39°15′45″N 20°48′24″E
- Country: Greece
- Administrative region: Epirus
- Regional unit: Preveza
- Municipality: Ziros
- Municipal unit: Thesprotiko

Area
  - Community: 21.6 km^{2} (8.3 sq mi)

Population (2021)
  - Community: 614
  - Density: 28.4/km^{2} (73.6/sq mi)
- Time zone: UTC+2 (EET)
  - Summer (DST): UTC+3 (EEST)

Rizovouni is a village and a community of Epirus in the municipality of Ziros in the Preveza regional unit. Its former name, Podogora (until 1927), is of Slavic origin and means at the foot (or root) of the mountain. The late modern "Rizovouni" attributes to the Greek content of the Slavic word.

The community, which consists of the villages Rizovouni and Ziropoli, has a population of 614 (2021). Its area is 21.555 km^{2} (8.322 sq mi). The area is characterized as semi-mountainous. The climate is generally Mediterranean type.

== Geography ==
Rizovouni was an independent community until 1997, when it was absorbed into the municipality of Thesprotiko with the homonymous village. Thesprotiko consists of the following municipal districts and villages: Thesprotiko (Lelova), Rizovouni (Podogora), Galatas (Boulimeti) and Zervo, Papadates, Meliana, Assos (Nasari), Nikolitsi, Elia (Dara) and Platania, Polystafylo (Rousiatsa). Geographically, the municipality is located in a valley called "Little Lakka Souliou", where the amphitheatricality of the villages, the olive groves, the orange groves and generally the rich vegetation are combined. The valley is formed between the Thesprotian Mountains (Baldenesi) to the west at an altitude of 1250 meters and Tsuka Podogora-Zarkorachi to the east at an altitude of 1270 meters. It also includes Lake Mavri, which was dried up around 1960 and part of Lake Ziros. The valley is crossed by a river, called "Ampoulas" (water source).

Rizovouni extends to the east up to Ziros Lake. Part of the lake area belongs to Rizovouni as well as agricultural land in the surrounding area of Tseropolis.

Similarly, in the eastern part of the village lies Kastri, a hill about 180 m high with archaeological and historical interest: there lie the ruins of the ancient city of Vatia or Vaties, a colony of the Ilians from the 8th century BC., as well as the Church of the Dormition of the Virgin Mary, formerly a cathedral of the Kastri Monastery of Rizovouni (today's metochi of prophet Elias). The present church was built and decorated in [1670], but is based on the central aisle of an Early Christian basilica, from which several parts are preserved.

== Rizovouni today ==
There is a day nursery, a kindergarten and an elementary school in Rizovouni. There is also an Education Club, a Women's Club, and in the past there was a former Sports Club (XAER and DOXA Rizovouniou). Residents' occupations are split between micro-farming and livestock, technical occupations and few services.

== Sights ==
In Rizovouni there are many churches and picturesque chapels, natural springs, orchards with oranges, small olive groves, flower gardens. Rizovouni offers beautiful mountain tours along the amphitheatrical village, at Kastri and Ziros Lake. Winter is rarely snowy, but rainfall is very common.

=== Churches ===
- Agios Nikolaos (central church of Rizovouni) and old Agios Nikolaos
- Ascension (in the spring there is a festival)
- Agia Paraskevi (Old Monastery. Located in Meiraki)
- Little Agia Paraskevi (above Agios Ioannis. Located in Mahala)
- Agia Sophia
- Prophet Elias (Ai-Lias)
- Agios Ioannis (Ai-Giannis)
- Agia Marina
- Church of the Dormition of the Virgin Mary (Panagia-Kastri)
- Agia Eleousa
