= Kastri, Preveza =

Kastri Καστρί
- Community
- Location within Greece
- Coordinates: 39°15′N 20°34.392′E
- Country: Greece
- Administrative region: Epirus
- Regional unit: Preveza
- Municipality: Parga
- Municipal unit: Fanari

Area
  - Community: 4.476 km^{2} (1.728 sq mi)
- Elevation: 40 m (130 ft)

Population (2021)
  - Community: 239
  - Density: 53.4/km^{2} (138/sq mi)
- Time zone: UTC+2 (EET)
  - Summer (DST): UTC+3 (EEST)
- Postal code: 480 62
- Area code: +30-2684
- Vehicle registration: ΡΖ

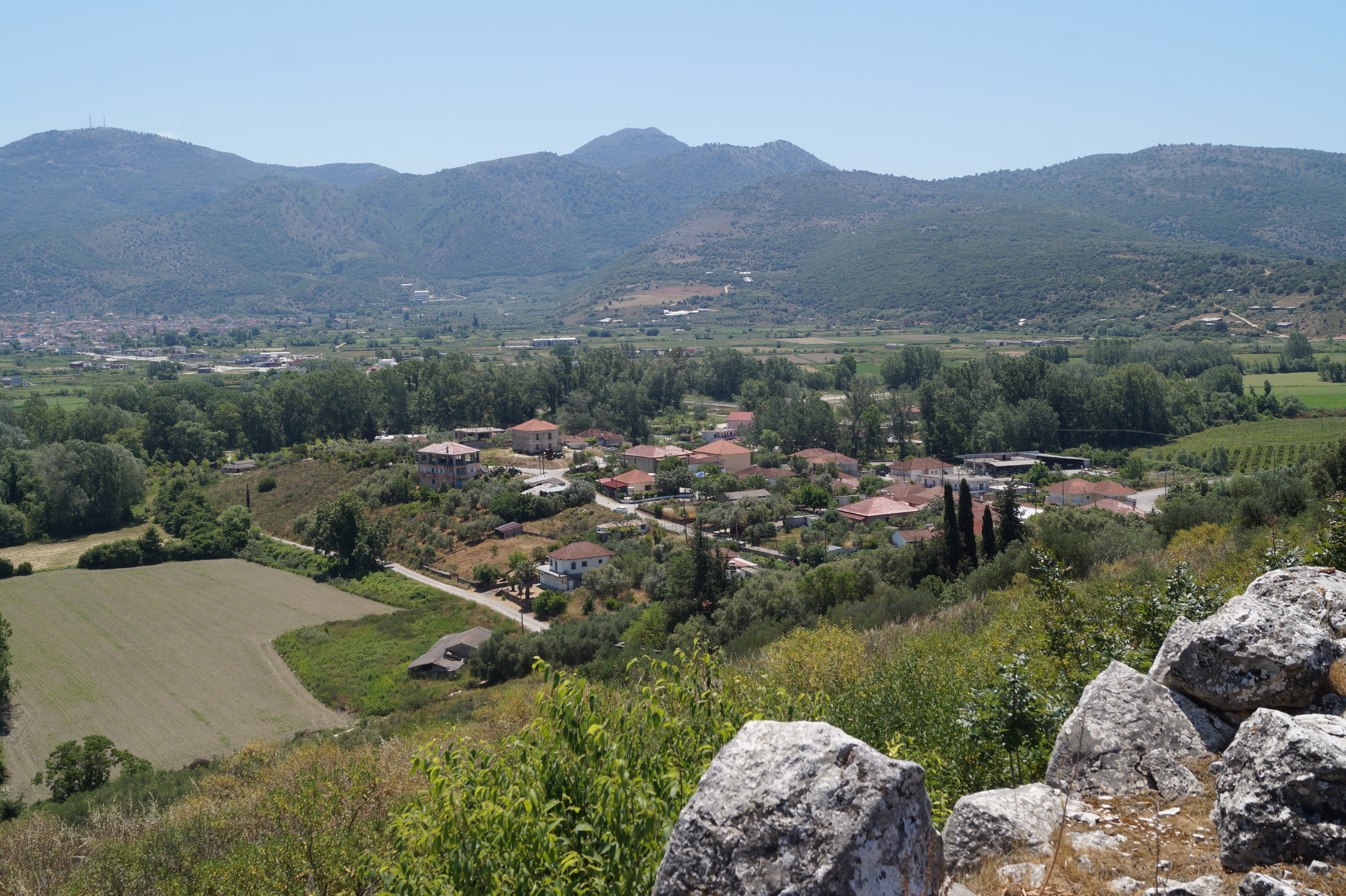
view of Kastri

Kastri (Greek: Καστρί) is a village and a community of the Parga municipality. Before the 2011 local government reform it was part of the municipality of Fanari, of which it was a municipal district. The 2021 census recorded 239 inhabitants in the village. The community of Kastri covers an area of 4.476 km^{2}.

== Geography ==
The village stands on a plain where the river Acheron passes through. It is on the northern part of the Preveza regional unit in a distance of almost 47 km from Preveza.

== History ==
The ruins of an acropolis can be seen on a hill near Kastri, which give the village its name, meaning "castle". These are likely to be the remains of the ancient city Pandosia.

== See also ==
- List of settlements in the Preveza regional unit
