= Igoumenitsa–Actium National Road =

Trunk road in Greece

Igoumenitsa–Actium National Road
- Εθνική Οδός Ηγουμενίτσας - Ακτίου
- Route of the Igoumenitsa–Actium and Fraxyla–Limpochoviti national roads, in blue

Route information
- Part of E55
- Length: 91.6 km (56.9 mi)
- Existed: 15 December 1995–present

Major junctions
- North end: Igoumenitsa
- South end: Actium

Location
- Country: Greece
- Regions: Epirus; Western Greece
- Primary destinations: Igoumenitsa; Morfi; Preveza; Actium

Highway system
- Highways in Greece; Motorways; National roads
← EO	→ EO

The Igoumenitsa–Actium National Road (Greek: Εθνική Οδός Ηγουμενίτσας - Ακτίου) is an unnumbered national road in western Greece. Created by ministerial decree in 1995, the road runs between Igoumenitsa and Actium, via the Aktio–Preveza Undersea Tunnel, and is part of European route E55.

== Route ==
The Igoumenitsa–Actium National Road is officially defined as a north–south road in the Epirus and Western Greece regions. The road runs from Igoumenitsa in the north to Actium in the south, via Morfi and Preveza: a further section at the southern end, between Actium and Vonitsa, was replaced by the A52 motorway on 24 April 2019.

The Igoumenitsa–Actium National Road includes the Aktio–Preveza Undersea Tunnel, and is part of European route E55: it is also numbered the EO102 for statistical purposes by the National Statistical Service of Greece (ESYE). The national road runs concurrently with the EO19 from Nicopolis to the Fraxyla roundabout (near Nea Thesi).

== History ==
Ministerial Decision DMEO/e/O/1308 of 15 December 1995 created the Igoumenitsa–Actium National Road, and subclassified the road as part of the secondary network.

The Preveza–Actium section was originally defined in 1955 as part of the EO19, which ran between Amfilochia and Lefkada, with a branch to Preveza: it was one of three sections to not appear in Ministerial Decision G25871 of 9 July 1963 (the other being the current EO19 north of Neraida, and the EO73).

== Fraxyla–Limpochoviti National Road ==
The Fraxyla–Limpochoviti National Road (Greek: Εθνική Οδός Φραξύλας - Λιμποχωβίτη) is a unnumbered, single carriageway connection between the Fraxyla and Limpochoviti roundabouts, north of Preveza: the connection is about 6.87 kilometres (4.27 miles) long, and links the Igoumenitsa–Actium National Road with the EO21. The connection also runs concurrently with the EO19, between Fraxyla roundabout and the village of Archangelos.

The Fraxyla–Limpochoviti National Road was created by Ministerial Decision DMEO/e/O/1308 of 15 December 1995, making it part of the secondary national network, and was numbered the EO102β for statistical purposes by the National Statistical Service of Greece (ESYE) in 1998.
