= Ammoudia =

Ammoudia may refer to the following places in Greece:

- Ammoudia, Preveza, a village in the Preveza regional unit
- Ammoudia, Serres, a village in the Serres regional unit
