= Konstantinos Sapountzakis =

Hellenic Army general

- Κωνσταντίνος Σαπουντζάκης
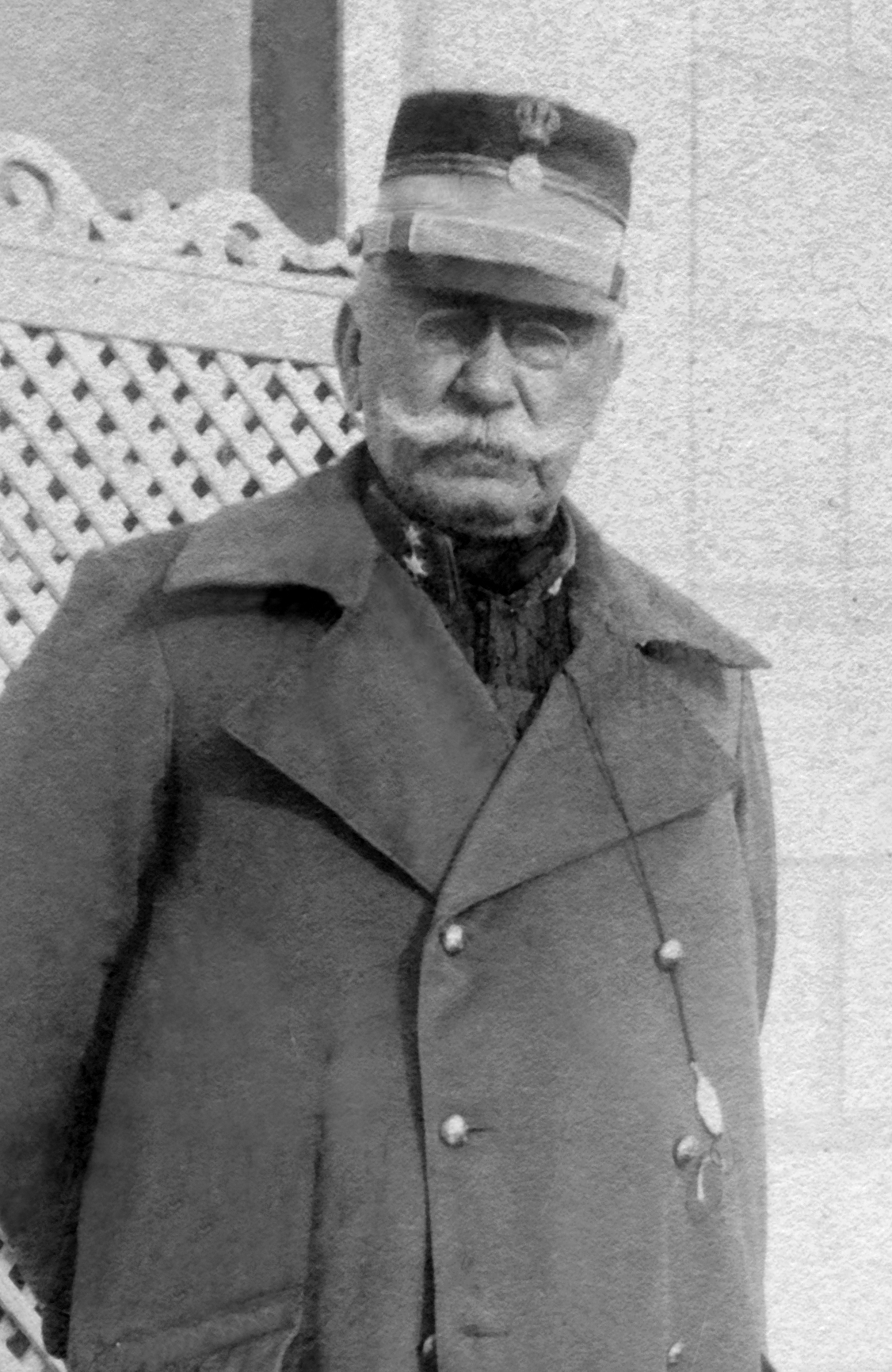
- Konstantinos Sapountzakis at Filippiada c. 1913
- Born: c. 1846; Rethymno, Crete, Ottoman Empire (now Greece)
- Died: c. 1931 (aged 84–85); Athens, Second Hellenic Republic
- Education: Hellenic Military Academy
- Relatives: Vasileios Sapountzakis (Father)
- Military career
- Allegiance: Kingdom of Greece
- Branch: Hellenic Army
- Service years: 1865–1913
- Rank: Lieutenant General
- Commands: Army General Command; Army of Epirus; 6th Infantry Division; 8th Infantry Division
- Conflicts: Cretan Revolt (1866–69); Greco-Turkish War (1897); Balkan Wars; First Balkan War; Battle of Pente Pigadia; Battle of Bizani; Second Balkan War
- Awards: Grand Commander of the Order of the Redeemer
- Other work: Aide-de-Camp to Crown Prince Constantine; Director of the Army Pension Fund

Konstantinos Sapountzakis (Greek: Κωνσταντίνος Σαπουντζάκης; c. 1846–1931) was a Hellenic Army officer. He is notable as the first head of the Hellenic Army General Staff and as the first commander of the Army of Epirus during the First Balkan War.

== Early career ==
The son of Lieutenant General Vasileios Sapountzakis, he was born in Nafplio in about 1846. He entered the Hellenic Army Academy, graduating as an artillery adjutant in 1865. He became a second lieutenant on 9 May 1867, a lieutenant in 1873, captain II class in 1878, captain I class in 1880, major in 1882, lieutenant colonel in 1890, and full colonel in 1896. In 1867 he returned to Crete, and with his father fought in the ongoing Cretan uprising. Following the failure of the revolt, he was sent for studies abroad, in Germany, Britain and France.

He was appointed professor of military technology at the Army Academy, as well as tutor and aide de camp to Crown Prince Constantine. At the outbreak of the Greco-Turkish War of 1897, with the rank of colonel, he assumed the duties of chief of staff to the Crown Prince, who exercised the overall command of the main Greek field force, the Army of Thessaly. Badly trained and led, the Greek Army was defeated and forced to retreat. Sapountzakis was subsequently dismissed from his duties.

== Chief of the General Staff and Balkan Wars ==
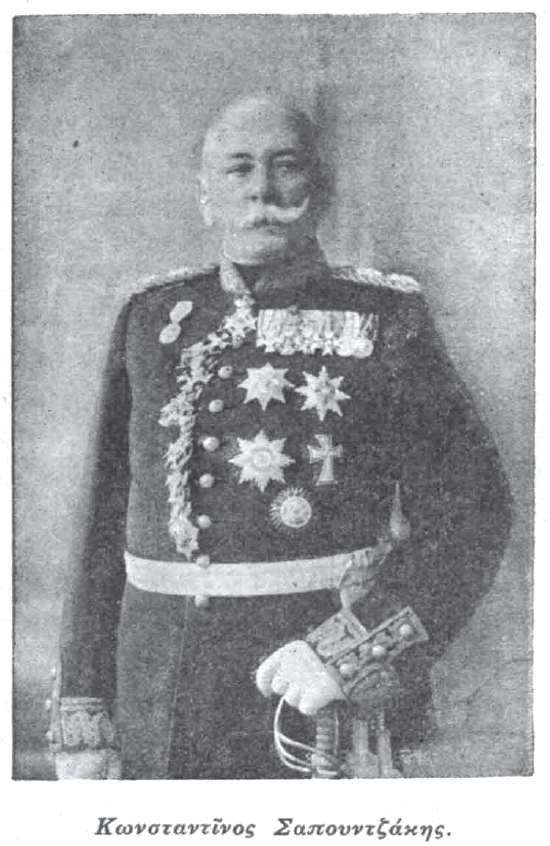
Photograph of Lt Gen Sapountzakis

In 1899, he was named head of the Personnel Department in the Ministry for Military Affairs, and in 1901 he was made chief of staff of the Army General Command, which became the Hellenic Army General Staff in 1904, with Sapountzakis its first head. From this position, he supervised the reorganization of the Army under the Georgios Theotokis cabinets.

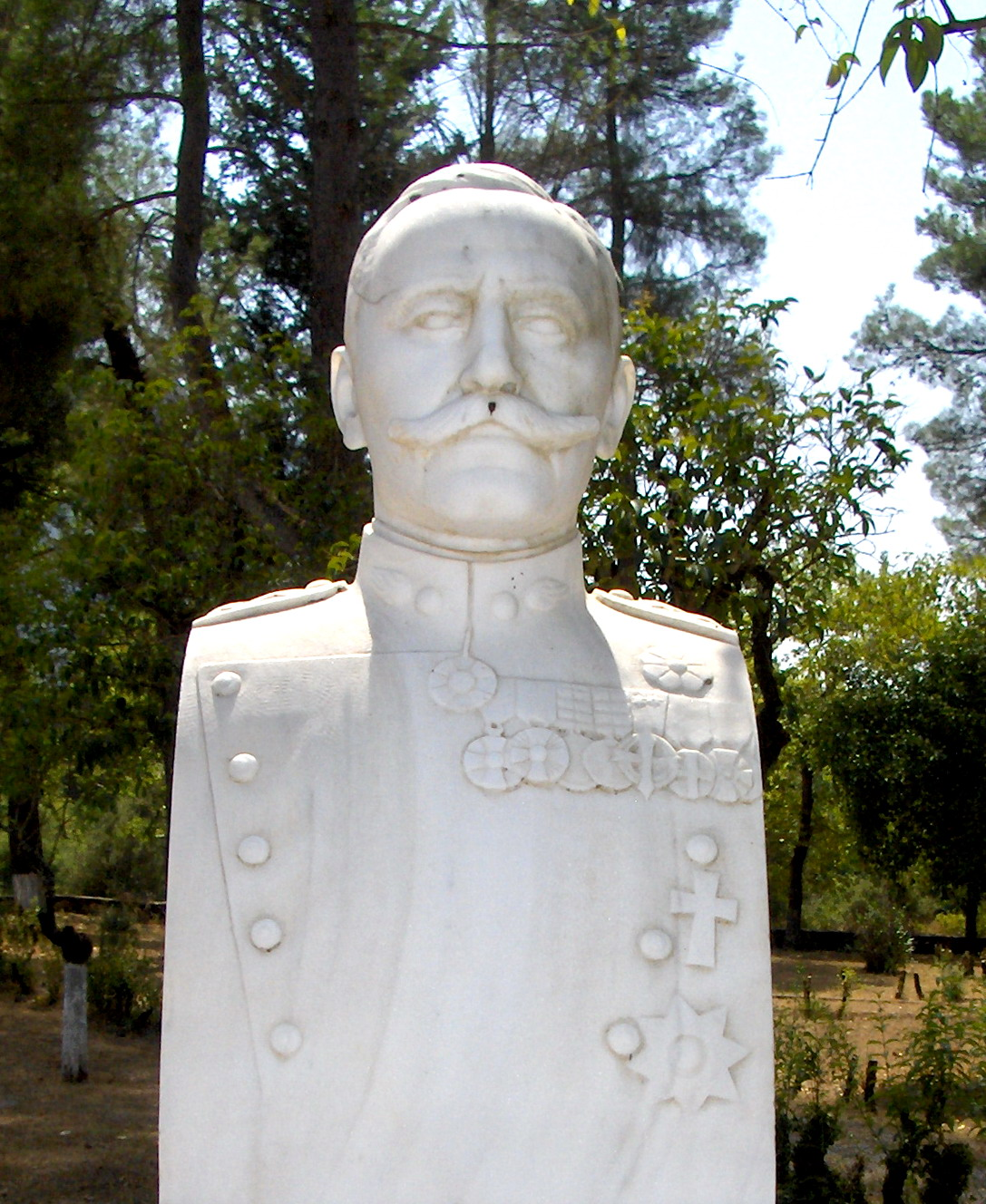
Marble bust of Lt Gen Sapountzakis at the Emin Aga inn, Ioannina.

Promoted to major General in 1909, in 1910–12 he was Chief of the Army Staff Service of the Ministry for Military Affairs. On 9 April 1912 he was appointed prospective commander-in-chief of the Army of Thessaly in wartime, as well as chairman of the Revisionary Military Tribunal. In the same year he was promoted to lieutenant general. With the outbreak of the First Balkan War, on 5 October 1912, he was placed in charge of the Army of Epirus, a post he held until 11 February 1913. The Army of Epirus was by far the smaller of the two field armies fielded by Greece and effectively comprised a small infantry division, with 8,197 men and 24 guns. Faced with superior Ottoman forces (some 15,000 men with 32 guns of the 23rd Regular and 23rd Reserve Divisions) as well as the strongly fortified position of Bizani, which guarded the southern approaches to Ioannina, its mission was entirely secondary to the main Army of Thessaly, led again by Crown Prince Constantine.

Nevertheless, the Greeks advanced and took Preveza on 21 October 1912, and repulsed an Ottoman counteroffensive in the Battle of Pente Pigadia on 24–30 October. Operations subsequently stalled as both sides awaited reinforcements. With the arrival of the 2nd Infantry Division, the Greeks resumed their offensive towards Ioannina on 12 December. Despite early success and the capture of Aetorrachi ridge, the Greek assault faltered against the guns of Bizani and successive Ottoman counter-offensives. The offensive was over by December 10, and operations degenerated into positional warfare. As more forces were being pulled from Macedonia towards Epirus, Crown Prince Constantine came to assume command in Epirus in January 1913, while Sapountzakis was relegated to command a detachment comprising the 6th and 8th Infantry Divisions. From this post he participated in the final capture of Bizani and Ioannina on 22 February 1913.

Following the fall of Ioannina, Sapountzakis retired from the Army. He was appointed director of the Army Pension Fund in 1926–29, and died in 1931. He was married but had no children.

== Sources ==
- Συνοπτική Ιστορία του Γενικού Επιτελείου Στρατού 1901–2001 [A Concise History of the Hellenic Army General Staff 1901–2001] (in Greek). Athens: Hellenic Army History Directorate. 2001. ISBN 960-7897-44-7.
