= Battle of Pente Pigadia =

1912 battle of the First Balkan War

Coordinates: 39°23′N 20°55′E

- Part of the First Balkan War
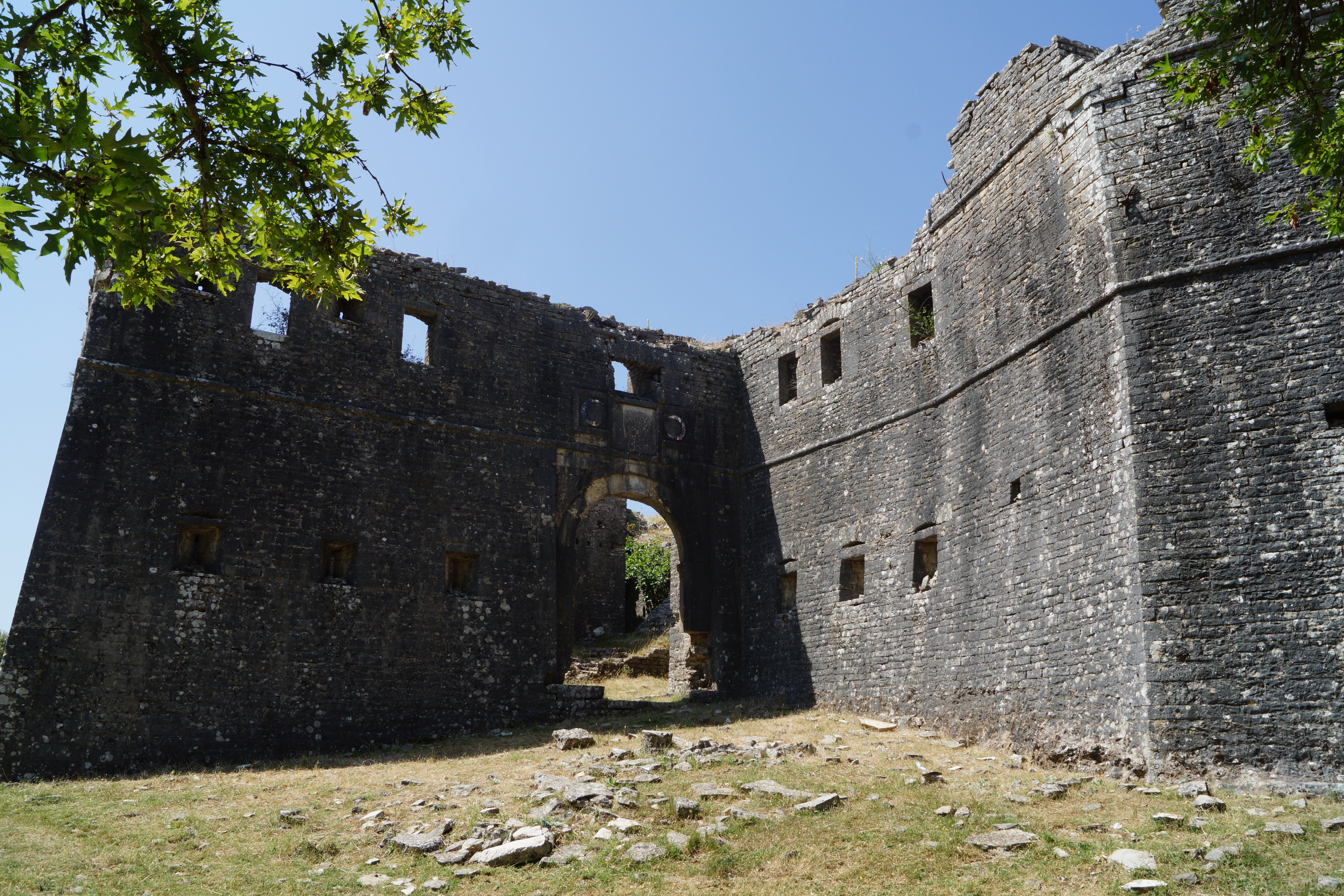
- Pente Pigadia Castle.
Date	22–30 October 1912 (Note: All dates used in this article are Old Style which is 13 days before New Style.)
Location	Beshpinar, Janina Vilayet, Ottoman Empire (now Pente Pigadia, Greece)
Result	Greek victory

Belligerents
Greece	Ottoman Empire

Commanders and leaders
(Greece) Konstantinos Sapountzakis	(Ottoman Empire) Mehmet Esat Bülkat

Strength
2 Evzone Battalions	5 Βattalions

Casualties and losses
26 dead 222 wounded	Unknown
- Location of the battle in present day Greece

The Battle of Pente Pigadia or Battle of Beshpinar (Greek: Μάχη των Πέντε Πηγαδιών; Turkish: Beşpınar Muharebesi), took place on 22–30 October (O.S.), 1912. It was fought between Greek forces under Lieutenant General Konstantinos Sapountzakis and Ottoman forces under General Esad Pasha during the First Balkan War. The battle began when the Ottomans attacked Greek positions at Anogi. Early snowfall prevented the Ottomans from launching a big offensive, while the Greeks managed to hold their ground for six days in the ensuing series of skirmishes.

== Background ==
Following the conclusion of the Greek War of Independence, the Megali Idea (Great Idea) ideology came to dominate Greek foreign policy. The ultimate goal of the Megali Idea was the incorporation of all areas traditionally populated by Greeks into an independent Greek state. The disastrous Greek defeat in the short Greco-Turkish War of 1897 exposed major flaws in the Greek Army's organization, training and logistics. Upon his appointment in December 1905, Georgios Theotokis became the first postwar Greek prime minister to focus his attention on strengthening the army. He established the National Defense Fund which financed the purchase of large quantities of ammunition. In addition a new table of organization was introduced for the country's navy and army, the latter being augmented by numerous artillery batteries. Theotokis' resignation in January 1909 and the perceived neglect of the armed forces by his successor resulted in the Goudi coup seven months later. Rather than taking power for themselves, the putschists invited Cretan politician Eleftherios Venizelos to rule the country. Venizelos followed in Theotokis' footsteps by rearming and retraining the military, enacting extensive fortification and infrastructure works, purchasing new weapons, and recalling the reservists for training.

The climax of this effort was the invitation in 1911 of a British naval mission and a French military mission. The British mission was headed by Rear Admiral Lionel Grant Tufnell, who placed an emphasis on gunnery practice and fleet maneuvers, while his assistants introduced a new fuse for the Whitehead torpedo. The French mission under Brigadier General Joseph Paul Eydoux focused its attention on improving discipline and training senior officers in large formation operations. The Hellenic Army Academy was modeled after the École spéciale militaire de Saint-Cyr shifting its focus from artillery and engineer training towards that of infantry and cavalry.

After being informed of a Serbo-Bulgarian alliance, Venizelos ordered his ambassador in Sofia to prepare a Greco-Bulgarian defense agreement by 14 April 1912. This was due to fears that should Greece fail to participate in a future war against the Ottomans it would be unable to capture the Greek majority areas of Macedonia. The treaty was signed on 15 July 1912, with the two countries agreeing to assist each other in case of a defensive war and to safeguard the rights of Christian populations in Ottoman-held Macedonia, thus joining the loose Balkan League alliance with Serbia, Montenegro and Bulgaria. Fearing a new war in the Balkans, the Ottomans mobilized their armed forces on 14 September and began transferring units to Thrace; the Balkan League responded in kind. On 30 September, the League presented the Ottomans with a list of demands regarding the rights of its Christian population. The Ottoman Empire rebuffed the demands, recalled its ambassadors in Sofia, Belgrade and Athens and expelled the League's negotiators on 4 October. The League declared war against the Ottomans, while Montenegro had already began military operations on 25 September.

== Prelude ==
Greece dispatched the Army of Epirus and the Army of Thessaly to its frontiers in Epirus and Thessaly respectively. The Army of Epirus numbered 20,000 men and 30 artillery pieces and was commanded by Lieutenant General Konstantinos Sapountzakis. Facing the Greeks in Epirus was the Yanya Corps under General Esad Pasha, which numbered 35,000 men and 102 artillery pieces; most of which were concentrated at the Yanya Fortified Area. The Army of Epirus was to conduct only a limited number of offensive operations, mainly focusing on protecting the Army of Thessaly's western flank. As it was too small to breach the Ottoman defenses around Yanya.

The Yanya Fortified Area included two major fortresses, those of Bizani and Kastritsa, guarding the main southern approaches, along with five smaller forts in a ring around the city, covering the western and northwestern approaches. The terrain south of Yanya provided excellent defensive ground, as all the roads leading to the city could be observed from Bizani. The Ottomans had augmented their defenses with permanent fortifications, constructed under the guidance of German General Rüdiger von der Goltz. These were equipped with concrete artillery emplacements, bunkers, trenches, barbed wire, searchlights and machine gun positions.

The Army of Epirus crossed the bridge of Arta into Ottoman territory at midday 6 October, capturing the Gribovo heights by the end of the day. On 9 October, the Ottomans counterattacked initiating the Battle of Gribovo, on the night of 10–11 October the Greeks were pushed back towards Arta. After regrouping the following day, the Greek army went on the offensive once again finding the Ottoman positions abandoned and capturing Filippiada. On 19 October, the Army of Epirus launched an attack on Preveza in conjunction with the Ionian squadron of the Greek Navy; taking the city on 21 October.

Following the fall of Preveza, Esad Pasha transferred his headquarters to the old Venetian castle at Pente Pigadia (Beshpinar). He ordered it to be repaired and augmented since it overlooked one of the two major roads leading to Yanya, while also recruiting local Cham Albanians into an armed militia. On 22 October, the 3rd Evzone Battalion and the 1st Mountain Battery entrenched themselves on Goura Height in the area of Anogeio. The 10th Evzone Battalions took up positions south east of Sklivani village (Kipos Height) and on Lakka Height in the vicinity of Pigadia village.

== Battle ==
At 10:30 a.m. on 22 October, Ottoman artillery began bombarding the Greek positions while an Ottoman force consisting of five battalions deployed on the western Greek flank around Anogeio. Fierce clashes followed after a series of Ottoman assaults which reached their peak around midday. Hostilities ceased in the afternoon without any territorial changes, Greek casualties amounted to four killed and two wounded.

At 10:00 a.m. on 23 October, an Ottoman battalion coming from the direction of Aetorachi launched a surprise attack on Height 1495 of Briaskovo aiming to break into the rear of the Army of Epirus. The 1st and 3rd Companies of the 10th Evzone Battalion and the 2nd Company of the 3rd Evzone Battalion managed to hold their ground. They then forced the Ottomans to abandon their dead and wounded after launching a successful counter-attack. Ottoman attacks on Anogeio were likewise repulsed, while the Ottoman push on the eastern Greek flank was halted due to the harsh terrain in the area.

Early snowfall prevented the Ottomans from carrying out a large scale attack, while the Greeks held their ground in a series of clashes that lasted until 30 October. Upon halting their offensive the Ottomans withdrew to the village of Pesta. Greek casualties in the battle of Pente Pigadia numbered 26 dead and 222 wounded.

== Aftermath ==
No major operations took place in the vicinity of Yanya until the Battle of Driskos, on 26 November. This action marked the defeat of the Greek Metsovo Detachment by a numerically superior and better equipped Ottoman force. Following the conclusion of the Greek campaign in Macedonia, the Army of Epirus received considerable reinforcements. This enabled it to capture the Yanya Fortified Area in the aftermath of the Battle of Bizani (19–21 February 1913).

By May 1913, the numerically inferior Ottomans had suffered a series of serious defeats to the League's armies on all fronts. The League had captured most of the Ottoman Empire's European territories and its forces were rapidly approaching Constantinople. On 30 May, the two sides signed the Treaty of London which granted the League's members all Ottoman lands west of Enos on the Aegean Sea and north of Midia on the Black Sea, as well as Crete. The fate of Albania and the Ottoman-held Aegean islands was to be determined by the Great Powers.

== Notes ==
Footnotes

Citations
