= Themelo =

Themelo Θέμελο
- Community
- Location within Greece
- Coordinates: 39°15′N 20°32′E
- Country: Greece
- Administrative region: Epirus
- Regional unit: Preveza
- Municipality: Parga
- Municipal unit: Fanari

Population (2021)
  - Community: 256
- Time zone: UTC+2 (EET)
  - Summer (DST): UTC+3 (EEST)

Themelo (Greek: Θέμελο, before 1927: Ταμπάνια - Tampania) is a village and a community in the municipal unit of Fanari in the Preveza regional unit in the region of Epirus, in western Greece. The community includes the village Dikorfo.

== Population ==
Year	Village population	Community population
1981	-	447
1991	373	-
2001	322	404
2011	216	302
2021	190	256
