= Fanari, Preveza =

Fanari Φανάρι Frar
- Municipal unit
- Location within the regional unit

- Location within Greece
- Coordinates: 39°14′N 20°36′E
- Country: Greece
- Administrative region: Epirus
- Regional unit: Preveza
- Municipality: Parga

Area
  - Municipal unit: 205.9 km^{2} (79.5 sq mi)

Population (2021)
  - Municipal unit: 6,943
  - Municipal unit density: 33.72/km^{2} (87.34/sq mi)
- Time zone: UTC+2 (EET)
  - Summer (DST): UTC+3 (EEST)
- Vehicle registration: ΡΖ

Fanari (Greek: Φανάρι; Albanian: Frar) is a region and a former municipality in the Preveza regional unit, Epirus, Greece. Since the 2011 local government reform it is part of the municipality Parga, of which it is a municipal unit. The municipal unit has an area of 205.893 km^{2}. Population 6,943 (2021). The seat of the municipality was in Kanallaki.

== History ==
The earliest Mycenaean pottery at the site of Ephyra at the mouth of the Acheron river dates to the Late Helladic IIIA (c.1400–c.1300 BC). The site of Ephyra is now located 4 km from the Ionian coast but in ancient times the coastline extended much farther inland. Fortification at the acropolis of Ephyra include two successive defensive walls in cyclopean masonry and a gate in built similar to the Lion Gate of Mycenae.

In historical times the Necromanteion of Ephyra in Epirus was probably the best known oracle of this kind in Ancient Greece.

A fort is attested in the 14th century (Castellanariam Fanarij) at the Glykys river. In June 1386 the population of Fanari asked for Venetian protection. This indicates that Venice was the sole power in the region that could protect the local population against Ottoman expansion. As such, Marino della Roseaa, a Venetian from Corfu acquired the local fort for 100 ducats probably from its Albanian lord but soon abandoned it because of the frequent raids. Fanari was still in Venetian control in 1395 and 1399.

During the late Ottoman period the local nationalist movement was weak while land property was the main point of contention: 90% of the arable land in Fanari and Paramithia was owned by a few absentee Muslim landlords while the situation of the Christian farmers was quite precarious. Since the late 19th century land disputes triggered national feeling and sympathies in favor to the kingdom of Greece.

Fanari is still a mainly agricultural area. Before World War II the local population supported the Liberal Party. At recent times local Romani farm workers are also Albanian speakers.

=== Axis occupation atrocities ===
During the Axis occupation of Greece, operation codenamed "Augustus" was undertaken by Wehrmacht and Cham Albanian militia units in August 1943. This affected the area south of Paramythia as far as Ammoudia and Parga.

This resulted in several local settlements to be burnt to the ground and the murder of civilian population. On 30 September, the Swiss representative of the International Red Cross, Hans-Jakob Bickel, visited the area and concluded:

20,000 Albanians, with Italian and now German support, spread terror to the rest of the population. Only in the region of Fanari 24 villages were destroyed.

In 21 settlements in the vicinity of Kanallaki, 400 inhabitants were arrested and forced to march to the nearest concentration camp in Thessaloniki (KZ Pavlos Melas). When the march begun the armed groups did not hesitate to execute a diseased priest in front of the rest of the hostages. The looting and burning in the villages of Fanari lasted for 19 days while c. 800 armed troops of the Cham Albanian militia participated in the atrocities. In exchange of their support, German Lieutenant Colonel Josef Remold offered the Chams weapons and equipment. As a token of appreciation, Nuri Dino, the leader of the Cham security battalions, promised to secure the region of the Acheron river, south of Paramythia, against Allied infiltration. During the subsequent operations, 600 Greek villagers were killed and 70 villages in the region were destroyed. 500 Greek citizens were taken hostages and 160 of them were sent to forced labour in Nazi Germany.

The small cultivators of Fanari who survived the atrocities saw the later arrival of the various resistance groups as an opportunity to return to their former properties and also to take advantage in terms of land due to the expulsion of the Muslim community.

== Subdivisions ==
The municipal unit Fanari is subdivided into the following communities:

- Acherousia
- Ammoudia
- Andonia
- Ano Skafidoti
- Despotiko
- Kanallaki
- Kastri
- Koroni
- Koryfoula
- Koukkouli
- Kypseli
- Loutsa
- Mesopotamo
- Mouzakaiika
- Narkissos
- Skepasto
- Stavrochori
- Themelo
- Valanidorachi
- Valanidoussa
- Vouvopotamos

== Sources ==
- Asonitis, Spyros (1999). "Σχέσεις της Βενετικής διοίκησης της Κέρκυρας με τις ηγεμονίες του Ιονίου (1386-1460)". Peri Istorias (in Greek). 2: 25–53. doi:10.12681/p.i..24736. ISSN 2654-198X.
- Baltsiotis, Lambros (2009). The Muslim Chams from their entry into the Greek state until the start of the Greco-Italian war (1913-1940): the story of a community from millet to nation [Οι μουσουλμάνοι Τσάμηδες από την είσοδό τους στο ελληνικό κράτος μέχρι την έναρξη του ελληνοϊταλικού πολέμου (1913-1940): η ιστορία μιας κοινότητας από το millet στο έθνος] (Thesis). University of Panteion.
- Meyer, Hermann Frank (2008). Blutiges Edelweiß: Die 1. Gebirgs-division im zweiten Weltkrieg [Bloodstained Edelweiss. The 1st Mountain-Division in WWII] (in German). Ch. Links Verlag. ISBN 978-3-86153-447-1.
- Osswald, Brendan (2011). L'Epire du treizième au quinzième siècle: autonomie et hétérogénéité d'une région balkanique (Thesis). Université Toulouse le Mirail - Toulouse II.
- Tsoutsoumpis, Spyros (December 2015). "Violence, resistance and collaboration in a Greek borderland: the case of the Muslim Chams of Epirus "Qualestoria" n. 2, dicembre 2015". Qualestoria: 122.
