= Vasileios Sapountzakis =

Greek general

Vasileios Sapountzakis (Greek: Βασίλειος Σαπουντζάκης; c. 1811 – 11 March 1901) was a Greek general.

Born in Crete in c. 1811, he entered the newly founded Hellenic Army Academy, graduating in 1831 as an Artillery 2nd Lieutenant. Throughout his career, he held various posts, including as regimental and divisional commander, commandant of the Army Academy, Inspector-General of the Army in the Greco-Turkish crisis during the Russo-Turkish War of 1877–78, and Minister for Military Affairs. He retired from service on 8 January 1897 with the rank of Lieutenant General, and died on 11 March 1901. He was the father of Lt. General Konstantinos Sapountzakis.
