= Narkissos =

Narkissos Νάρκισσος
- Community
- Location within Greece
- Coordinates: 39°15′N 20°37′E
- Country: Greece
- Administrative region: Epirus
- Regional unit: Preveza
- Municipality: Parga
- Municipal unit: Fanari

Population (2021)
  - Community: 282
- Time zone: UTC+2 (EET)
  - Summer (DST): UTC+3 (EEST)

Narkissos (Greek: Νάρκισσος meaning narcissus) is a village in the municipal unit of Fanari in the Preveza regional unit in the region of Epirus, in western Greece. In 2021 its population was 282.

== History ==
Narkissos was one of the Albanian speaking Orthodox villages which either due to the absence of Greek or for reasons of demographic importance, would see Greek education expanded, through measures such as the establishment of kindergartens.
