= Ammoudia, Preveza =

Ammoudia Αμμουδιά
- Community
- Location within Greece
- Coordinates: 39°14′N 20°29′E
- Country: Greece
- Administrative region: Epirus
- Regional unit: Preveza
- Municipality: Parga
- Municipal unit: Fanari

Population (2021)
  - Community: 208
- Time zone: UTC+2 (EET)
  - Summer (DST): UTC+3 (EEST)

Ammoudia (Greek: Αμμουδιά, before 1928: Σπλάντζα – Splantza) is a small fishing village in the municipal unit of Fanari in the municipality of Parga, Preveza regional unit in Epirus, in northwestern Greece. Ammoudia is located on the Ionian Sea coast, 9 kilometres (6 mi) southeast of Parga. The mouth of the river Acheron is in the village.

== History ==
During the Axis occupation of Greece, Ammoudia was among the villages targeted by a joint German-Cham Albanian armed operation in August 1943.

A primary school Greek teacher (Socrates Georgoulas) who taught in the area in the 1960s noted in a report he compiled for the Hellenic Folklore Research Centre that in 1964 that most inhabitants of the village spoke Albanian, Albanian: Spllancë) and had no knowledge of Greek.

== Historical population ==
Historical population
Year	Pop.	±%
1981	242	—
1991	267	+10.3%
2001	290	+8.6%
2011	308	+6.2%
2021	208	−32.5%

== See also ==
- List of settlements in the Preveza regional unit
