= Petra, Preveza =

Petra Πέτρα
- Community
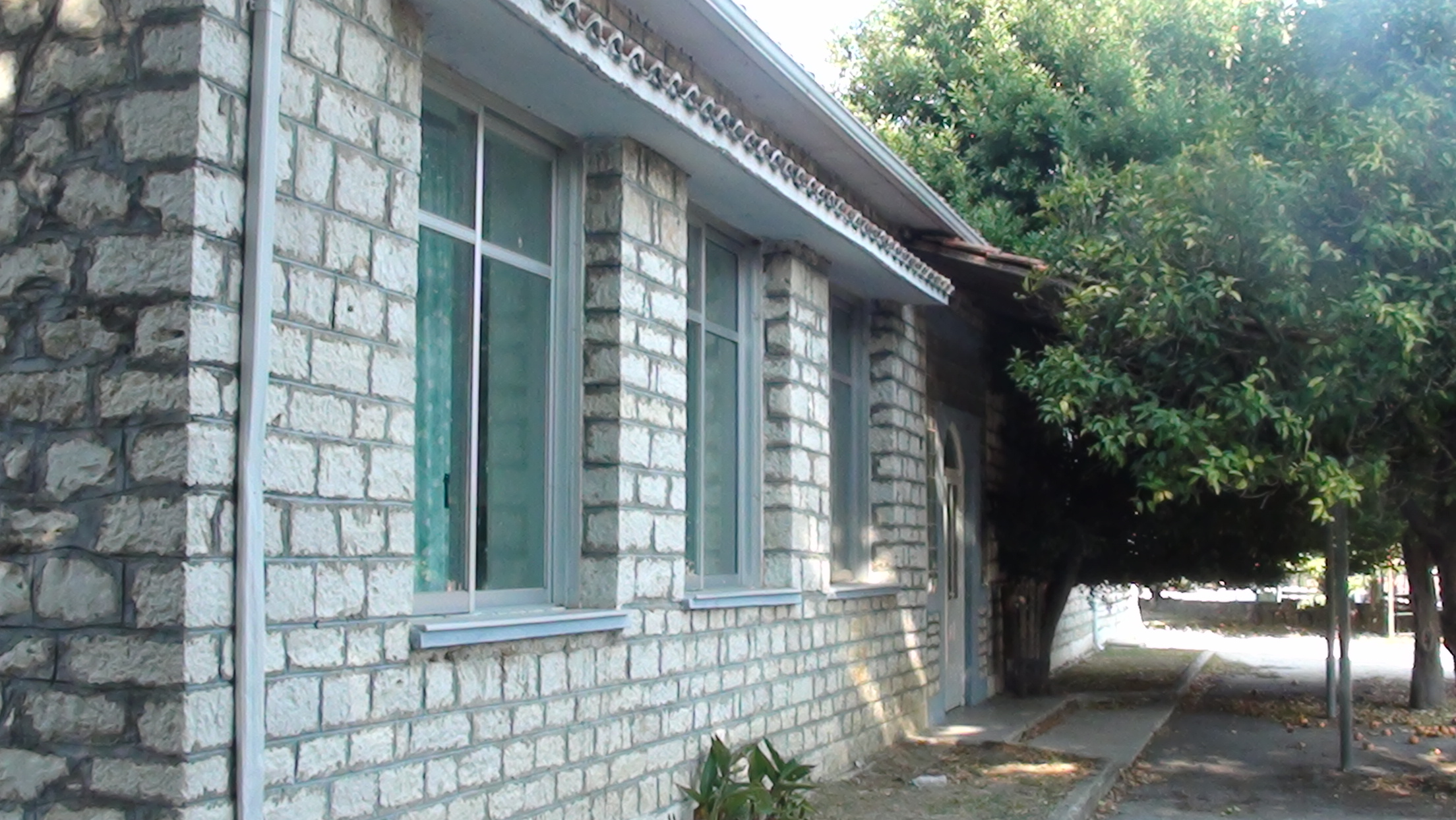
- School in Petra

- Location within Greece
- Coordinates: 39°09′25″N 20°49′08″E
- Country: Greece
- Administrative region: Epirus
- Regional unit: Preveza
- Municipality: Ziros
- Municipal unit: Filippiada

Population (2021)
  - Community: 308
- Time zone: UTC+2 (EET)
  - Summer (DST): UTC+3 (EEST)

Petra (Greek: Πέτρα) is a historical village in the Preveza Prefecture in western Greece, near the town of Filippiada. According to the 2021 Greek census, it had 308 inhabitants.

The exact origin of the name " Petra " is not known, but according to Serafim Xenopoulos, the village was named after its place on the east side of a rocky hill.
