= Battle of Menina =

1944 battle in Greece

Date	17 August 1944
Location	Menina, Thesprotia
Result	EDES victory

Belligerents
(Kingdom of Greece) National Republican Greek League (EDES)	(Nazi Germany) Germany: Balli Kombëtar

Commanders and leaders
Lt. Colonel Vasileios Kamaras; Major Georgios Agoros; Major David Wallace (British) †	Unknown

Strength
10th Division of EDES (400 engaged)	Company of the 1st Mountain Division; Cham collaborationist militia

Casualties and losses
22 killed, 53 wounded	90 killed, 100 missing or taken prisoner

The Battle of Menina (Greek: Μάχη της Μενίνας) was conducted by the Greek resistance group EDES against the German garrison of the village Menina (now known as Neraida), Thesprotia, during the German occupation of Greece. They were successful and captured a large quantity of supplies.

== Background ==
Guerilla units of the EDES resistance undertook several sabotage missions against the Wehrmacht as soon as the later began its withdrawal from Greece. The 10th Division of EDES was active in the wider region of Preveza and managed in various clashed to block the movement of the Germans from Preveza to the regional capital of Epirus, Ioannina. Nazi German and Cham Albanian collaborator units were stationed in various positions in the sectors of Filiates, Igoumenitsa and Filiates. Meanwhile, the Allied High Command in Middle East ordered the advance of the EDES units in strategic positions in the west coast of Epirus. The defense of Menina was of vital importance for the German army since it a main transportation hub in Epirus. As such the Germans as well as their collaborators have turned Menina into a major stronghold.

== Offensive ==
The main thrust of the offensive in Menina was undertaken by EDES' Sacred Band which belonged to its 3/40 Regiment. After a 2-day battle the German-Cham units were dispersed and the area was secured.

== Result ==
Among the Greek resistance there were 25 dead, while the Axis counted 87. After the victorious battle the Muslim Cham population under the state of panic and in fear of reprisals fled north to Albania. Moreover, EDES captured 109 Axis soldiers in addition to military material.

== Sources ==
- Flitouris, Athanasios (1998). "Το αντάρτικο του ΕΔΕΣ στην Ήπειρο". Docplayer.gr. University of Ioannina.
