= Greek National Road 19 =

Trunk road in Greece

National Road 19
- Εθνική Οδός 19
- Route of the EO19 road, in blue

Route information
- Length: 124.8 km (77.5 mi)
- Existed: 9 July 1963–present
- History: Renumbered from the EO18 on 15 December 1995

Major junctions
- South end: Nicopolis
- North end: Border with Albania (Mavromati)

Location
- Country: Greece
- Regions: Epirus
- Primary destinations: Nicopolis; Kanallaki; Paramythia; Neraida (Menina); Filiates; Sagiada; Border with Albania (Mavromati)

Highway system
- Highways in Greece; Motorways; National roads
| ← EO17 | → EO20 |

National Road 19 (Greek: Εθνική Οδός 19), abbreviated as the EO19, is a national road in northwestern Greece. The EO19 runs through the Epirus region, from Nicopolis (near Preveza) to the border with Albania at Mavromati (near Konispol).

The EO19 was created as National Road 18 (EO18) in 1963, originally running from Nicopolis to Neraida: in 1995, it adopted its current number, and was extended towards Sagiada.

== Route ==
The EO19 is officially defined as a north–south road through the Epirus region: it runs between Nicopolis (near Preveza) to the south and the border with Albania at Mavromati (near Konispol) to the north, via Kanallaki, Paramythia, Neraida (Menina), Filiates, and Sagiada. At the border, the EO19 connects with the Albanian SH 97 road.

The EO19 runs concurrently with the EO6 for a short distance at Neraida, and with the Fraxyla–Limpochoviti and Igoumenitsa–Actium national roads between Nicopolis and Archangelos.

== History ==
Ministerial Decision G25871 of 9 July 1963 created the then-EO18 from most of the short-lived (1955–1963) EO27, from Nicopolis to Neraida. In 1995, Ministerial Decision DMEO/e/O/1308 of 15 December 1995 renumbered to EO18 to the EO19, and extended the road over the remainder of the old EO27 towards Sagiada: thus the EO19 is the only national road under the current system to be fully renumbered.
