= George and Michel Tanielian =

Lebanese serial killers

- Born: Qamishli, Syria
- Other names: "The Taxi Driver Killers"; The Bou Hanna Brothers
- Conviction: Murder (11 counts)
- Penalty: Death

Details
- Victims: 11
- Span of crimes: July – November 2011
- Country: Lebanon
- State: Mount Lebanon
- Date apprehended: 2011

George and Michel Tanielian (born in Qamishli, Syria; years of birth unknown), known as The Taxi Driver Killers, are a pair of Syrian brothers and serial killers, responsible for the murders of 11 taxi drivers and passengers in Lebanon's Matn District between July and November 2011. Although initially their other brothers were also suspected of the crimes, George and Michel were found guilty and sentenced to death, and are still awaiting execution.

== Early life ==
Born into an Armenian family with three other brothers (Aziz, Movses and Maurice) in Qamishli, Syria, the entire family immigrated to Lebanon at an unknown period of time. According to some news reports, two of the brothers had engaged in violent behaviour during the Lebanese Civil War and were subsequently imprisoned on murder charges, but later released in 1992 under general amnesty. It is unclear which of the five brothers was responsible. All of them were reportedly delinquents and were often seen drunk in their Beirut neighbourhood of Nabaa, while one of them (reported as either Michel or George) was once imprisoned for 5 years for drug possession.

The five brothers lived in the same building, but in different apartments, and all but George and Michel had dual Lebanese citizenship. Despite their oddities, the brothers were regarded as introverted and mysterious, but nice and polite by their neighbours. Michel, in particular, was described as "a nice guy who likes to have fun, go clubbing and get drunk", who was often visited by a foreign female neighbour. That neighbour had a child, and Michel would claim that it was his.

== Modus operandi ==
Typically, the brothers would search for taxis in the Matn District at nighttime, and when they found a suitable target, they would board it, with George sitting in front and Michel at the back. Once they reached a remote location, George would tell the driver to pull over so he could relieve himself. As soon as the victim pulled over and George exited, Michel would pull out a 7.65mm pistol and shoot the driver. After robbing the body, they would set the car on fire. Alternatively, they sometimes just dumped the bodies by the roadside and commandeered the vehicle to attract other victims, whom they also robbed and killed.

=== Victims ===
- Albert Ramez al-Nashar (52)
- Shaker Saeed Abdul Nour (48)
- Hussein Abdullah
- Toufiq Toufiq
- Hagop Yaacoubian - a former associate of George Tanielian, the pair had traded cars in Lebanon while the former was on a trip to Sweden. When he returned and demanded his money, Yaacoubian allegedly refused. At one point, George asked Hagop to drive him to the Casino du Liban in Maameltein, but also requested that he drop by at Jist al-Wati, as a friend of his also wanted a ride. Yaacoubian did as requested, but when they reached a small isolated road, he was shot dead by George. Tanielian then stole $60 and commandeered the taxi, which he used to later meet with Deeb.
- Ziad Hani Deeb - A corporal for the Lebanese Army, it was alleged by George that Deeb had been hired by Yaacoubian to kill him. Tanielian explained that when he boarded the taxi, Deeb was there and proceeded to grab a gun, and that he shot the soldier in retaliation.

== Investigation, capture and sentence ==
The killings frightened the local population, and the authorities had huge difficulties with the case, as the culprits did not leave any kind of reliable forensic evidence or fingerprints behind. Agents from the Information Branch dressed up as taxi drivers in effort to capture the killers in the act, but without success. One agent managed to engage the brothers, but both of them fled before he could do anything.

Shortly after Deeb's death, however, investigators got a clue - the deceased's phone was recently used. The call was traced to al-Nabaa, and the police learned that it was being used by a minor, whose father said that he had bought it from a man named George Tanielian. All five of the brothers were arrested in suspicion, with their mother being brought in for questioning. Eventually, the elder Michel cracked and confessed to the crimes, as well as two other attempted murders, with the participation of his brother George. The pair were charged before a military court, and subsequently sentenced to death.
