= Kranea =

Kranea Κρανέα
- Municipal unit
- Location within the regional unit

- Location within Greece
- Coordinates: 39°15′N 20°45′E
- Country: Greece
- Administrative region: Epirus
- Regional unit: Preveza
- Municipality: Ziros

Area
  - Municipal unit: 34.7 km^{2} (13.4 sq mi)

Population (2021)
  - Municipal unit: 716
  - Municipal unit density: 20.6/km^{2} (53.4/sq mi)
- Time zone: UTC+2 (EET)
  - Summer (DST): UTC+3 (EEST)
- Vehicle registration: ΡΖ

Kranea (Greek: Κρανέα) is a village and a former community in the Preveza regional unit, Epirus, Greece. Since the 2011 local government reform it is part of the municipality Ziros, of which it is a municipal unit. The municipal unit has an area of 34.671 km^{2}. Population 716 (2021).
