= Thesprotiko =

Thesprotiko Θεσπρωτικό
- Municipal unit
- Location within the regional unit

- Location within Greece
- Coordinates: 39°15′N 20°47′E
- Country: Greece
- Administrative region: Epirus
- Regional unit: Preveza
- Municipality: Ziros

Area
  - Municipal unit: 131.8 km^{2} (50.9 sq mi)
- Elevation: 60 m (200 ft)

Population (2021)
  - Municipal unit: 3,341
  - Municipal unit density: 25.35/km^{2} (65.65/sq mi)
  - Community: 1,257
- Time zone: UTC+2 (EET)
  - Summer (DST): UTC+3 (EEST)

Thesprotiko (Greek: Θεσπρωτικό, "Thesprotian") is a village and a former municipality in the Preveza regional unit, Epirus, Greece. Since the 2011 local government reform it is part of the municipality Ziros, of which it is a municipal unit. The municipal unit has an area of 131.823 km^{2}. The village was known as Lelova (Λέλοβα) until April 1, 1927 when it adopted its current name. An independent community since 1919, Thesprotiko became a municipality in 1948.

== Subdivisions ==
The municipal unit Thesprotiko is subdivided into the following communities (constituent villages in brackets):

- Assos (Assos, Kerasovo)
- Galatas (Galatas, Agios Savvas, Zervo)
- Meliana
- Nikolitsi (Nikolitsi, Elaia, Platania)
- Pappadates (Pappadates, Agioi Apostoloi, Galini)
- Polystafylo (Polystafylo, Agia Triada)
- Rizovouni (Rizovouni, Ziropoli)
- Thesprotiko

== Population ==
Year	Village	Municipality
1981	2,005	-
1991	1,936	5,653
2001	1,775	5,474
2011	1,363	4,075
2021	1,257	3,341

== Geography ==
It is the capital of the area of Lakka in the Preveza Prefecture (Lakka Lelovou), and has a valley which includes several villages. The village is located between the Thesprotika (Baldenesi, Μπαλντενέσι) with the elevation of 1,250 m and Tsouka Podogora-Zarkorachi to the east with the elevation of 1,270 m. It had a lake with the name of Mavri which dried up in 1960.
