= Neraida, Thesprotia =

Neraida, Thesprotia Νεράιδα
- Settlement
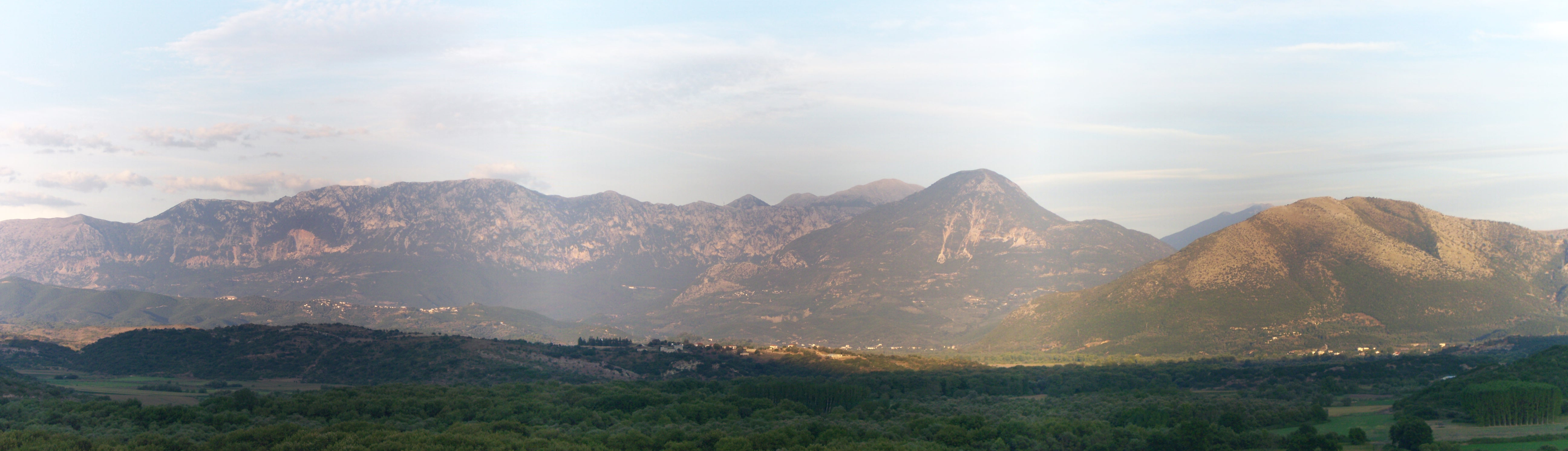

- Location within Greece
- Coordinates: 39°31′21″N 20°26′0″E
- Country: Greece
- Administrative region: Epirus
- Regional unit: Thesprotia
- Municipality: Souli
- Municipal unit: Paramythia
- Elevation: 71 m (233 ft)

Population (2021)
  - Total: 225
- Time zone: UTC+2 (EET)
  - Summer (DST): UTC+3 (EEST)
- Postal code: 462 00

Neraida (Greek: Νεράιδα) is a village and community in Thesprotia, Epirus, Greece. The town is notable for being the location of the Battle of Menina in August 1944.

== History ==
Until 1955, Neraida was called Minina or Menina (Μηνίνα or Μενίνα respectively).

During World War II, Neraida was occupied by Nazi Germany until 17 August 1944, when the Greek resistance group EDES captured the village in the Battle of Menina.

== Geography ==
Neraida is located at an altitude of 71 meters. Administratively, the village is part of the municipal community of Neochori, within the municipal unit of Paramythia and the municipality of Souli.

== Demographics ==
According to the 2011 census, Neraida had 303 residents. In the 2021 census, the population of the village fell to 225 residents.

== Transportation ==
National roads EO6 and EO19 intersect and pass through Neraida: the EO6 and EO18 were introduced in July 1963, and the latter was renumbered the EO19 in December 1995. The A2 motorway (Egnatia Odos) passes south of the village, close to neighbouring Neochori.
