= Nea Sinopi =

Community in Epirus, Greece

Nea Sinopi Νέα Σινώπη
- Community
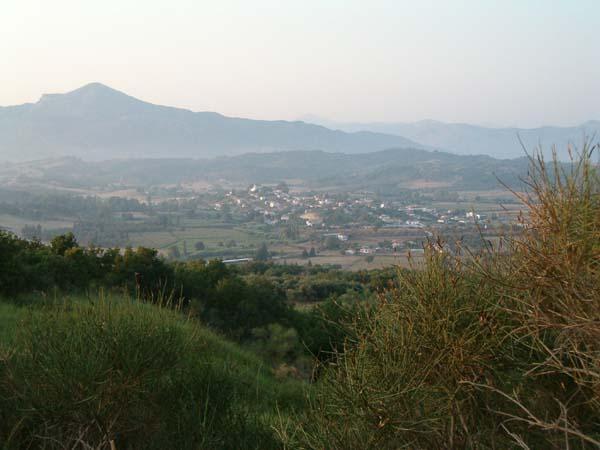
- The village Archangelos

- Location within Greece
- Coordinates: 39°05′N 20°43.4′E
- Country: Greece
- Administrative region: Epirus
- Regional unit: Preveza
- Municipality: Preveza
- Municipal unit: Zalongo
- Village established: 1922 (104 years ago)

Population (2021)
  - Community: 762
- Time zone: UTC+2 (EET)
  - Summer (DST): UTC+3 (EEST)
- Vehicle registration: ΡΖ

Nea Sinopi (Greek: Νέα Σινώπη) is a village and a community of Preveza regional unit, in the region of Epirus, in western Greece. The community consists of the villages Nea Sinopi and Archangelos. It is situated between low hills, at about 40 m elevation. It is about 15 kilometers north of the town of Preveza.

== Population ==
Year	Population village	Population community
1991	563	919
2001	693	1,038
2011	533	864
2021	486	762

== History ==
Archangelos and Neo Sinopi were founded in 1922, as a result of the population exchange between Greece and Turkey. The name means "New Sinope", as many of the refugees were from a village near modern Sinop.

== The Roman aqueduct ==
In Archangelos, there are some remains of the Roman aqueduct of ancient Nicopolis. The Roman aqueduct, 50 km long, carried the water from the springs of Louros to two cisterns in the Nymphaeum of Nikopolis. It was constructed after the foundation of Nikopolis by Octavianus Augustus.

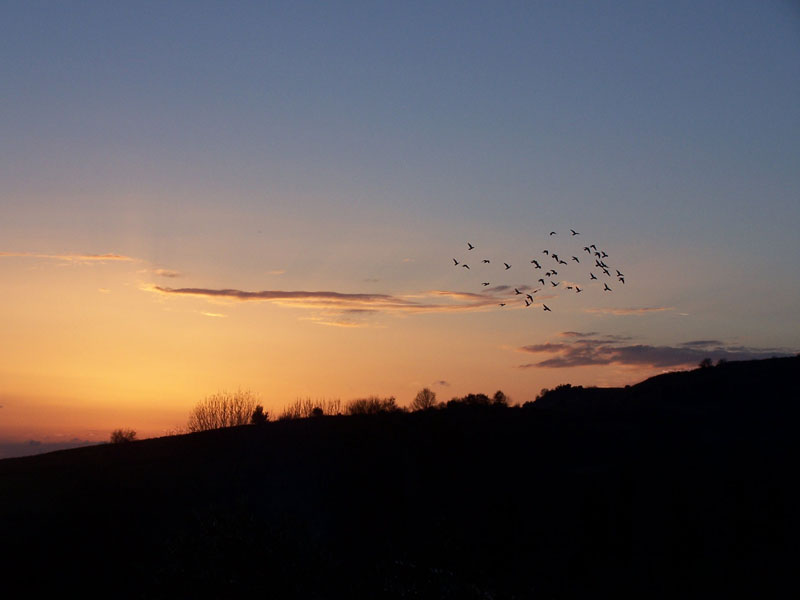
Sunset at Archangelos

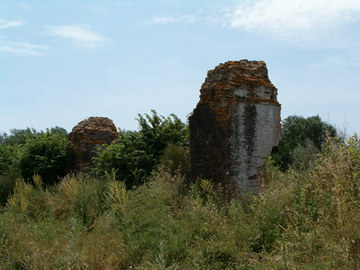
Remains of the Roman aqueduct in Archangelos, Preveza
