= Anogeio =

Anogeio Ανώγειο
- Municipal unit
- Location within the regional unit

- Location within Greece
- Coordinates: 39°22′N 20°56′E
- Country: Greece
- Administrative region: Epirus
- Regional unit: Preveza
- Municipality: Ziros

Area
  - Municipal unit: 71.7 km^{2} (27.7 sq mi)

Population (2021)
  - Municipal unit: 697
  - Municipal unit density: 9.72/km^{2} (25.2/sq mi)
  - Community: 71
- Time zone: UTC+2 (EET)
  - Summer (DST): UTC+3 (EEST)
- Vehicle registration: ΡΖ

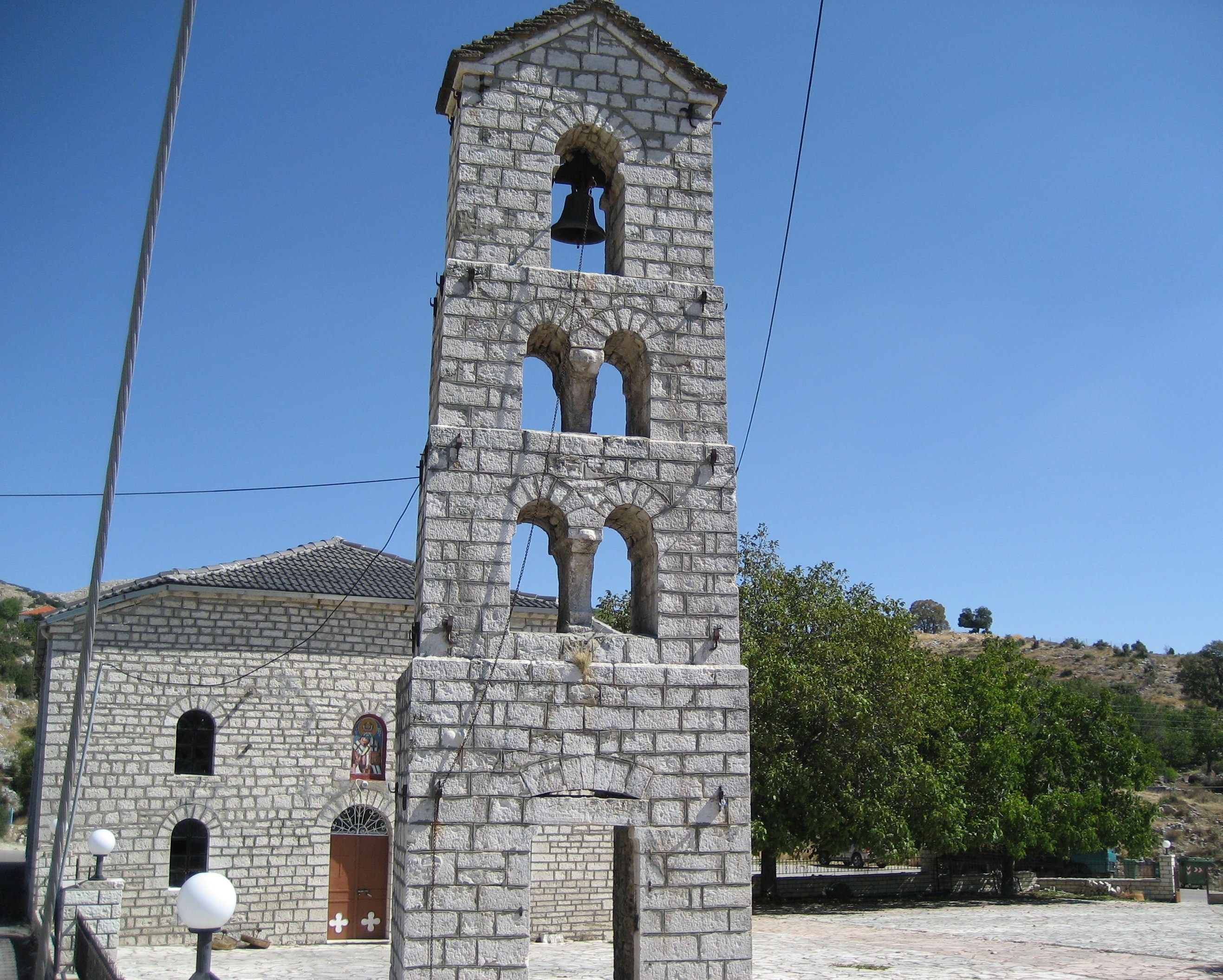
The village church and belltower of Agios Nikolaos, Anogeio

Anogeio (Greek: Ανώγειο, "High-land") is a village and a former municipality in the Preveza regional unit, Epirus, Greece. Since the 2011 local government reform it is part of the municipality Ziros, of which it is a municipal unit. The municipal unit has an area of 71.698 km^{2}. Population 697 (2021). The seat of the municipality was in Gorgomylos. Anogeio village (elevation 1200 m) is located on the western slopes of Xerovouni, in the Pindus mountains of Epirus. It has a pleasant dry climate, which is predominantly influenced by its high altitude and distance from the sea.

== History ==
The 19th and 20th Century history of the settlement is well documented. Its economy was almost exclusively based on sheep herding. The transhumant way of life was fairly typical of the rural populations of the Pindus range. Shepherds would spend the summer months in the village and relocate to lower pastures in the winter. The distant origins of the village are more obscure, however it is believed to have been founded in the period following the failed 1611 uprising against the Ottomans in Epirus led by Dionysius the Philosopher of Ioannina. The remote location of the village would have enabled tax evaders, revolutionaries and other outcasts to avoid the Ottoman authorities. This situation was fairly typical in the Balkan mountains during the 17th-20th centuries (see klephts).

== Balkan Wars, Battle of Pente Pigadia and liberation of Filippiada, October 1912 ==
Anogeio is located in the high ground above the strategic pass of Pente Pigadia, on the road linking Ioannina with Preveza and southern Epirus. On the 5 October 1912 Greece declared war against Turkey with the aim of incorporating Greek speaking provinces in Epirus and Macedonia. On the 10 October 1912 during the operations to secure the market town of Filippiada, a unit of 150 Evzones (from the 30th Battalion) took up positions in Anogeio. With the help of local residents, who were well acquainted with the terrain, they organised the defenses of all the western foothills leading up to the village. The Turkish army, well aware of the strategic implications of the pass, led a determined assault against the Greek positions at Anogeio on 11 October 1912. The assault was unsuccessful and later that day the Evzones counter-attacked and captured the fort at Pente Pigadia. When news of the fort's capture reached the Turkish General Esat Pasha, he ordered a general retreat, which led to the bloodless liberation of Filippiada and the surrounding villages.

== The Petra Robbery ==
Anogeio is the homeland of the Rentzaioi clan, two members of which achieved notoriety through being chief suspects for one of the biggest bank robberies in the history of the region. The event took place in the turbulent years following the liberation of Epirus from the Ottoman Empire in 1913. On the 12 June 1926, a National Bank of Ioannina vehicle was held up at the location of Petra (on the Ioannina to Preveza highway). 15 million drachmas, a substantial sum for the time, were stolen from the vehicle and 8 members of the security crew were found murdered at the scene. The robbery was reputedly the most high-profile act in a number of murders, kidnappings and highway robberies with which the Rentzaioi brothers (Thymios and Ioannis) were associated. Their story and the manhunt across Albania, Italy and the Balkans to their eventual arrest in Varna, Bulgaria are recorded in Greek national newspapers of the time (including Kathimerini), archives of the period held in the National Library of Greece, the University of Ioannina, and local oral tradition. They were tried and executed for their crimes on 5 March 1930 in Corfu jail. Clan rivalry, and banditry were endemic in the mountains of Greece during the late 19th and early 20th century as attested in numerous sources. The bandits were often tolerated and supported by the local populace. Petty local officialdom and state authority were held in general disregard, a phenomenon accentuated by the remoteness of the mountain settlements.
