= Ziros, Preveza =

Ziros Ζηρός
- Municipality
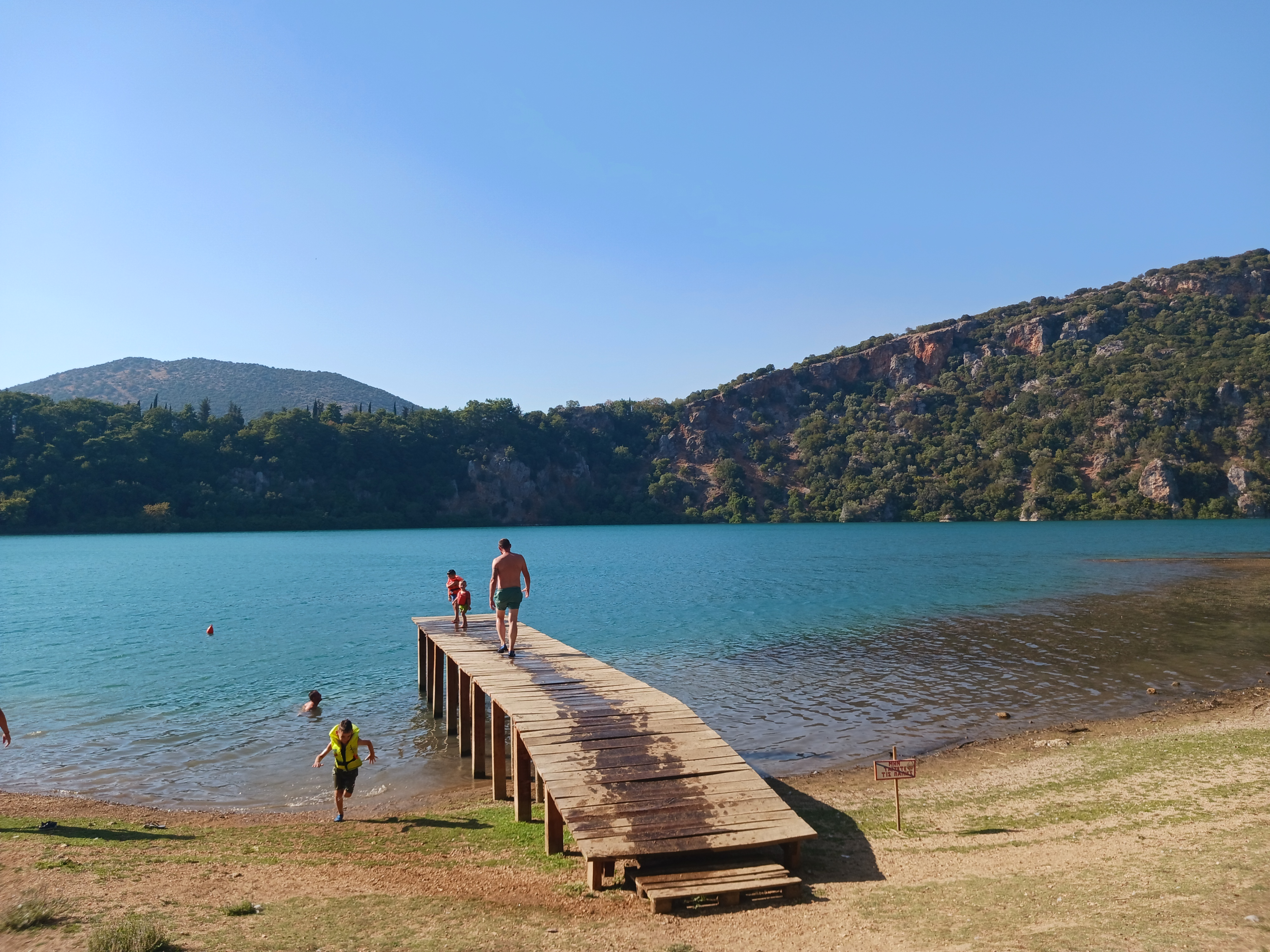
- Lake Ziros

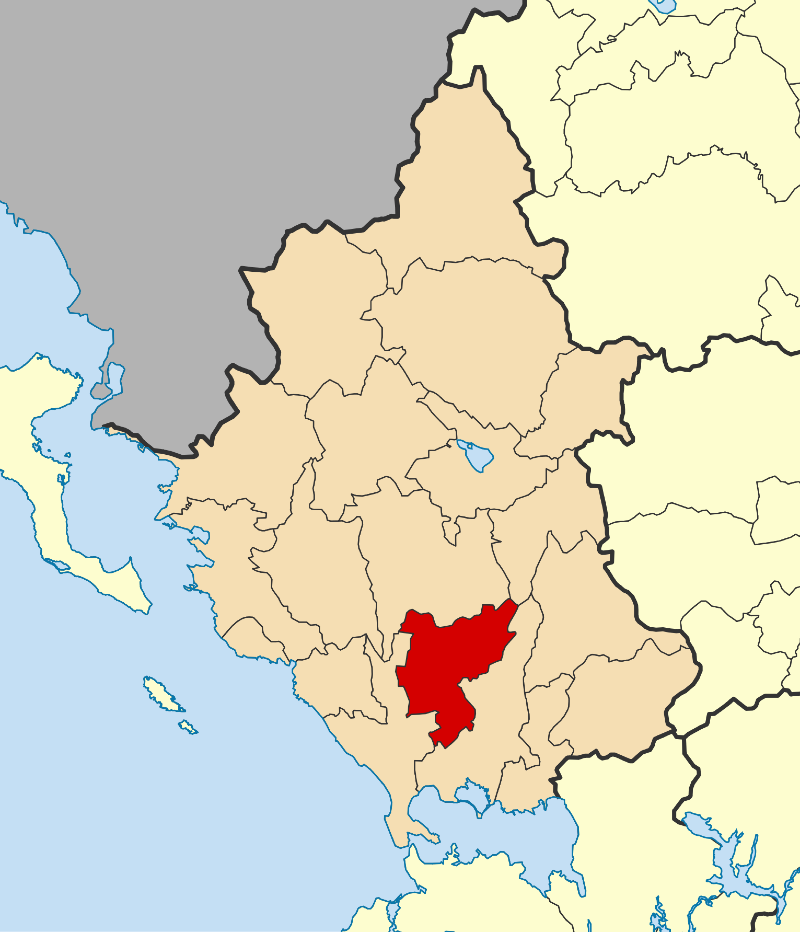

- Location within Greece
- Coordinates: 39°12′N 20°53′E
- Country: Greece
- Administrative region: Epirus
- Regional unit: Preveza
- Seat: Filippiada

Area
  - Municipality: 380.6 km^{2} (147.0 sq mi)

Population (2021)
  - Municipality: 13,079
  - Density: 34.36/km^{2} (89.00/sq mi)
- Time zone: UTC+2 (EET)
  - Summer (DST): UTC+3 (EEST)
- Vehicle registration: ΡΖ

Ziros (Greek: Ζηρός, named after Lake Ziros) is a municipality in the Preveza regional unit, Epirus, Greece. The seat of the municipality is the village Filippiada. The municipality has an area of 380.601 km^{2}.

== Municipality ==
The municipality Ziros was formed at the 2011 local government reform by the merger of the following 4 former municipalities, that became municipal units:

- Anogeio
- Filippiada
- Kranea
- Thesprotiko
