= Filippiada =

Town in Epirus, Greece

Filippiada Φιλιππιάδα
- Municipal unit
- Location within the regional unit

- Location within Greece
- Coordinates: 39°12′N 20°53′E
- Country: Greece
- Administrative region: Epirus
- Regional unit: Preveza
- Municipality: Ziros

Area
  - Municipal unit: 142.4 km^{2} (55.0 sq mi)

Population (2021)
  - Municipal unit: 8,325
  - Municipal unit density: 58.46/km^{2} (151.4/sq mi)
  - Community: 5,207
- Time zone: UTC+2 (EET)
  - Summer (DST): UTC+3 (EEST)
- Vehicle registration: ΡΖ
- Website: www.1535.syzefxis.gov.gr

Filippiada (Greek: Φιλιππιάδα) is a small town and a former municipality in the Preveza regional unit, Epirus, Greece. Since the 2011 local government reform it is part of the municipality Ziros, of which it is a municipal unit. The municipal unit has an area of 142.409 km^{2} (54.984 sq mi). It has a population of 8,325 (2021 census).

== Geography ==
The town of Filippiada is situated at the foot of low hills on the right bank of the river Louros. The northern part of the municipal unit is mountainous. Filippiada is 10 km (6 mi) northwest of Arta, 30 km (19 mi) northeast of Preveza and 52 km (32 mi) south of Ioannina. The Greek National Road 5 (Antirrio - Agrinio - Arta - Ioannina) passes through the town, and the Greek National Road 21 connects it with Preveza.

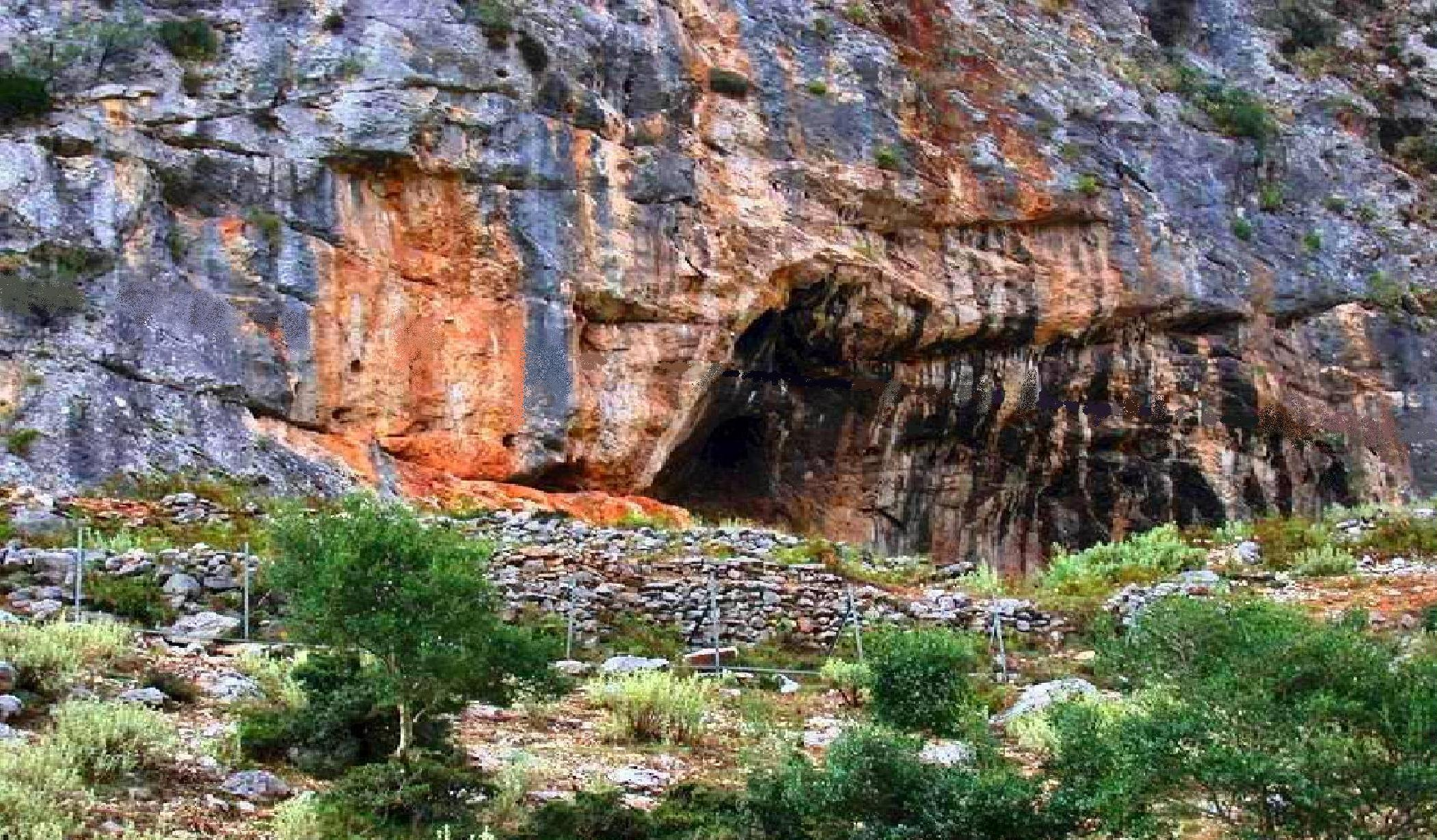
Asprochalikeo Cave near Filippiada

The municipal unit's geographical landscape includes part of the Louros River and Lake Zirou. Filippiada bears the nickname "stork town" (Greek: Πόλη των πελαργών) due to the scattered nests of migratory birds frequently found throughout town.

== History ==
The area of Filippiada has been inhabited since at least the 8th and 7th centuries BC. The ancient cities of Charadron (Χάραδρον) and Bouchetion (on which the medieval Byzantine castle of Rogoi was built) were located here. There are many sites such as Saint Bessarion Church, the monument in honor of the fighters of the Battle of Bizani, and Lake Ziros.

In antiquity an ancient acropolis in Palaia Filipiada was erected which coincides to ancient Charadron as part of the fortification network in ancient Epirus.

Remnants of the church of the Dormition of the Theotokos in the village of Palaia (old) Filippiada date probably to the 13th century. The frescoes are dated to c. 1800 and were crafted by artists from nearby Korytiani, Ioannina. The church of Panagia Pantanassa was erected in the 13th century by Despot of Epirus, Michael II Komnenos Doukas. Its south portico is decorated with donor portraits of the Despot of Epirus, Nikephoros I, his wife, Anna Palaiologina Kantakouzene, and their son Thomas.

The Ottoman authorities founded in 1880-81 a new settlement between the already existing villages of Filippiada and Eleftherochori which became the administrative center of kaza of Louros. The settlement became known as Hamidiye, Neos (New) Louros or Nea Filippiada which in later decades became its official name. At the instigation of the Ottoman state it was formed as an exclusively Muslim settlement and as late as 1911 no non-Muslims were allowed to operate in the town. It primarily included Muslim refugees from Arta which was ceded to Greece according to the Convention of Constantinople. According to various scholars the settlers were Greek-speaking Muslim refugees from Arta and Muslim Albanians (possibly including Albanian-speakers from other areas). An Ottoman school with Turkish as its official language of instruction operated since 1905. An Albanian school was opened in 1909, but it was closed down and Albanian was briefly taught in the Ottoman school before its ban.

During the First Balkan War the Greek forces entered Filippiada on October 26, 1912. Crown prince Constantine personally took command of the Greek army of Epirus and was stationed in the town on January 13, 1913. The event provided a new impetus for the Greek advance against Ottoman positions. Almost all the population of Nea Filippiada abandoned the town in 1913 after it was ceded to Greece in the Balkan Wars. They moved to Turkey or Albania. Just after its annexation, only 30 Muslims remained in Filippiada. The Greek census of 1928 the remaining Muslim population was 68 (32 Albanian-speakers, 25 Greek-speakers, 11 Romani-speakers). As of 1930, only three Albanians in Filippiada had been exempted from the Greek-Turkish agreement for population exchange.

New Filippiada was merged with the nearby villages of Palia (Old) Filippiada and Eleftherochori and as a result the modern town of Filipiada was developed.

A large orphanage facility was founded near Filippiada in January 1948 in Ziro. It became one of the best run children's homes in the country operated by funds provided by the Queen of Greece.

== Economy ==
The main activities of the local population are related to agriculture.

== Subdivisions ==
The municipal unit Filippiada is subdivided into the following communities (constituent villages in brackets):

- Agios Georgios
- Dryofyto
- Filippiada
- Gymnotopos
- Kerasona (Kerasona, Agia Faneromeni)
- Kleisoura (Kleisoura, Pente Pigadia)
- Nea Kerasounta (Nea Kerasounta, Iliovouni)
- Panagia (Panagia, Gonia, Voulista)
- Petra
- Romia (Romia, Paidopoli Zirou)

== Population ==
Year	Town population	Municipal unit population
1981	3,333	-
1991	4,040	9,415
2001	4,196	8,429
2011	4,619	8,106
2021	5,207	8,325

== See also ==
- List of settlements in the Preveza regional unit

== Sources ==
- Baltsiotis, Lambros (2009). The Muslim Chams from their entry into the Greek state until the start of the Greco-Italian war (1913-1940): the story of a community from millet to nation [Οι μουσουλμάνοι Τσάμηδες από την είσοδό τους στο ελληνικό κράτος μέχρι την έναρξη του ελληνοϊταλικού πολέμου (1913-1940): η ιστορία μιας κοινότητας από το millet στο έθνος] (Thesis). University of Panteion.
- Kokolakis, Mihalis (2003). Το ύστερο Γιαννιώτικο Πασαλίκι: χώρος, διοίκηση και πληθυσμός στην τουρκοκρατούμενη Ηπειρο (1820–1913) [The late Pashalik of Ioannina: Space, administration and population in Ottoman ruled Epirus (1820–1913)] (in Greek). Athens: EIE-ΚΝΕ. ISBN 960-7916-11-5.
- Tsitselikis, Konstantinos (2012). Old and New Islam in Greece: From Historical Minorities to Immigrant Newcomers. Martinus Nijhoff Publishers. ISBN 978-9004221529.
