= Preveza (regional unit) =

Preveza Περιφερειακή ενότητα Πρέβεζας
- Regional unit
- Municipalities of Preveza

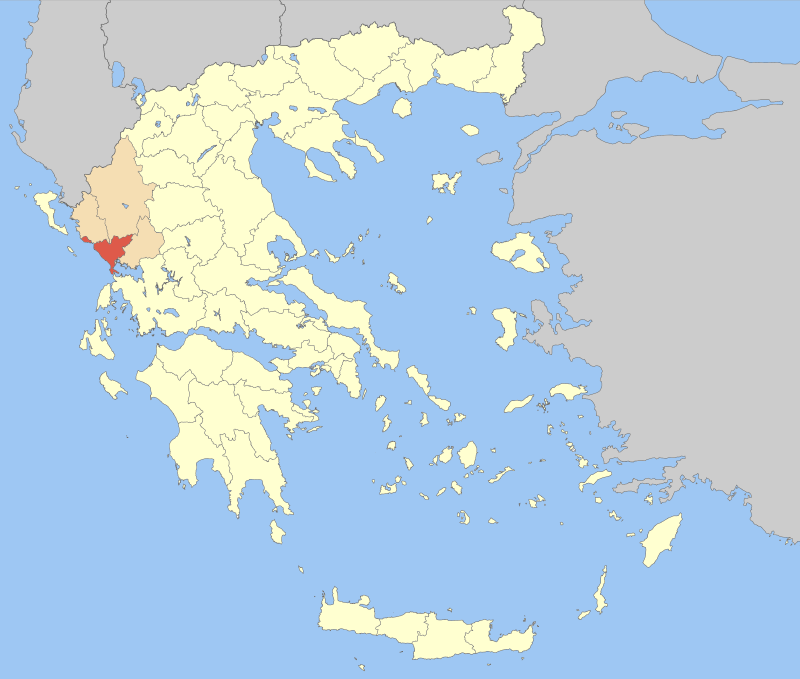
- Preveza within Greece

- Location within Greece
- Coordinates: 39°10′N 20°45′E
- Country: Greece
- Administrative region: Epirus
- Seat: Preveza

Area
  - Total: 1,036 km^{2} (400 sq mi)

Population (2021)
  - Total: 54,682
  - Density: 52.78/km^{2} (136.7/sq mi)
- Time zone: UTC+2 (EET)
  - Summer (DST): UTC+3 (EEST)
- Postal code: 48x xx
- Area code: 268x0
- Vehicle registration: ΡΖ
- Website: www.preveza.gr

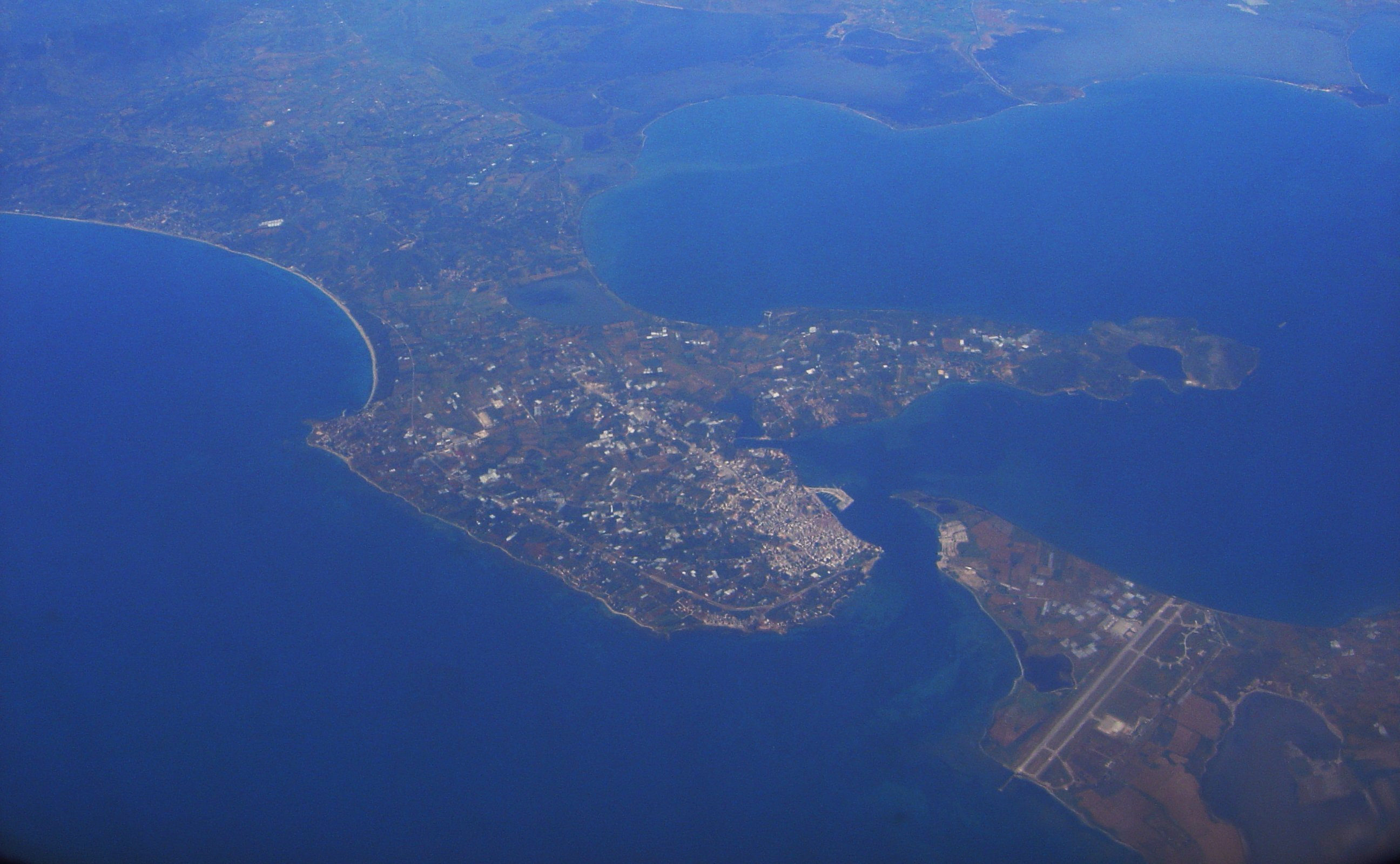
The city of Preveza, and the airport.

Preveza (Greek: Περιφερειακή ενότητα Πρέβεζας) is one of the regional units of Greece. It is part of the Epirus region. Its capital is the town of Preveza.

== Geography ==
The regional unit of Preveza is located northwest of the Ambracian Gulf. The Ionian Sea lies to the west. The terrain is mostly hilly. The mountains of Xerovouni are in the far northeast. Rivers include the Louros in the east, and Acheron in the north.

Its climate is typically Mediterranean with hot dry summers and cool winters. Snow is not uncommon in winter at higher elevations.

== Administration ==
The regional unit of Preveza is subdivided into 3 municipalities. These are (number as in the map in the infobox):

- Parga (3)
- Preveza (1)
- Ziros (2)

=== Prefecture ===
Preveza was established as a prefecture in 1915 (Greek: Νομός Πρέβεζας). As a part of the 2011 Kallikratis government reform, the regional unit Preveza was created out of the former prefecture Preveza. The prefecture had the same territory as the present regional unit. At the same time, the municipalities were reorganised, according to the table below.

New municipality	Old municipalities	Seat
Parga	Parga	Kanallaki
Parga	Fanari	Kanallaki
Preveza	Preveza	Preveza
Preveza	Louros	Preveza
Preveza	Zalongo	Preveza
Ziros	Anogeio	Filippiada
Ziros	Thesprotiko	Filippiada
Ziros	Kranea	Filippiada
Ziros	Filippiada	Filippiada

== History ==
The area was first settled by the Greek tribe of the Thesprotians and subsequently formed part of the Kingdom of Epirus and later the Roman Empire. The Battle of Actium took place in the area in 31 BC, following which the city of Nicopolis ("city of victory") was built by Augustus. The area became part of the Byzantine Empire, and following the Fourth Crusade, split off along with the rest of Epirus to form the Despotate of Epirus. During the late medieval period, Albanian-speaking communities settled throughout much of Epirus, including the wider Preveza area. The area passed to Ottoman rule in the 14th century, during which both Greek and Albanian populations formed an important part of the region's demographic composition, a situation that lasted until 1913. Following the Balkan Wars, the area was awarded to Greece in 1913, at which point the prefecture was created. The prefecture included the island of Lefkada, until the latter was split off in 1955 as a separate prefecture Lefkada.

== Sights ==
The ruins of the ancient cities of Nicopolis and Cassope, and the Necromanteion lie in the prefecture. Zalongo is a mountain village, known for its monastery. Parga is a historic port town and a resort.

== Transport ==
There are six main roads in Preveza: the A5 motorway and EO5 between Patras and Ioannina, which passes the regional unit to the north east; the EO19 towards the border with Albania near Konispol; the EO21 towards the EO5 near Filippiada; the Igoumenitsa–Actium National Road, which also carries European route E55 and the Aktio–Preveza Undersea Tunnel (connecting Preveza with Aetolia-Acarnania and the A52 motorway); and the Fraxyla–Limpochoviti National Road, which connects the Igoumenitsa–Actium road with the EO21. There are also 13 provincial roads in Preveza.

== Persons ==
- Kostas Karyotakis (October 30, 1896 in Tripoli – July 20, 1928)

== See also ==
- List of settlements in the Preveza regional unit
