= Chameria Human Rights Association =

US-based non-governmental organization

Note: this page is about the association in the US, for the Cham Albanian association in Albania, see the National Political Association "Çamëria"

The Chameria Human Rights Association (Albanian: Shoqëria për të drejtat e Njeriut, Çamëria) is a non-governmental organization, based in Washington, DC, United States, which protects and lobbies for the rights of Cham Albanians.

== Cham Albanian collaboration with the Axis ==
Cham Albanians are one of the many sub-groups of Albanians who migrated to Epirus from Central Albania during the Middle Ages, beginning in the 1200s but accelerated in the 15th and 16th centuries. On the promise of having southern Epirus, that they call Chameria, annexed from Greece to join the Albanian state, the Cham Albanians were enthusiastic collaborators of Fascist Italy and Nazi German during their occupation of Greece, Cham Albanian collaboration with the Axis.

With the fall of Fascist Italy, the British proposed to the Chams to turn against the Germans and enter an alliance with Britain. The Chams refused this offer, but began fleeing en masse to Albania when defeat was imminent. The British reported that the Chams fled to Albania with half million stolen cattle and 3,000 horses belonging to Greeks.

During September 20–29, as a result of serial terrorist activities, at least Greek 75 citizens were killed in Paramythia and 19 municipalities were destroyed. On September 30, the Swiss representative of the International Red Cross, Hans-Jakob Bickel, visited the area and confirmed the atrocities committed by the Cham militia in collaboration with the Axis forces.

== Chams in the United States ==
Many Chams were persecuted also by the Albanian Communist regime, forcing them to leave. The majority of Cham Albanians that left Albania and Greece, migrated to the United States. They were mainly concentrated in Chicago, as well as Boston and New York City. They managed to retain their tradition and language, and published the first Cham Albanian newspaper, in 1966, named "Chameria - motherland" (Albanian: Çamëria - Vatra amtare), edited by Bilal Xhaferri.

== Chameria Human Rights Association ==
In such situation, where Cham Albanians in the United States are the fourth most numerous population of Chams, after Albania, Turkey and Greece, there was created the Chameria Human Rights Association. It describes as its mission: the right of return of Cham Albanians "to their homes in Greece and live there in peace and prosperity with their Greek brothers"; the Property Rights; Other Legal Rights "ensuring to the Cham people all other legal and minority rights deriving from the Greek Constitution and Laws, the Treaties and laws of the European Union, and other rights originating from international treaties and conventions to which Greece is a party"; and the conservation and propagation of the rich history, culture, language, and other cultural aspects of the Cham people.

== See also ==
- Chameria
- Cham Albanians
- Albanian American Organization Chameria
- Chameria Issue
- Democratic Foundation of Chameria
- National Political Association "Çamëria"
