= AAOC =

AAOC may refer to:

- Albanian American Organization Chameria, a non governmental organization
- Australian Army Ordnance Corps, former designation of the Royal Australian Army Ordnance Corps
