= Democratic Foundation of Chameria =

Democratic Foundation of Chameria logo

The Democratic Foundation of Chameria (Albanian: Fondacioni Demokratik Çamëria/Shoqata Demokratike Çamëria, Dutch: Democratische Stichting Cameria) was founded in 2006 in The Hague, Netherlands, and it presents itself as an organization aiming to resolve the issues created by the expulsion of Cham Albanians.

== Organization and aims ==
The organization has its committee in the Netherlands headed by Lisen Bashkurti. The committee's declared aims are to better organize cooperation between the organization and Albanians interested in the matter. The members are Albanians living in the Balkans and Western countries. According to Bashkurti, goals of the Democratic Foundation of Chameria are the promotion and solution of the Cham issue and organization of Cham cultural activities. According to him, the organization wants diplomatic solutions based on public sensibility, diplomatic lobbies, collection and presentation of historical facts and usage of international justice organizations. According to its website, the organization aims to further the interests of inhabitants and former inhabitants of Chameria and all that is associated with this in the widest possible sense of the word. The website also says that DFC aims to resolve the issue with three main activities:

- lawfully and peacefully drawing attention to the legal position, the living and working conditions of the inhabitants and former inhabitants of Chameria;
- entering into negotiations with all types of organizations, both governmental and non-governmental;
- safeguarding the legal interest of inhabitants and former inhabitants of Chameria by means of legal proceedings, when necessary."

— Democratic Foundation Chameria,

DFC annually organizes meetings in Konispol, other places in southern Albania and Pristina where participants discuss on issues concerning the Cham issue. Some members of the Cham community have shown support for DFC's desire for the creation of the "Republic of Chameria" with protests and meetings. It has attracted support from such vocal figures in the Albanian society as Koço Danaj and At Nikolla Marku. On the other hand, the organization's structures have been accused by some members of the Cham community and supporters of the Cham issue of misusing and not properly addressing the issue. Regarding DFC' claims on the "Republic of Chameria", in 2018 Shpetim Idrizi, head of PDIU, accused Lato of working against Albanian national interests and getting money from the Greek government.

== Key persons ==
The foundation was until July 2019 chaired by Festim Lato, who originated from Vlorë, Albania and lived in Afferden, Netherlands. The leading people of the foundation are Cham Albanians, such as Kujtim Beci and Sali Beqiri. The foundation is assisted by Dutch attorneys from The Hague, specialized on issues of minority rights, Ruud van Boom, and prof. dr. Liesbeth Zegveld, who have been committed to resolving the legal issues of Chams.

On 21 July 2019 Festim Lato was said to be found murdered in Nijmegen. As of late 21 July it is claimed that instead the murder victim was Polish instead of Albanian, a body found in a canal near Nigtevecht is now thought to be Lato.

Festim Lato was also the president of the Chameria national football team, as well of the Republic of Chameria, the claimed area of which was "approximately 10,000 square kilometres". At 21 July 2019 the website was no more online. a self-proclaimed independent state, which has not been recognised by any country but was a member state of the UNPO from 2015 until its suspension in 2019.

== See also ==
- National Political Association "Çamëria"
- Chameria Human Rights Association
