= Athanasios Petsalis =

Greek lawyer and politician

Athanasios Petsalis (Greek: Αθανάσιος Πετσάλης; Parga, c. 1802 – 1871) was a Greek 19th century lawyer and politician who acted as a prefect and twice as a minister.
