= Ioannis Dimoulitsas =

Greek sailor, inventor, and independence fighter

Ioannis K. Dimoulitsas (Greek: Ιωάννης Κ. Δημουλίτσας), also known by his nickname as Patatoukos (Πατατούκος) was a Greek sailor and fighter of the Greek War of Independence. He is considered as the inventor of the first fire ships that were used by the revolutionaries.

== Biography ==
Dimoulitsas was born in Parga, Epirus. When he was young he went to Corfu and later he settled in Psara. As a sailor, he travelled to many places including Toulon in France where he worked for a while at the local dockyard. There, he was taught by a French engineer how to construct fire ships. When the Greek War of Independence broke out, Dimoulitsas constructed a fire ship that was used by Dimitrios Papanikolis for the destruction of an Ottoman frigate during May 1821. After that, Dimoulitsas continued the construction of fire ships. This type of ship was in use for many years to come by the Greek revolutionaries.

Dimoulitsas died in Psara during March 1823 of the plague. He was buried with honour and his family received a pension for his services to the Greek cause.

== Bibliography ==
- Χρ. Α. Στασινόπουλου, Λεξικό της Ελληνικής Επαναστάσεως του 1821, εκδόσεις Δεδεμάδη, 1979, v. 4.
- Ιστορία Ελληνικού Έθνους, Εκδοτική Αθηνών, Αθήνα, 1975, v. 12.
