= Anthousa, Preveza =

Village in Epirus, Greece

Anthousa Ανθούσα
- Community
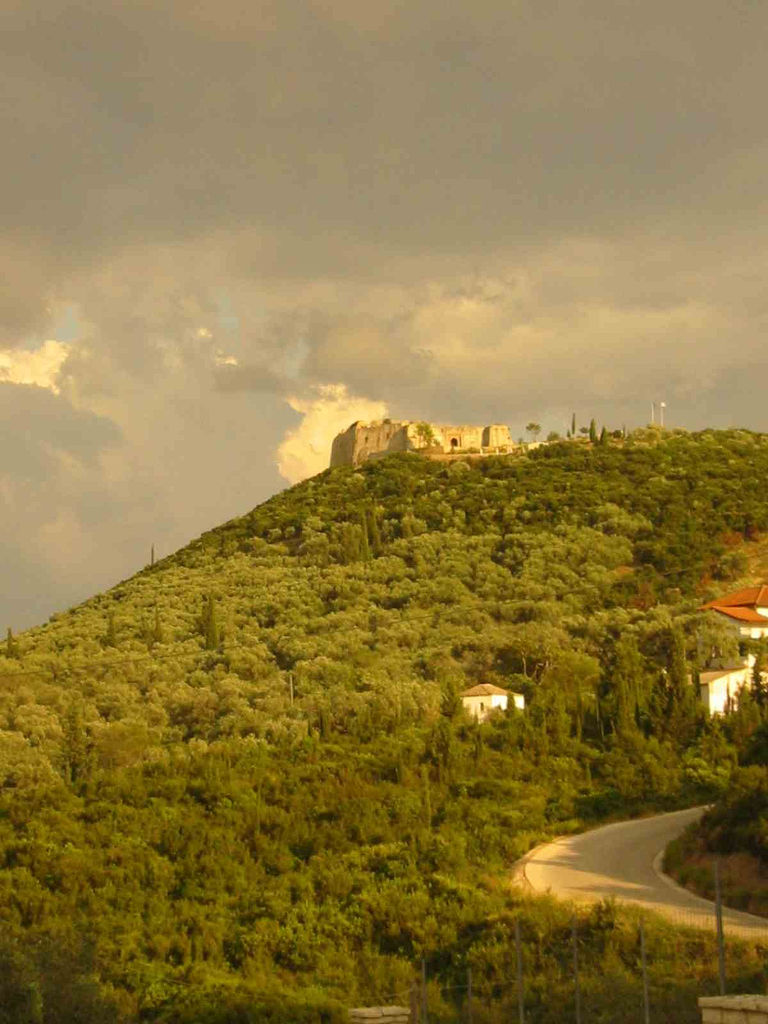
- The early 19th century castle built by Ali Pasha in Trikorfo

- Location within Greece
- Coordinates: 39°18′N 20°22′E
- Country: Greece
- Administrative region: Epirus
- Regional unit: Preveza
- Municipality: Parga
- Municipal unit: Parga

Population (2021)
  - Community: 673
- Time zone: UTC+2 (EET)
  - Summer (DST): UTC+3 (EEST)

Anthousa (Greek: Ανθούσα), known before 1927 as Rapeza (Greek: Ράπεζα) is a village in the municipality of Parga, Preveza regional unit of Epirus, in western Greece. In 2021 its population was 673 for the community, which also includes the village Trikorfo. Anthousa is situated 3 km northwest of the town Parga, under a Turkish castle on a hill, attributed to Ali Pasha. Remains and coins of the ancient city of Elaia have been found near the village.

== History ==
Tombs of the Hellenistic and Roman era have been unearthed in the area of the municipal unit of Anthousa. In the 12th century the monastery of Virgin Mary of Vlacherna was erected. Traces of a Venetian garrison are also visible.

In 1814 Anthousa was plundered by units of the Albanian ruler Ali Pasha and the local inhabitants fled to the nearby Parga. Ali Pasha then built a castle over Anthousa in order to plan a siege of Parga.

Anthousa was one of the Christian Orthodox villages that were Albanian-speaking (Rapëza), which either due to the absence of Greek or for reasons of demographic importance, would see Greek education expanded through measures such as the establishment of kindergartens.

In Anthousa and also Kanallaki, the closest existing variants of Souliotic Albanian are spoken. This dialect is spoken only by few people in modern times.

== Population ==
Year	Village population	Community population
1951	592	742
1981	-	870
1991	586	-
2001	624	683
2011	621	677
2021	628	673

== Sources ==
- Golias, Vasilis (2006). "Τουρισμός και Τοπική Ανάπτυξη. Η περίπτωση του Δήμου Πάργας" (PDF). TEI of Kalamata.
- Ψιμούλη, Βάσω Δ. (2006). Σούλι και Σουλιώτες. Ιστορία και Πολιτική (4th ed.). Athens: Βιβλιοπωλείον της Εστίας.
  - Psimuli, Vaso Dh. (2016). Suli dhe suljotët [Souli and the Souliots]. Toena. ISBN 9789928205728.
