= Parga =

Parga Πάργα
- Municipality
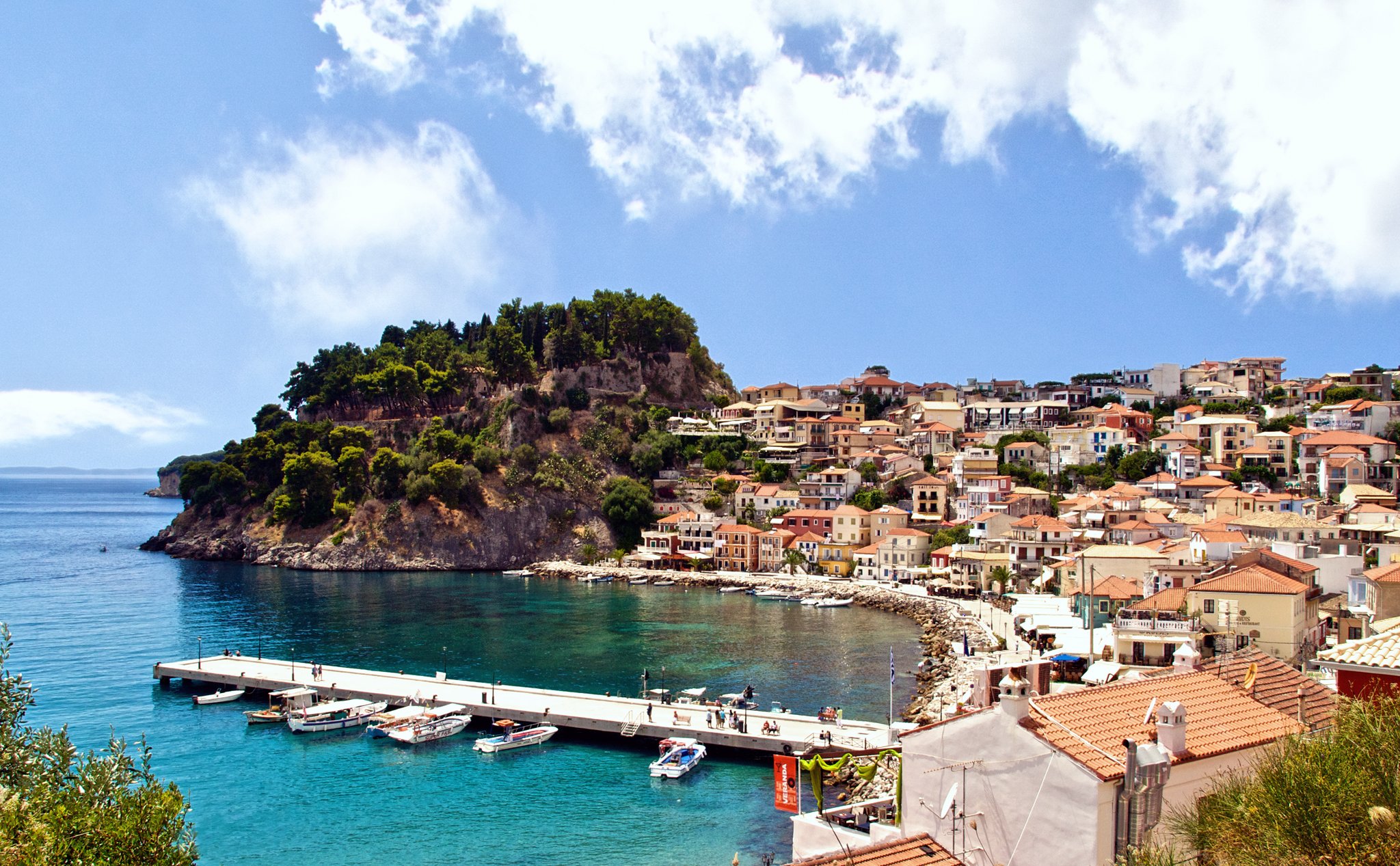
- View of Parga

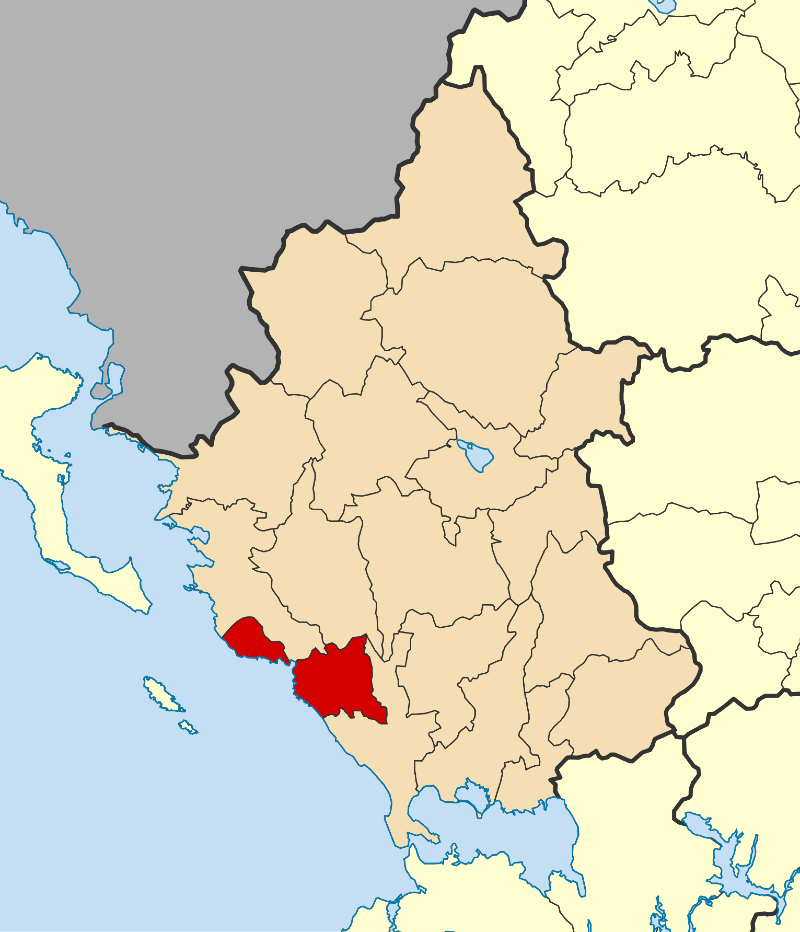

- Location within Greece
- Coordinates: 39°17′N 20°24′E
- Country: Greece
- Administrative region: Epirus
- Regional unit: Preveza

Government
  - Mayor: Nikolaos Zacharias (since 2019)

Area
  - Municipality: 274.8 km^{2} (106.1 sq mi)
  - Municipal unit: 68.9 km^{2} (26.6 sq mi)
- Elevation: 32 m (105 ft)
- Highest elevation: 910 m (2,990 ft)
- Lowest elevation: 0 m (0 ft)

Population (2021)
  - Municipality: 10,762
  - Density: 39.16/km^{2} (101.4/sq mi)
  - Municipal unit: 3,819
  - Municipal unit density: 55.4/km^{2} (144/sq mi)
  - Community: 2,489
- Time zone: UTC+2 (EET)
  - Summer (DST): UTC+3 (EEST)
- Postal code: 480 60
- Area code: 26840
- Vehicle registration: ΡΖx
- Website: parga.gr

Parga (Greek: Πάργα, Párga, pronounced [ˈpaɾɣa]) is a town and municipality located in the northwestern part of the regional unit of Preveza in Epirus, northwestern Greece. The seat of the municipality is the village Kanallaki. Parga lies on the Ionian coast between the cities of Preveza and Igoumenitsa. It is a resort town known for its natural environment.

== Municipality ==
The present municipality of Parga was formed at the 2011 local government reform by the merger of the former municipalities of Fanari and Parga that became municipal units.

The municipality has an area of 274.796 km^{2}, the municipal unit 68.903 km^{2}.

== History ==
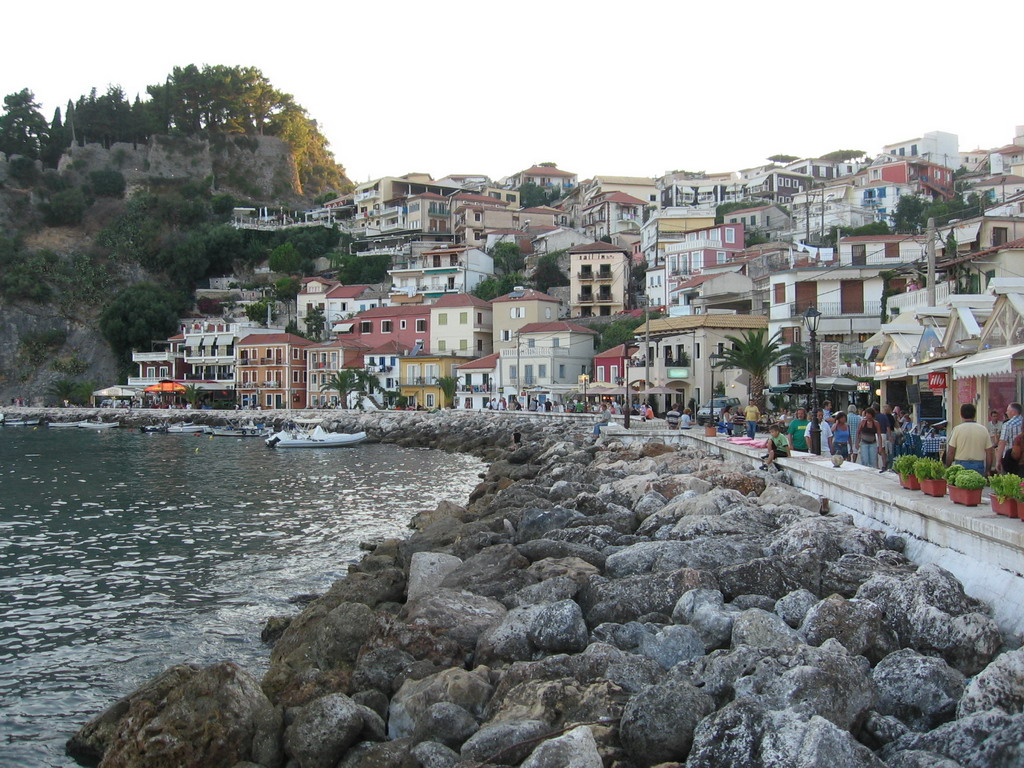
View of the seafront

In antiquity the area was inhabited by the Greek tribe of the Thesprotians. Mycenean tholos tombs have been discovered in the vicinity of Parga. The ancient town of Toryne was located there during the late Hellenistic Age. It owes its name due to the shape of its beach (Greek: Τορύνη, 'ladle' in Greek).

Parga itself is mentioned for the first time in 1318; the name is most likely of Slavic origin. Two years later, the town and its sugarcane plantation proceeds were unsuccessfully offered by Nicholas Orsini, the Despot of Epirus, to the Republic of Venice in exchange for Venetian aid against the Byzantine Empire. During the Epirote rebellion of 1338/39 against the Byzantine emperor Andronikos III Palaiologos, Parga remained loyal to the emperor. The town came under the control of Albanian ruler Gjin Bua Shpata of Arta in the 1390s. Vonko, who was also vassal of the Venetians in Fanari, was governor of Parga at this time. After Shpata's death, he tried to carve out his own fiefdom in 1400. The townspeople considered his rule tyrannical, overthrew him and asked the Venetians for protection.

The town passed under Venetian control in 1401, and was administered as a mainland exclave of the Venetian possession of Corfu, under a castellan. Ottoman raids were particularly heavy in the mid 15th century, as the senate gave the citizens of the town a 10-year tax exemption in 1454. A Romaniote Jewish community was recorded in 1496 in Venetian Parga.

Throughout the 16th century, Parga was part of the Venetian holdings in coastal Epirus. In 1570, anti-Ottoman rebels commanded by Emmanuel Mormoris that temporarily managed to overthrow Ottoman rule from the coastal regions of Epirus used Parga as a base of operations. Venetian-controlled Parga was in this period in frequent property-related conflict with neighboring, Ottoman-controlled Margariti and was the target of constant raids. The cause of friction has to do with the conflicting interests of the Venetians and the Albanian beys of Margariti for the control of the agricultural territory between the town of Parga and the inland territory. Such an attack against the coastal port was organized in 1558 by the formerly Christian spahi of Agia (today part of the municipality of Parga) and the locals of the village who according to Venetian reports harassed Parga on a daily basis. Relations between the two factions oscillated depending on political interests. The General Commander of the Venetian Fleet, Sebastiano Vernier (d. 1578) preferred a cautious policy of conflict resolution with the inhabitants of Margariti, as well as friendly relations with the Albanians loyal to Venice who controlled the area around Parga itself. In the 17th century, their relations worsened and Parga was a frequent target of attacks by the beys of Margariti, in particular in 1640-42. During these two years, the representative (bailo) of Venice in the Ottoman court submitted an official note of protest for the attacks of Margariti against Venetian Parga.

During Ottoman rule in Epirus, the inhabitants of Parga displayed continuous support for Greek revolutionary activities. Apart from brief periods of Ottoman possession, the town remained in Venetian hands until the Fall of the Republic of Venice in 1797. It then passed to France. As the relations of France with Ali Pasha deteriorated over his ambitions against the mainland exclave of Parga, the French twice considered using the men of their Albanian regiment against the mainland, but nothing came of these plans. The leading figure of political life of Parga in this transitional period was Hasan Çapari, strong adversary of Ali Pasha and very wealthy landowner from nearby Margariti, who in 1807 sought Russian support, claiming that the Royal Navy "were harassing the residents of Parga". In 1812 the adjacent settlement of Agia that belonged to Parga was captured by Ottoman general Daut Bey, the nephew of Ali Pasha. He then massacred and enslaved the local population. Daut was killed during the following siege against Parga. In 1815, with the fortunes of the French failing, the citizens of Parga revolted against French rule and sought the protection of the British. In 1819, the British ceded control the city to Ali Pasha of Ioannina (the subject of Francesco Hayez's later painting The Refugees of Parga) in exchange for a monetary settlement, and it later passed to full Ottoman rule. This decision was highly unpopular among the population of Parga, a predominantly Greek inhabited and extremely pro-Venetian settlement. Parga then ceased to provide a refuge for Klephts and Souliotes and many residents of Parga moved to nearby Corfu rather than live under Ottoman rule. As such Parga was completely abandoned by its inhabitants after the British departure and its handover to Ali Pasha in 1819. Ali Pasha brought local Albanian speakers from Chameria to repopulate Parga. In 1830, Kutahi, in his attempt to restore rule and justice in the region, invited the people of Parga to return to their homeland.

During the first year of the Greek War of Independence (1821) the Ottoman garrison of Parga was unsuccessfully attacked by a small force of Souliotes and men of the local diaspora. In 1831, some Muslim refugee families from the Peloponnese were resettled in Parga by Kutahi. According to a 1877 report by the Greek vice-consul, in Parga lived 365 Christian and 180 Muslim families. In 1877 the predominant language in Parga was Greek since even the local Muslim element spoke Greek, while some of them also spoke Albanian. In the early 20th century, apart from Albanian speakers, a considerable part of the Parga Muslims were Greek speakers and Romani, many of whom had immigrated to the area from southern Greece after the Greek war of independence in 1821. Ottoman rule in Parga and the rest of Epirus ended in 1913 following the victory of Greece in the Balkan Wars, and the town became part of Greece. As a result of the Population exchange between Greece and Turkey, the state of Greece in November 1924 transported to Turkey, 1,500 Albanian-speaking Muslims from Parga, as not being of Albanian origin. The Muslims of Parga had acquired Ottoman citizenship in 1913, but had later renounced it. On this basis, the Greek government considered them to be Turkish. As a result of protests, a Mixed Commission under the League of Nations with representatives from Greece and Albania was formed. On 2 February 1926, Qenan Mesare, the Albanian representative protested against the forced relocations to Turkey from the region of Chameria, the worsening of the living conditions for the Cham community and specifically referred to the village of Parga, where the majority were transferred to Turkey. In 1927, a group of 20 Muslim families petitioned for their planned exchange to be annulled. This small group was eventually allowed to remain in Parga via mediation by the League of Nations which made their status "non-exchangeable".

During the Axis Occupation of Greece, in August 1943, Parga was targeted by the German anti-guerilla operation named 'Augustus'. The Wehrmacht units were actively assisted by units of the Italian army and armed Cham Albanian groups under Nuri Dino, Mazar Dino and Abdul Qasim resulting in several Greek settlements to being burnt to the ground and the murder of civilian Greek population. On 10 August 1943, the National Republican Greek League (EDES) and the Cham Balli Kombëtar (BK) held a meeting in Parga, attended by representatives of the two organizations including Mazar Dino. EDES asked for the disarmament of the Cham units and for their activity to pass under EDES command. These demands were met with refusal by the Cham BK. After orders by the British Allied Command the EDES undertook operations around the coast of Parga. Control of the region was vital for logistical reasons. On 28 June 1944, EDES took the village and killed 52 Cham Albanians. The following month the left wing National Liberation Front (EAM) arrested 40 local Muslims and executed them. The remaining members of the Muslim community were saved by units of EDES. In general violent incidents in Summer-Autumn 1944 were quite limited and the civilian Muslim community was not found in danger. During the conflicts that resulted in the German retreat, the Axis troops around Parga had the armed support of Cham units. At the end of the war, the remaining Muslim Chams fled to Albania. Albanian is still spoken by few inhabitants in parts of the municipality which includes a much broader area than the immediate vicinity of Parga itself. In the settlements of the Fanari plain, Albanian is still spoken by a few people, while in some settlements like Anthousa and Kanallaki, the closest existing variants of Souliotic Albanian are still spoken by a few people in modern times.

Various cultural and educational foundations in Parga were erected due to bequests by prominent locals, such as Athanasios Deskas. The modern town in general preserves its traditional architectural features.

== Castle of Parga ==
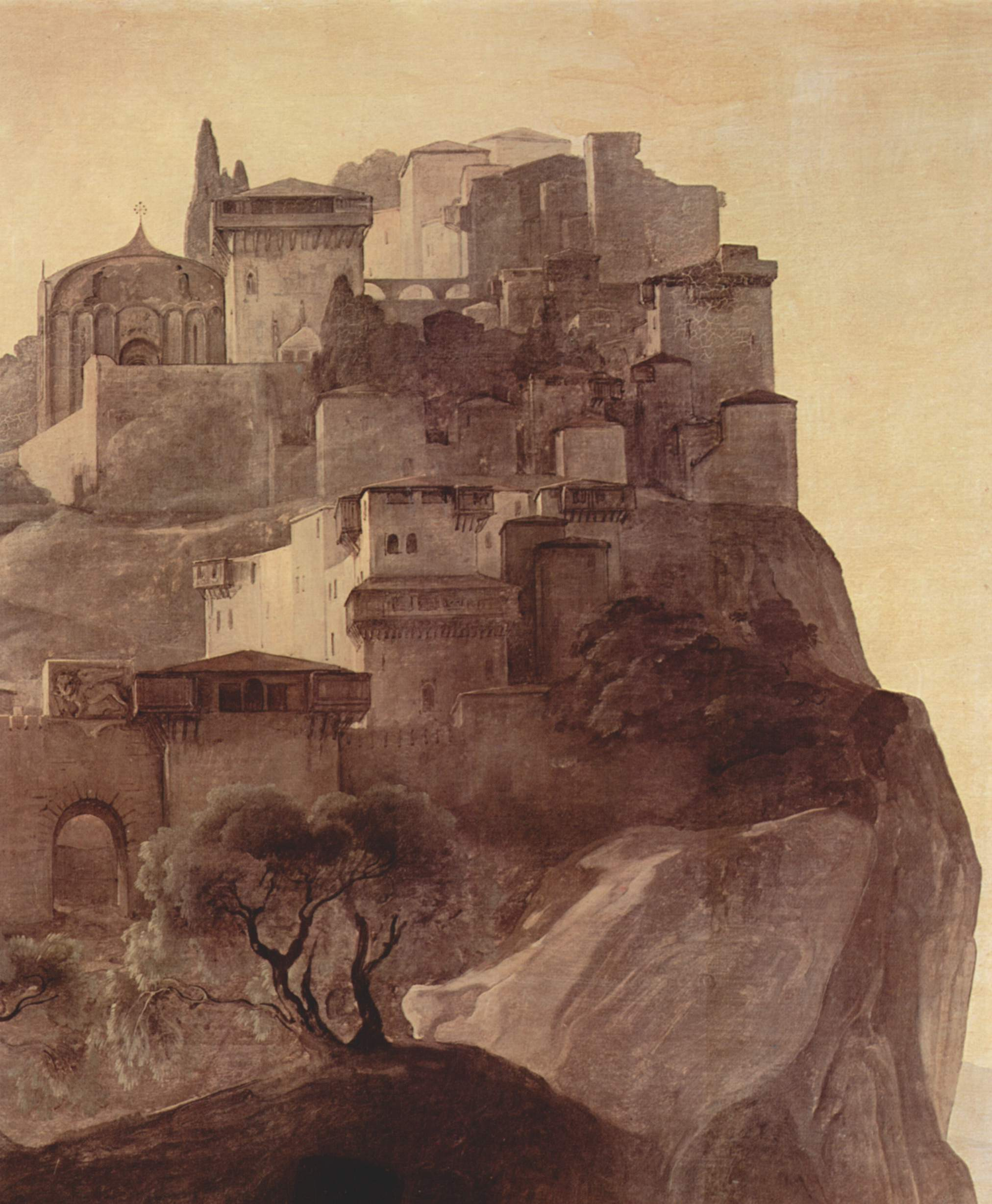
Depiction of the castle from a painting by Francesco Hayez (1791–1882).

The Castle is found on the top of a hill overlooking the town and was used to protect the town from invasions from the mainland and the sea. It was initially built in the 11th century by the residents of Parga to protect their town from pirates and the Ottomans. In the 13th century, as their control of the region increased, the Venetians rebuilt the castle to fortify the area. In 1452, Parga and the castle were occupied by the Ottomans for two years; part of the castle was demolished at that time. In 1537, Ottoman admiral Hayreddin Barbarossa burned and destroyed the fortress and the houses within.

Before the reconstruction of the castle in 1572 by the Venetians, the Turks demolished it once again. The Venetians rebuilt it for the third and last time creating a stronger fortress that stayed impregnable until 1819, despite attacks, especially by Ali Pasha of Ioannina. Provisions for the castle were transported via two bays at Valtos and Pogonia. When Parga was sold to the Ottomans, Ali Pasha made structural additions to the castle, including a hammam (bathhouse) and his harem quarters which he built at the top of the fortress. On the arched gate at the wall of the castle entrance, the winged lion of Agios Markos is visible. Other entrance details include, the name “ANTONIO BERVASS 1764”, emblems of Ali Pasha, two-headed eagles and related inscriptions.

== Geography ==
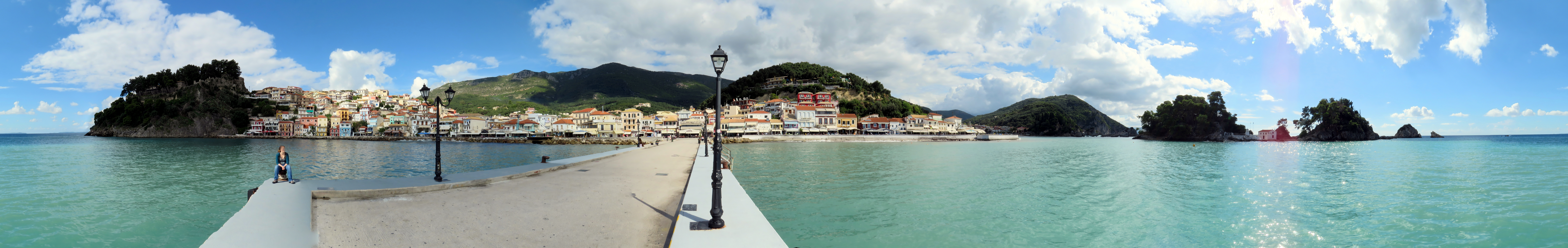
A 360-degree panoramic image of Parga from the pier.

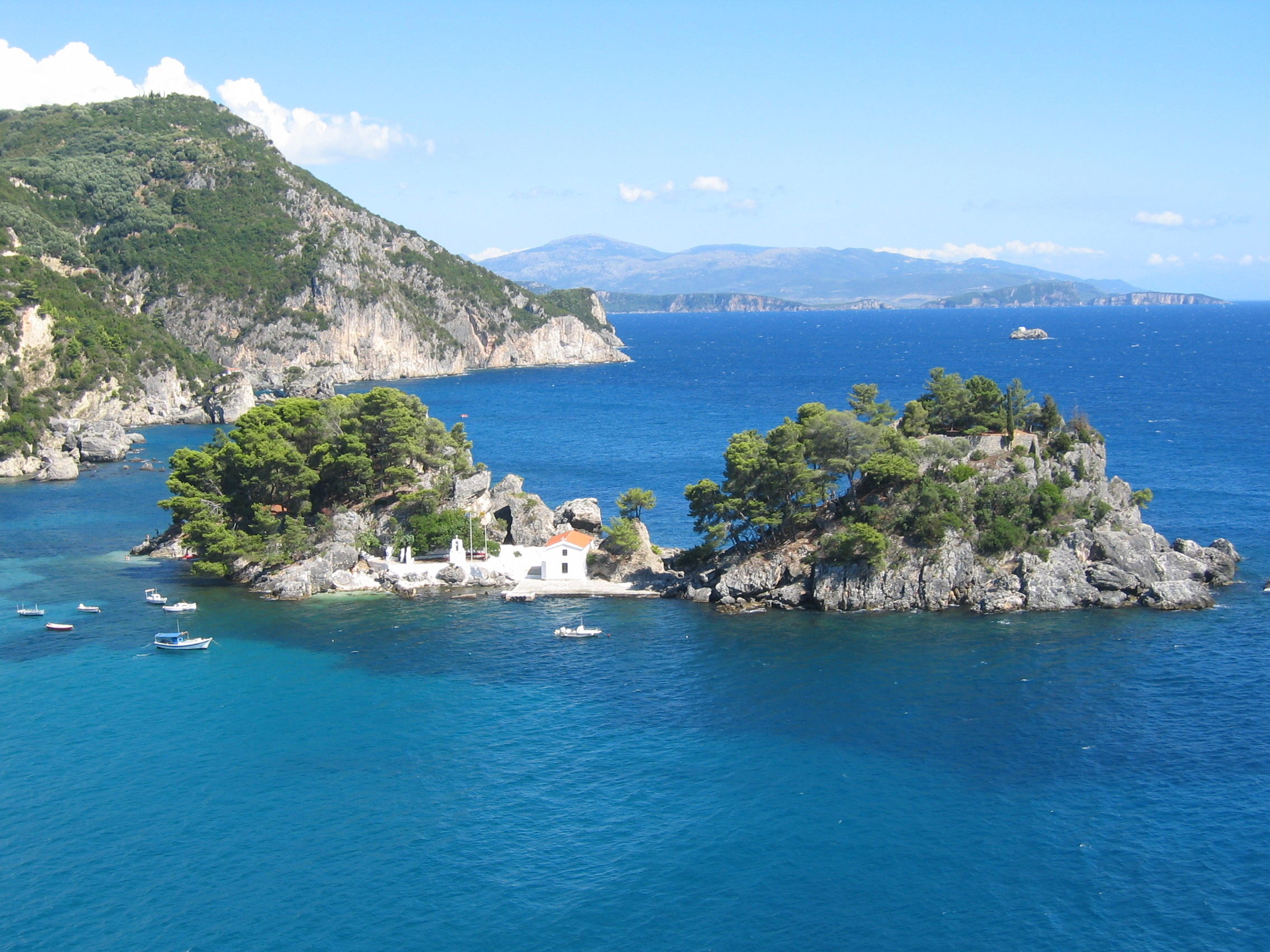
The island of Panagia off the coast of Parga.

The city of Parga, built amphitheatrically, stands between the mountainous coastal region of Preveza and Igoumenitsa. It is known as the "Bride of Epirus". In the summer, tourists arrive from Paxos, Antipaxos, and Corfu by boat.

=== Beaches ===
Parga attracts thousands of tourists. In its vicinity there are beaches including Valtos, Kryoneri, Piso Kryoneri, Lichnos, Sarakiniko and Ai Giannaki.

==== Valtos Beach ====
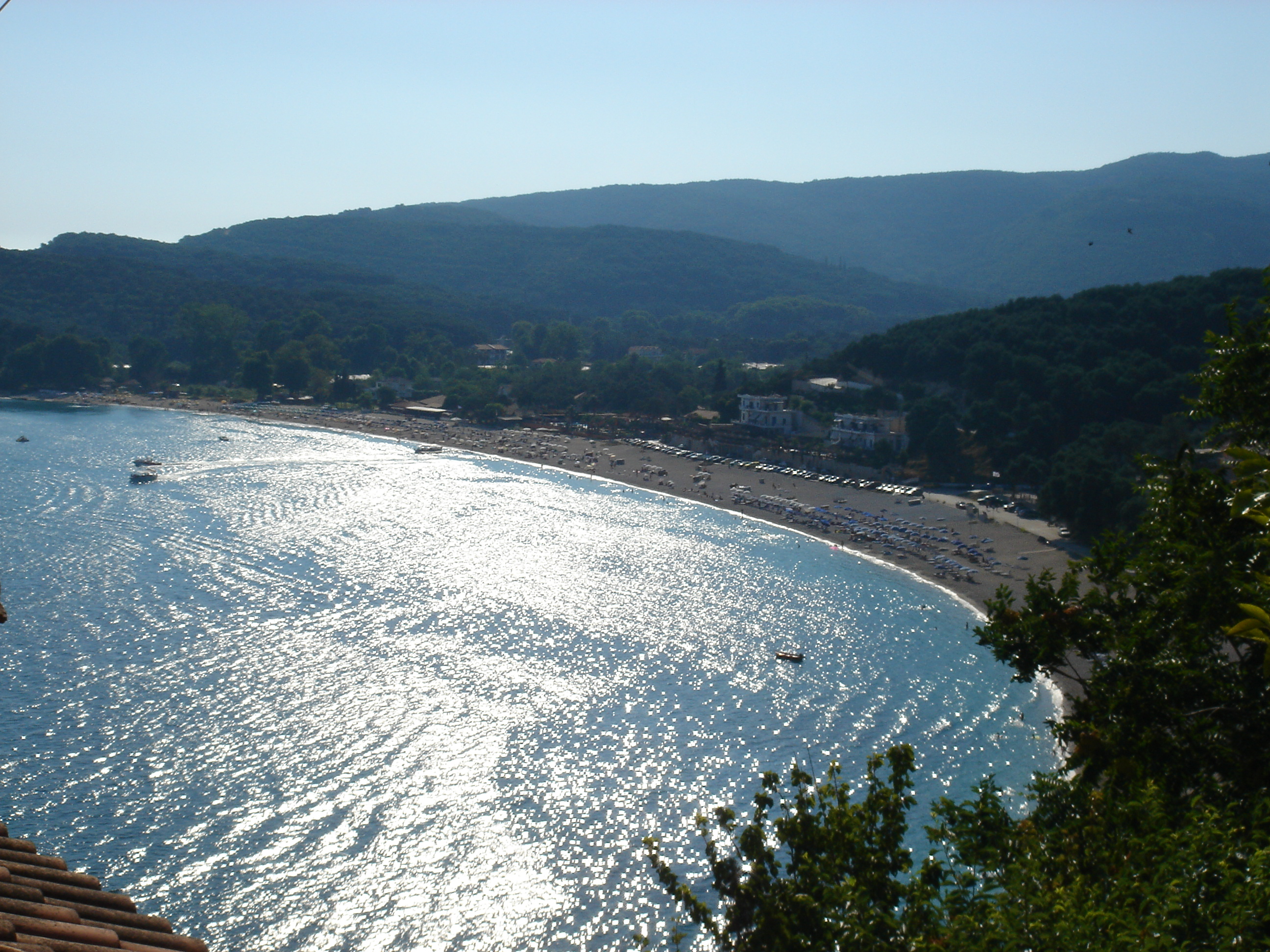
Panoramic view of Valtos beach

Valtos Beach is one of the longest beaches of Parga. It is located near the castle of Parga. Because of its clear waters and proximity to the town it attracts many tourists. Kastro Point, which is located in the same beach, is popular among surfers due to its excellent surfing conditions. However, the level of skill required is high and the spot is best suited to more advanced surfers.

==== Krioneri Beach ====
Krioneri Beach, the main beach of Parga, lies a short distance from the town centre. The small island of Virgin Mary is situated across the bay.

==== Lichnos Beach ====
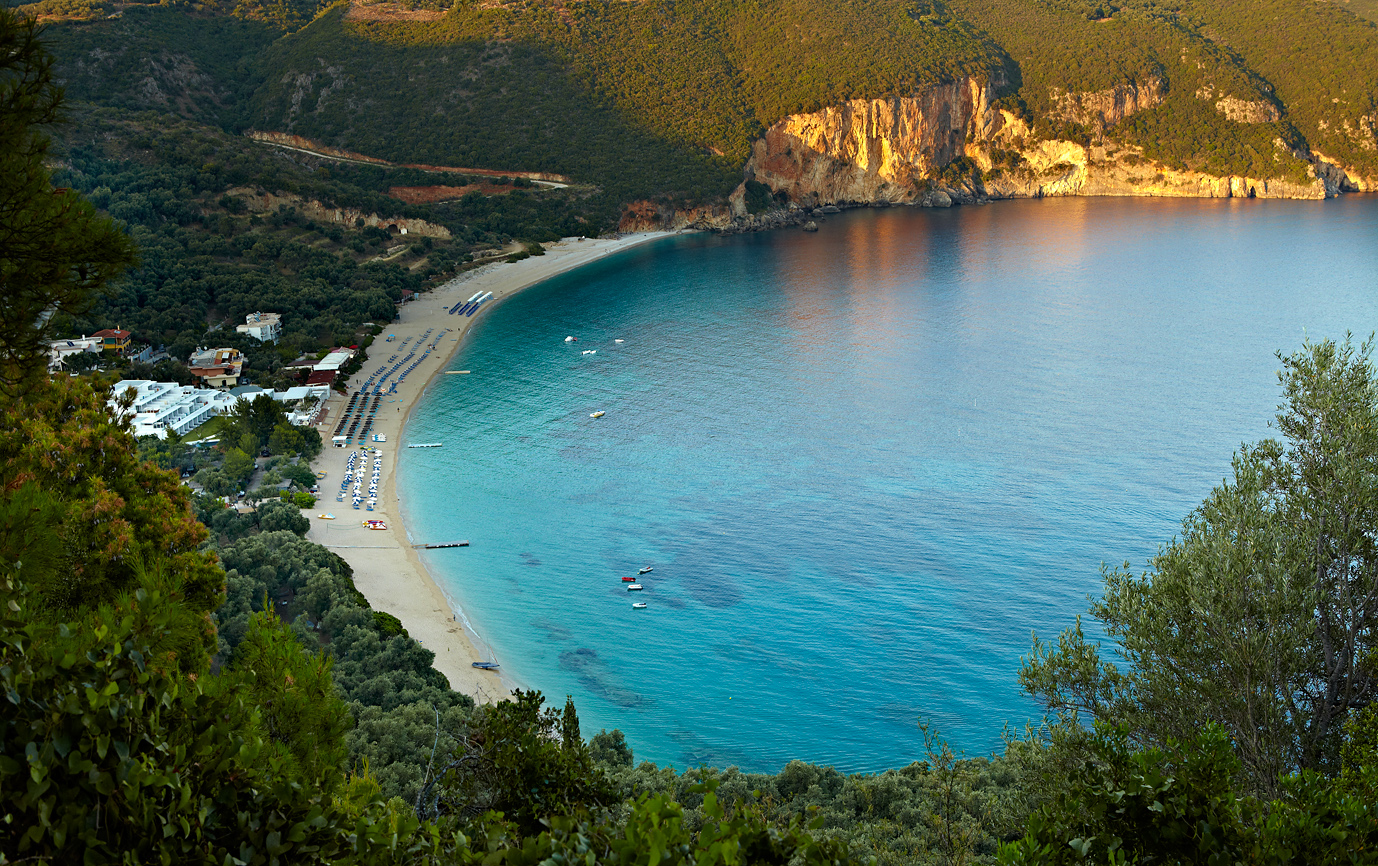
Parga Lichnos beach

Lichnos Beach, one of the beaches of Parga, is located in western Greece 3 km from Parga and Spread in the area of 2 hectares.

==== Agios Sostis beach ====
Agios Sostis is a small beach on the northwest side of Anthoussa village. A small church, built in the 14th century, stands nearby.

==== Sarakiniko beach ====
Sarakiniko is a well-known beach, located on the west side of Agia village, near a small river and olive trees, approximately 12 km from the town centre. Small boats connect the beach with the port of Parga.

=== Climate ===
Parga experiences a hot-summer mediterranean climate (Köppen Csa). Precipitation falls mainly in the winter months, with little in the summer. The town experiences mild winters and hot, dry summers. The average annual temperature is 16.5 °C or 61.8 °F, with about 1219 mm or 48.0 inches of precipitation annually.

== Transport ==
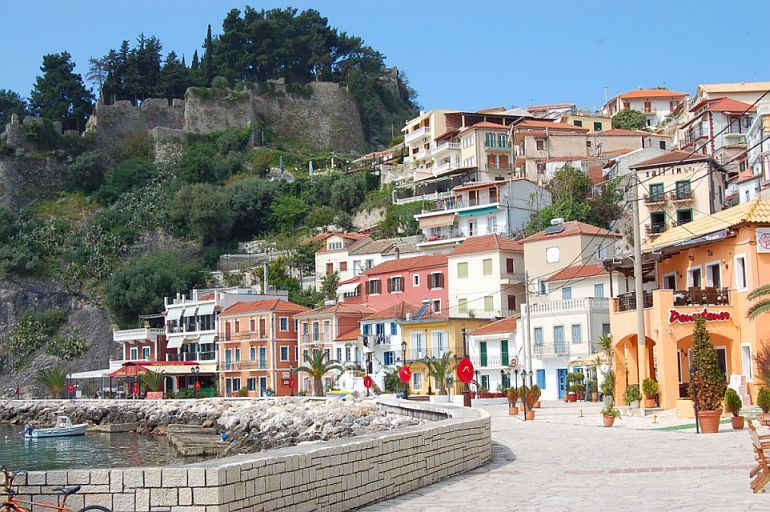
Traditional houses

The town of Parga is linked with direct suburban buses (KTEL) to other Greek cities and towns such as Igoumenitsa and Preveza. There are also indirect connections with Athens, Thessaloniki and Ioannina

Tourists arriving in Parga fly in from Aktio (65 km) with seasonal direct flights connecting Parga with Athens, Thessaloniki and other domestic and international destinations. Tourists also arrive via the Ioannina and Corfu airports.

Parga is located 10 km from national road and 34 km from national motorway.

== Municipal districts ==
- Agia (Agia, Sarakiniko)
- Anthousa (Anthousa, Trikorfo)
- Livadari (Livadari, Vryses)
- Parga (Parga, Agia Kyriaki, Agios Georgios, Maras, Chrysogiali)

== Historical population ==
Year	Town	Municipal unit	Municipality
1981	1,892	-	-
1991	1,699	3,569	-
2001	2,432	4,033	-
2011	2,415	3,904	11,866
2021	2,489	3,819	10,762

== Notable people ==
- Pargalı Ibrahim Pasha (1493–1536), a grand vizier in the Ottoman Empire
- Andreas Idromenos (1764–1843), scholar
- Panagiotis Aravantinos (1811–1870), historian and scholar
- Ioannis Dimoulitsas, fighter of the Greek War of Independence
- Tus (1986–present), Greek rapper

== See also ==
- List of settlements in the Preveza regional unit

== Sources ==
- Balta, Evangelia; Oğuz, Mustafa; Yaşar, Filiz (2011). "Εthnic and Religious Composition of Ottoman Thesprotia in the 15th to 17th centuries". In Forsén, Björn; Tikkala, Esko (eds.). Thesprotia Expedition II. Environment and Settlement Patterns. Foundation of the Finnish Institute at Athens. ISBN 978-952-67211-2-5.
- Isufi, Hajredin (2002). Musa Demi dhe qëndresa çame: 1800-1947. Botime Dudaj. ISBN 9992750103.
- Ψιμούλη, Βάσω Δ. (2006). Σούλι και Σουλιώτες. Ιστορία και Πολιτική (4th ed.). Athens: Βιβλιοπωλείον της Εστίας.
  - Psimuli, Vaso Dh. (2016). Suli dhe suljotët [Souli and the Souliots]. Toena. ISBN 9789928205728.
- Osswald, Brendan (2007). "The Ethnic Composition of Medieval Epirus". In Ellis, Steven G.; Klusáková, Lud'a (eds.). Imagining Frontiers, Contesting Identities. Pisa: Edizioni Plus – Pisa University Press. ISBN 978-88-8492-466-7.
- Osswald, Brendan (2011). L'Epire du treizième au quinzième siècle : autonomie et hétérogénéité d'une région balkanique (Thesis). Université Toulouse le Mirail - Toulouse II.
