= The Refugees of Parga =

Painting by Francesco Hayez

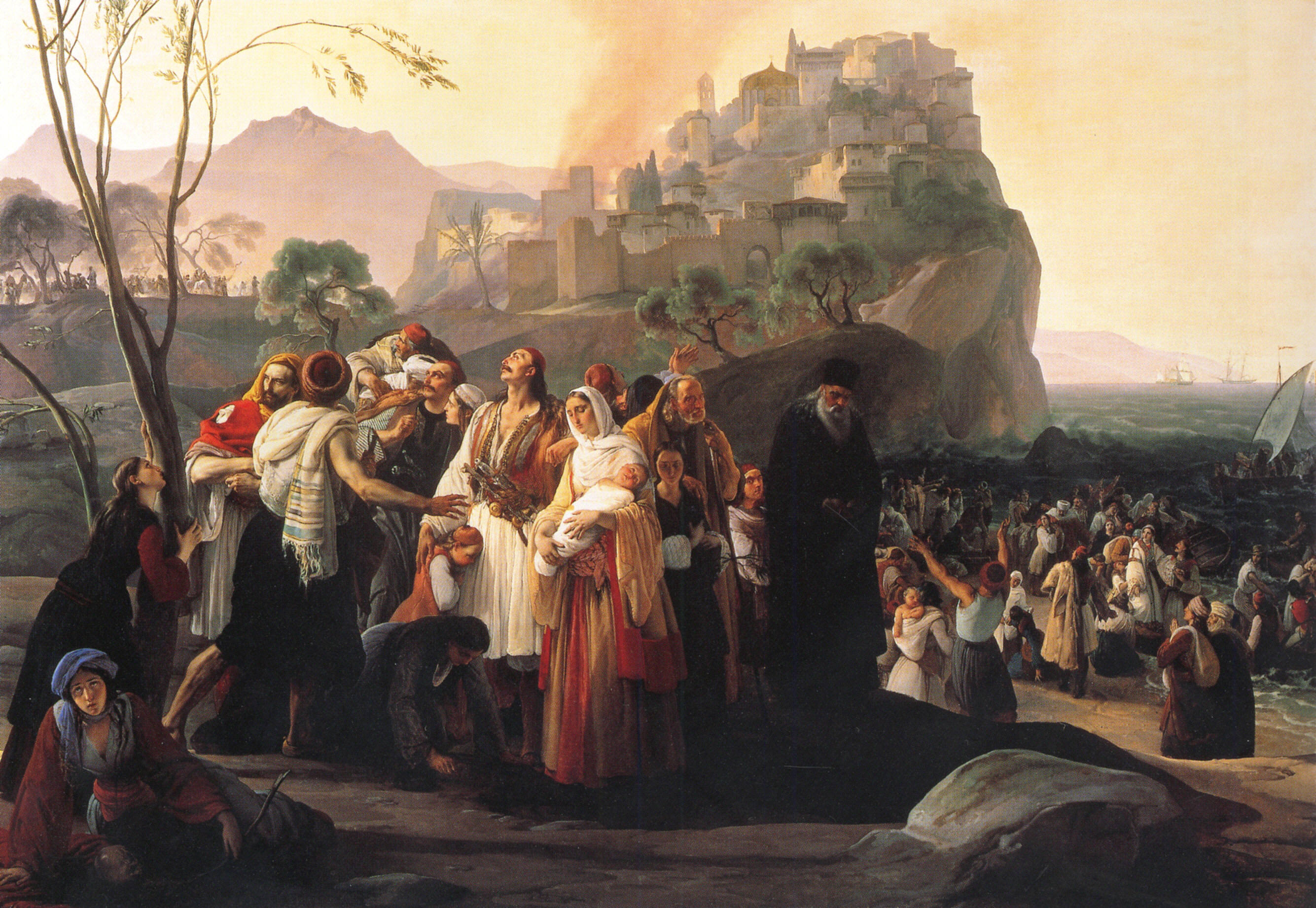
The Refugees of Parga (1831) by Francesco Hayez

The Refugees of Parga is an 1831 oil-on-canvas painting by the Italian artist Francesco Hayez, now in the Pinacoteca Tosio Martinengo in Brescia. It shows Greek refugees fleeing Parga after the British sold it to the Ottoman Empire in 1819.
