= Kanallaki =

Kanallaki Καναλλάκι
- Community
- Location within Greece
- Coordinates: 39°14′N 20°36′E
- Country: Greece
- Administrative region: Epirus
- Regional unit: Preveza
- Municipality: Parga
- Municipal unit: Fanari

Population (2021)
  - Community: 2,542
- Time zone: UTC+2 (EET)
  - Summer (DST): UTC+3 (EEST)

Kanallaki (Greek: Καναλλάκι, romanized: Kanalláki, Albanian: Kanallaqi) is a settlement in the regional unit of Preveza, Epirus in northwestern Greece. It belongs to the municipality of Parga and is simultaneous the seat of it. The number of inhabitants of the town amounts to 2,542 (2021).

== History ==
Kanallaki was one of the Christian Orthodox Albanian-speaking villages which either due to the absence of Greek or for reasons of demographic importance, would see Greek education expanded, through measures such as the establishment of kindergartens.

From 29 July – 31 August 1943, a joint Nazi German-Cham Albanian armed operation was launched. As a result in 21 settlements in the vicinity of Kanallaki 400 inhabitants were arrested and forced to march to the nearest concentration camp in Thessaloniki (KZ Pavlos Melas). When the march begun the armed groups did not hesitate to execute a diseased priest in front of the rest of the hostages.

In Kanalaki and also Anthousa (Albanian: Rapëza), the closest existing variants of Souliotic Albanian are spoken. This dialect is spoken only by few people in modern times.

== Sources ==
- Ψιμούλη, Βάσω Δ. (2006). Σούλι και Σουλιώτες. Ιστορία και Πολιτική (4th ed.). Athens: Βιβλιοπωλείον της Εστίας.
  - Psimuli, Vaso Dh. (2016). Suli dhe suljotët [Souli and the Souliots]. Toena. ISBN 9789928205728.
