= Albanian American Organization Chameria =

Note: This page is about the organization established in the United States, for the other Cham Albanian association, with center in Albania, see National Political Association "Çamëria"

Albanian American Organization Chameria (A.A.O.C) (Albanian: Organizata Shqiptaro-Amerikane Çamëria) is a Non Governmental Organization, based in Chicago, Illinois, United States, which works and conducts research for the rights of and the issues of Cham Albanians who are American citizens.

== Chams in USA ==
After the occupation of Ioannina in 1913 and due to the heavy pressures from the Agrarian Reforms in the 1920s imposed, many Cham Albanians left Chameria after the occupation of Epirus. They were also subsequently expelled from Greece beginning in 1944 and ending in Spring of 1945, by forcefully being sent to Albania. Additionally, many Chams were persecuted by the Albanian Communist regime as well. forcing them to leave. The majority of Cham Albanians that left Albania and Greece, migrated to the United States. The first wave of Cham immigrants were mainly concentrated in Hartford, CT, where they created the Chameria Society, Chicago, as well as Boston and New York City. They managed to retain their tradition and language, and published the first Cham Albanian newspaper, in 1966, named "Chameria - motherland" (Albanian: Çamëria - Vatra amtare), edited by Bilal Xhaferri.

Cham Albanians in the United States are the fourth most numerous population of Chams, after Albania, Turkey and Greece, Since the Cham League was founded in the early 1970s.

== See also ==
- Chameria
- Cham Albanians
- Chameria Issue
- National Political Association "Çamëria"
