= National Political Association "Çamëria" =

Annual Cham Protest on 27 June 2008 in Konispol, Albania

The National Political Association "Çamëria" (in Albanian: Shoqëria Politike Atdhetare "Çamëria"), a pressure group advocating the return of the Chams to Greece, receipt of compensation and greater freedom for the Orthodox Chams in Greece, was founded on 10 January 1991.

This association holds a number of activities every year, with the help of the Party for Justice and Integration, as well as other organizations. Every year, on 27 June, is organized in Konispol the Cham March, remembering the expulsions of Cham Albanians.

== History ==
In March 1991, the first national conference of the Chameria Political Association (CPA) was held in Tirana with many of its activists drawn from the Albanian community who had been expelled from Greece after the war. The CPA intended to bring to international attention the neglected linguistic, cultural, and educational rights of Eastern Orthodox Cham Albanians who have been subjected to a Greek policy of assimilation. The group has also launched campaigns on behalf of Cham exiles in Albania. It has encouraged the expansion of contacts with compatriots in Greece, the return of exiles to their family areas, and the payment of compensation for property and land that was illegally taken from them during their expulsion.

== Activities ==
Since 1991, Albanian activists across the political spectrum have become more outspoken on the Chameria issue vis-à-vis Greece. Historic grievances over Greek repression of Eastern Orthodox and Muslim Albanians earlier this century have been aired, and Athens has been criticized for its ongoing assimilationist pressures against Orthodox Albanians who still reside in the Chameria, Epirus region. Although the Greek authorities have denied that any Cham problem exists, Cham representatives have continued to urge the Albanian government to take up the issue with Athens at the highest bilateral levels.

== Controversy ==
Ancient Greek king Pyrrhus, as logo of the association

Leaders within the organisation have presented to the public, the ancient Greek King Pyrrhus of Epirus (4th-3rd century BC) as a representative figurehead and hero of ancient Albanian history and attempted to link him with Skanderbeg, a medieval figure that fought the Ottomans.

== See also ==
- Chameria
- Cham Albanians
- Chameria Issue
- Party for Justice and Integration
- Albanian American Organization Chameria
