= Agia, Preveza =

Agia Αγιά
- Community
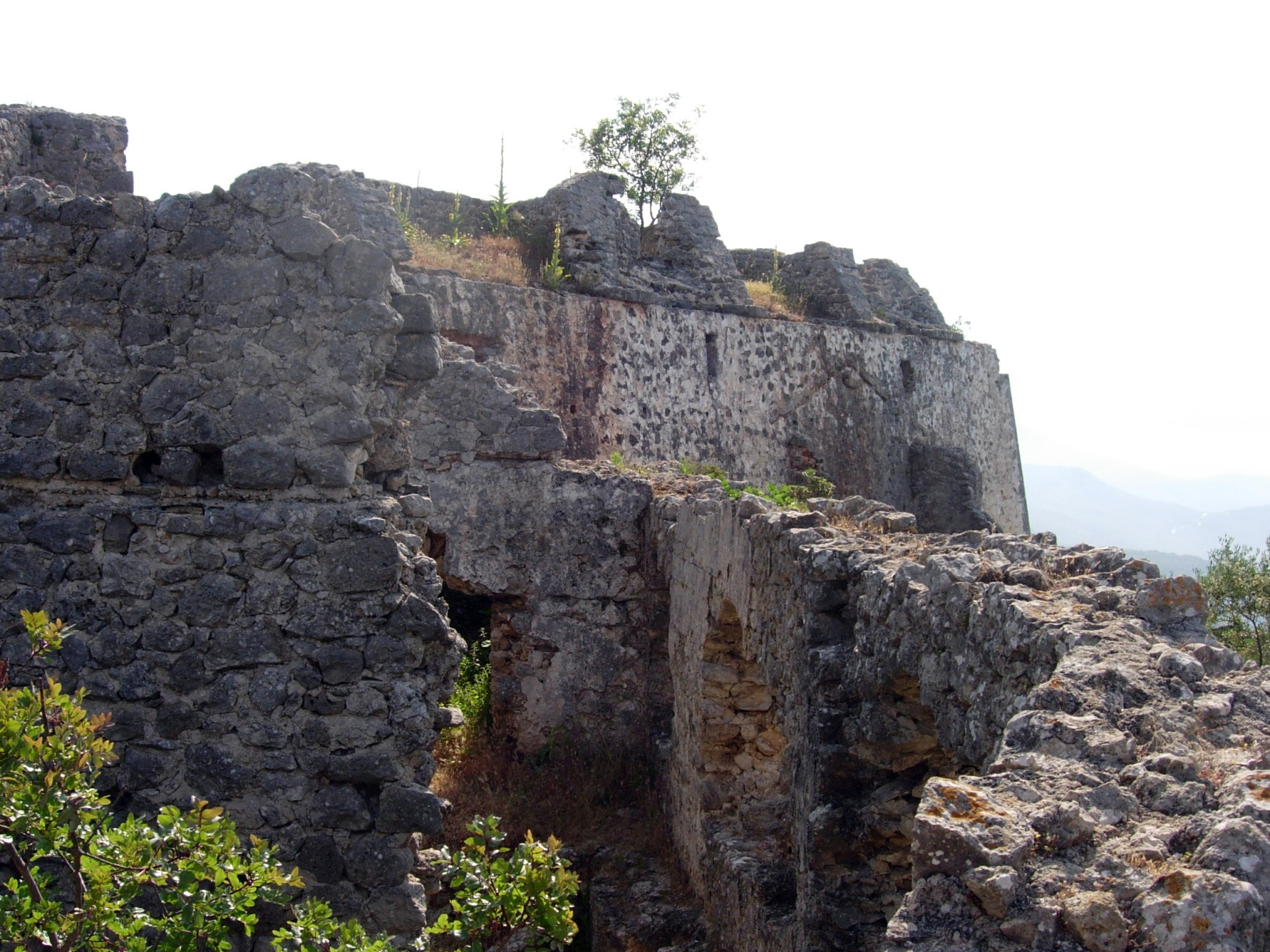
- Castle of Ali Pasha, dating back to the 19th century

- Location within Greece
- Coordinates: 39°18′N 20°21′E
- Country: Greece
- Administrative region: Epirus
- Regional unit: Preveza
- Municipality: Parga
- Municipal unit: Parga

Population (2021)
  - Community: 622
- Time zone: UTC+2 (EET)
  - Summer (DST): UTC+3 (EEST)

Agia (Greek: Αγιά) is a village in the municipality of Parga in Epirus, Greece. In addition to the settlement of Sarakiniko, it forms the local community of Agia.

A few hundred years ago, the actual settlement of Agia was located on the bay where Sarakiniko lies today. Since these always fell into the hands of pirates, Agia was rebuilt in that place where the village is today. This proves also the name of the town of Margariti, which is thought to come from the Pirate Margaritus of Brindisi. Not so far away lies the Castle of Ali Pasha of Ioannina, who ruled over large parts of today's northern Greece.

In 1814 Agia was plundered by units of the Ottoman Albanian ruler Ali Pasha and the local inhabitants fled to nearby Parga.

Agia was one of the Albanian Orthodox villages which either due to the absence of Greek or for reasons of demographic importance, would see Greek education expanded, through measures such as the establishment of kindergartens. In the 1970s, the village was still home to a few monolingual speakers of Albanian.

The community counts 622 inhabitants (2021).
