= Chameria =

Historical region

Chameria Çamëria (Albanian) Τσαμουριά (Greek)
- Historical region
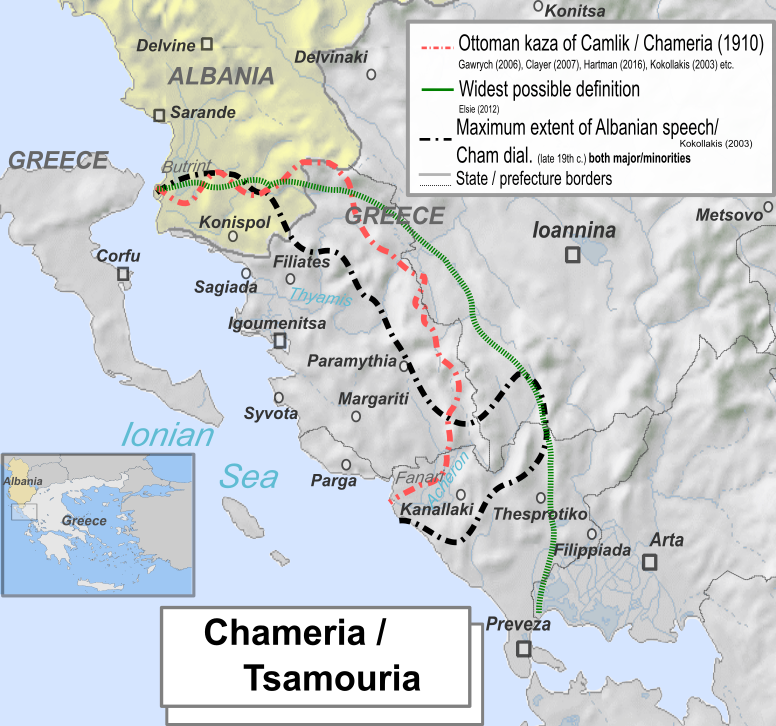
- Approximate geographical outline of Chameria according to various views. In red, the Ottoman kaza of Çamlık. In black, the maximum extent of Albanian speech. In green, the more expansive version of the region's definition by R. Elsie.
- Country: Greece, Albania (present-day)

Chameria (also spelled Çameria; Albanian: Çamëria; Greek: Τσαμουριά, romanized: Tsamouriá) is a historical region along the coast of the Ionian Sea in southwestern Albania and northwestern Greece, traditionally associated with the Albanian ethnic subgroup of the Chams. For a brief period (1909-1912), three kazas (Filat, Aydonat and Margiliç) were combined by the Ottomans into an administrative district called Çamlik sancak. During the interwar period, the toponym was in common use and the official name of the area above the Acheron river in all Greek state documents. The term is used today mostly by Albanians and it is obsolete in Greek, surviving in some old folk songs. Most of what is called Chameria is divided between parts of the Greek regional units of Thesprotia, Preveza, and Ioannina (some villages at the western side); and the municipality of Konispol at the southernmost extremity of Albania. Apart from geographic and ethnographic usages, in contemporary times within Albania the toponym has also acquired irredentist connotations.

== Name and definition ==
=== Name ===
In the Middle Ages this area was known as Vagenetia.

Chameria was mostly used as a term for the region of modern Thesprotia, during the Ottoman rule. It is of uncertain etymology. It possibly derives from the ancient Greek name of the Thyamis river, called Cham (Çam) in Albanian, either through the unattested Slavic *čamь or *čama rendering the older Slavic *tjama, or a direct continuation from it.

In European travel reports, the term appears for the first time at the beginning of the 19th century. The term was not used in Ottoman territorial administration before the 20th century.

=== Geography and boundaries ===
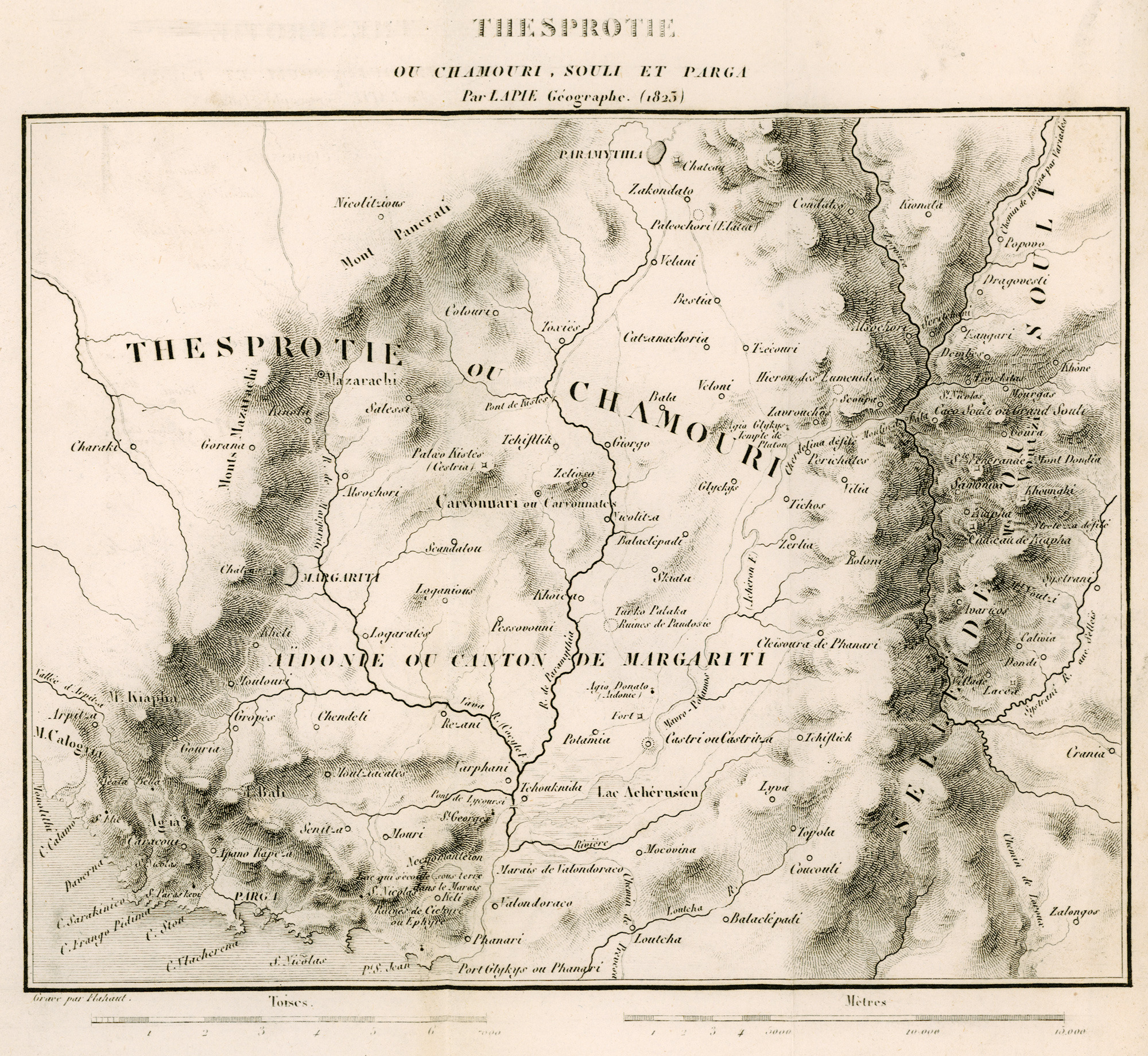
Map of Thesprotia or Chamouri, Souli and Parga, by F. Pouqueville (1826)

In modern times, the region of Chameria was reduced to the dialectological territory of the Chams, stretching between the mouth of the Acheron river in the south, the area of Butrint in the north, and the Pindus in the east. After the permanent demarcation of the Greco-Albanian border, only two small municipalities were left in southern Albania (Markat and Konispol), while the remainder was part of the Epirus periphery of Greece.

The early 19th c. Greek author Perraivos, notable for his works on Souli and Epirus, notes that the Albanian Chams inhabit the area between the Bistrica river in the north and the Souli area south. French diplomat and General Consul of France in nearby Ioannina, François Pouqueville, noticed in 1814-1816 that there is a district named Chamouri that stretches from the Thyamis all the way down to the Acheron river. In the early 1800s British colonel William Martin Leake while in the area described Chameria as stretching from the boundaries of Butrint and Delvinë until the Fanari and Paramythia areas consisting of two main sub-districts, Daghawi or Dai and Parakalamos. During the 19th century, the novelista and poet Nikolaos Konemenos, an Arvanite from the area placed his home district of Lakka (Λάκκας) within the bounds of Tsamouria (Τσαμουριά) or Chameria. In the early 1880s, British diplomat Valentine Chirol who spent time in the area during the Eastern Crisis defined Chameria along linguistic lines in geographic terms where Albanian speakers were found during that time. Chirol states that the Thiamis river basin, the Souli mountains, the Louros river valley up until the Preveza peninsula formed part of the district called "Tchamouria" which referred to the "southernmost Albanian settlements in Epirus". Chirol also noted that due to the spread of the Chams in the area, the toponym also applied to the centre of the region where they held "undivided sway".

Within the confines of the Ottoman administrative system (1880s) Albanians of the time claimed that Toskland (Turkish: Toskalık) was made up of three components Toskalık, Laplık and Çamlık. According to the Ottoman administration of 1880s Çamlık or Chamland (Chameria) consisted of the regions Margalic, Aydonat and Filat. As such those three kazas where also known as kaza of Chameria. Similarly in 1910 the kaza of Resadiye was created, also known as kaza of Chameria or Igoumenitsa and included the former kazas of Paramythia, Margariti and Filiates. On the other hand, Sami Frashëri, a noted member of the Albanian national movement and Ottoman intellectual who compiled the first Ottoman dictionary Kamus al-a'lam (Universal Dictionary of History and Geography) wrote in various article entries pertaining to the region and claimed that Chameria included: Ioannina, Konitsa, Louros, Parga, Margariti, Filiates, Preveza. Thus claiming that Chameria was a much larger region and coincided with the southern part of Epirus.

During the interwar period of the twentieth century British historian Nicholas Hammond traversed the region and described Chameria as consisting of main settlements like Paramythia and Margariti. He also described the Chameria region as pertaining to the Thiamis river basin, covering the Margariti district and heading all the way down to coastal villages like Loutsa of the Acheron plain, which marked the most southernmost Albanian speaking settlement and the southern limit of Chameria. Pre-War Greek sources say that the coast of Chameria extended from the Acheron River to Butrint and the inland reaches east till the slopes of Mount Olytsikas (or Tomaros). The center of Chameria was considered to be Paramythia and other areas were Filiates, Parga and Margariti. In various Greek sources of the interwar era they also at times include the Greek speaking area to the east of Filiates within Chameria, while excluding the Albanian speaking area of Fanari known also as Prevezaniko. Throughout the interwar period, Chameria in official Greek government documents related to the area north of the Acheron river.

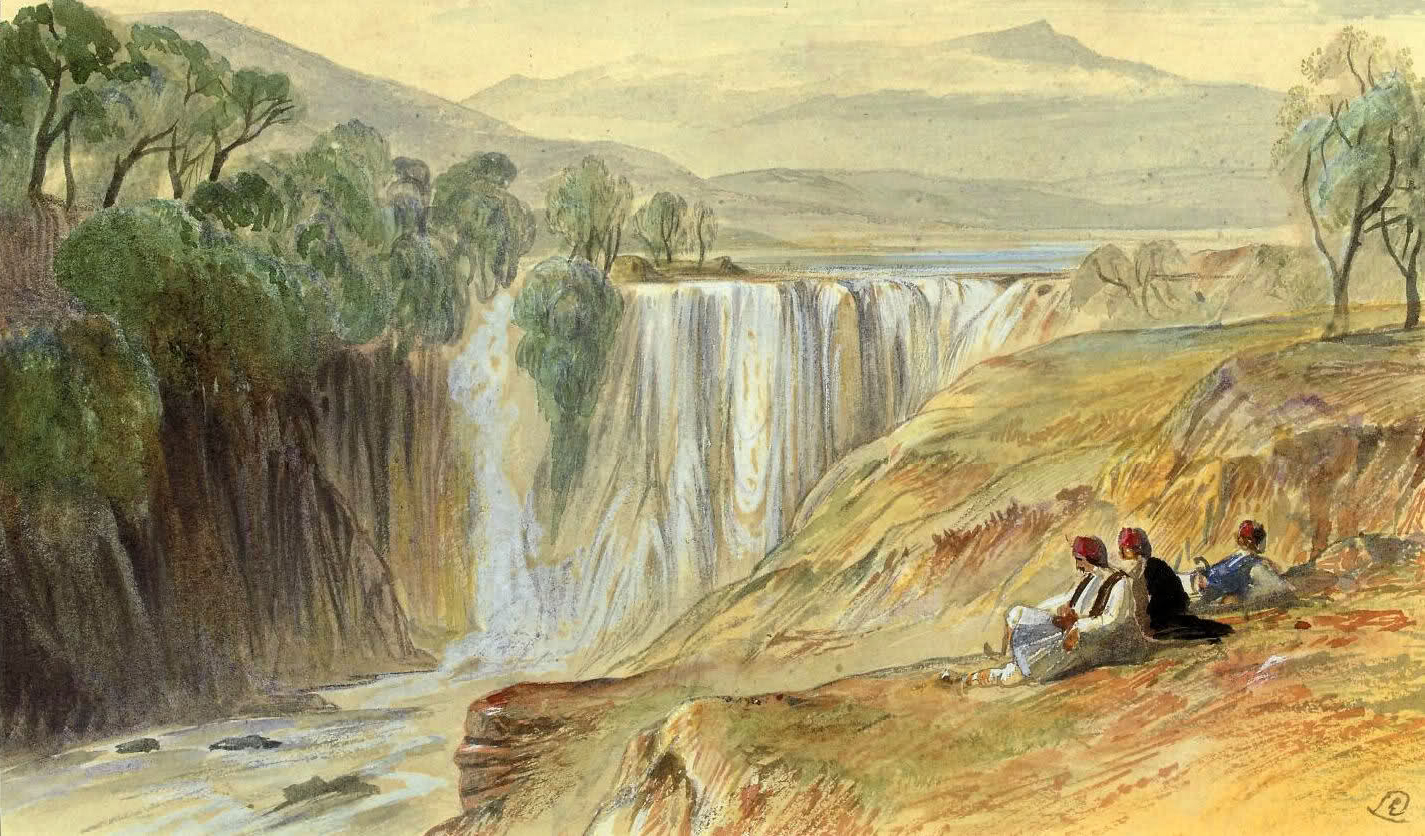
The falls of the Thyamis by Edward Lear, 1851. Pencil and watercolour on paper, 16.50 × 26.00 cm.

Modern day scholarship gives descriptions of the geographical outlines or areas of Chameria. Professors of History, Eleftheria Manta, Kyriakos Kentriotis and Dimitris Michalooulos agree that Chameria extends from the Acheron River to Butrint and the inland reaches east till the slopes of Mount Olytsikas. This region, besides a small part that belongs to the Albanian state is more or less equated with Thesprotia. Leonidas Kallivretakis states that the Greek part of the Chameria region is limited to Thesprotia prefecture, both in Ottoman and modern times. Similarly, historian Georgia Kretsi states that Chameria concerns the same region which is today called Thesprotia among Greeks, in addition to a small number of settlements on the Albanian side of the border. Lambros Baltsiotis states that it includes a small part of Albanian territory, consisted of the western part of Thesprotia prefecture and north of Preveza regional unit (former Preveza prefecture), stretching down to Fanari. German historian Hermann Frank Meyer states that the modern Thesprotia prefecture geographically coincides with Chameria. Laurie Kain Hart states that Chameria as a district extends to "Epiros at least as far south as Preveza". Historian Konstantinos Tsitselikis states that Chameria is part of Margariti, Igoumenitsa, Filiates and Paramythia regions. Historian Sherif Delvina states that the southernmost limit of Chameria is the Acheron river.

James Pettifer and Miranda Vickers state that Chameria reaches out from the Ionian coast going to the eastern Ioannina mountains and extending to the south going as near as the Preveza gulf. However, in another work Miranda Vickers states that it "extends from Butrint and the mouth of the Acheron River", but at the same time also from "Lake Prespa in the north, eastward to the Pindus mountains and south as far as Preveza and the Gulf of Arta". Robert Elsie states that Chameria corresponds to Thesprotia and Preveza prefectures and including a small area around Konispol town in Albania. Elsie describes Chameria as containing the river basins of the Thiamis and Acheron rivers and Ionian coastline all the way down to Preveza while excluding Corfu island, the Epirote interior and the city of Ioannina. In the same work Elsie states that Thesprotia is the Greek toponymic equivalent for the Albanian toponym Chameria.

== History ==
=== Late Middle Ages ===
The earliest mention of Albanians within the region of Epirus is recorded in a Venetian document of 1210 as inhabiting the area opposite the island of Corfu, however any pre-14th century Albanian migration in the region can not be confirmed. The first documented appearance of Albanians which occurred in sizable numbers within the Despotate of Epirus is not recorded before 1337 in which Byzantine sources present them as nomads.

In the 1340s, taking advantage of a Byzantine civil war, the Serbian King Stefan Uroš IV Dušan conquered Epirus and incorporated it in his Serbian Empire. During this time, two Albanian states were formed in the region. In the summer of 1358, Nikephoros II Orsini, the last despot of Epirus of the Orsini dynasty, was defeated in battle against Albanian chieftains. After acquiring the sympathy of Symeon Uroš Palaiogolos, these chieftains established two new states in the region, the Despotate of Arta and Principality of Gjirokastër. Internal dissension and successive conflicts with their neighbours, including the rising power of the Ottoman Turks, led to the downfall of these Albanian principalities to the Tocco family. The Tocco in turn gradually gave way to the Ottomans, who took Ioannina in 1430, Arta in 1449, Angelokastron in 1460, and finally Vonitsa in 1479.

=== Ottoman rule ===
During the Ottoman rule, the region was under the Vilayet of Ioannina, and later under the Pashalik of Yanina. During this time, the region was known as Chameria (also spelled Tsamouria, Tzamouria) and became a district in the Vilayet of Yanina. The wars of the eighteenth and early nineteenth centuries between Russia and the Ottoman Empire negatively impacted upon the region. Increased conversions to Islam followed, often forced, such as those of 25 villages in 1739 which are located in current day Thesprotia prefecture.

In the 18th century, as the power of the Ottomans declined, the region came under the semi-independent state of Ali Pasha Tepelena, an Albanian brigand who became the provincial governor of Ioannina in 1788. Ali Pasha started campaigns to subjugate the confederation of the Souli settlements in this region. His forces met fierce resistance by the Souliote warriors. After numerous failed attempts to defeat the Souliotes, his troops succeeded in conquering the area in 1803.

After the fall of the Pashalik, the region remained under the control of the Ottoman Empire, while Greece and Albania declared that their goal was to include in their states the whole region of Epirus, including Thesprotia or Chameria. With the rise of the Albanian national movement in the late 19th century, the local Orthodox Albanian speaking population did not share the national ideas of their Muslim Albanian speaking neighbours. Instead they remained Greek-oriented and identified themselves as Greeks. In 1909, the Ottoman Empire combined the kazas (sub districts) of Filat, Aydonat, Margiliç and the town of Parga into a new administrative unit called Çamlak sancak (district), part of Yanya Vilayet (province). Finally, following the Balkan Wars, Epirus was divided in 1913, in the London Peace Conference, and the region came under the control of Kingdom of Greece, with only a small portion being integrated into the newly formed State of Albania.

During the Ottoman era, Chameria had a feudal system of administration. The most important and older feudal clan was that of Pronjo of Paramythia (Drandakis).

=== Modern history ===
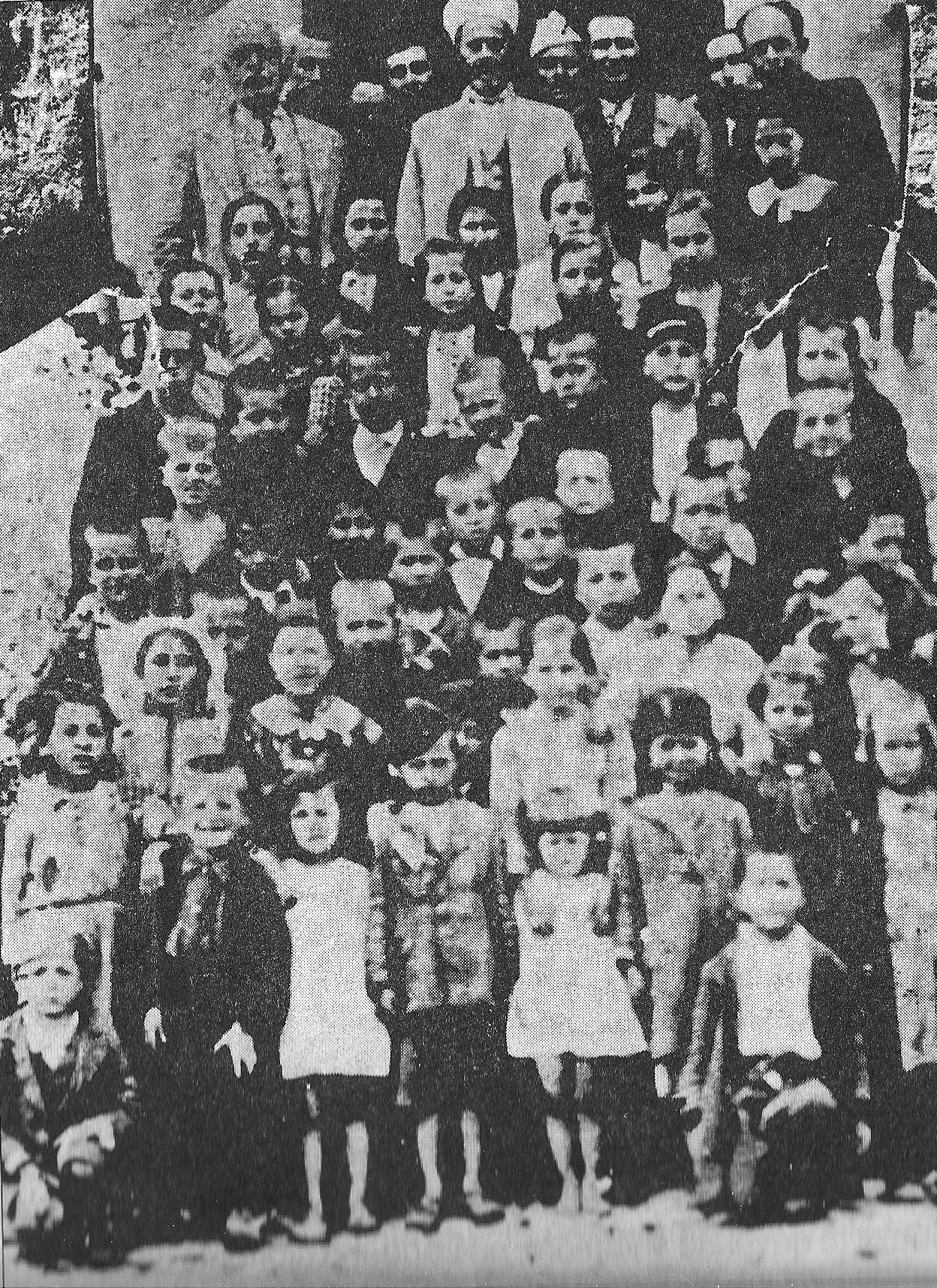
Albanian school of Filiates in 1942–44

When the region came under Greek control after the London Conference of 1912-1913, its population included Greeks, Albanians, Aromanians and Romani.

The Greek census counted Muslim Chams separately from their Christian counterparts; as a result of the religious classification system in place in Greece, some of the Muslim Chams were placed alongside Muslim Turks living in Greece and were transferred to Turkey during the 1923 population exchange between Greece and Turkey while their property was expropriated by the Greek government as part of the same agreement. Orthodox Cham Albanians were counted as Greeks, and their language and Albanian heritage were under heavy pressure of assimilation. The region was then temporarily settled by Greek refugees from Asia Minor who were used as a demographic tool to pressure Muslim Chams to leave the area; most of these Greeks were later moved to other areas in the country after Greece decided not to send Muslim Albanian Chams en-masse to Turkey in the 1920s.

In the 1930s the population of the region was approximately 70,000; Albanian-speaking Muslims were estimated to number around 18,000–20,000. All the population, independently of religion of ethnicity, were called Chams, but were not counted as such on the Greek census. (According to the 1928 census the total Muslim population in Greece was 126.017).

During the interwar period, the toponym Chameria was in common use within the region and was also the official name for the area above the Acheron river used in all government documents by the Greek state. In 1936, the Greek state created a new prefecture called Thesprotia, from parts of Ioannina and Preveza prefectures, as to exercise better control over the Muslim Albanian Cham minority.

During the Axis occupation of Greece (1941–1944), large parts of the Muslim Cham community collaborated with the Italian and German forces as Axis forces manipulated the Cham issue to encourage beneficial resistance to Greek rule in the region. In the early 1940s, 1,800 Cham conscripts were disarmed by Greek forces and set to perform hard labor on infrastructure improvements, and all Albanian males who had not yet been conscripted were deported to internment camps or placed in exile on Greek islands.

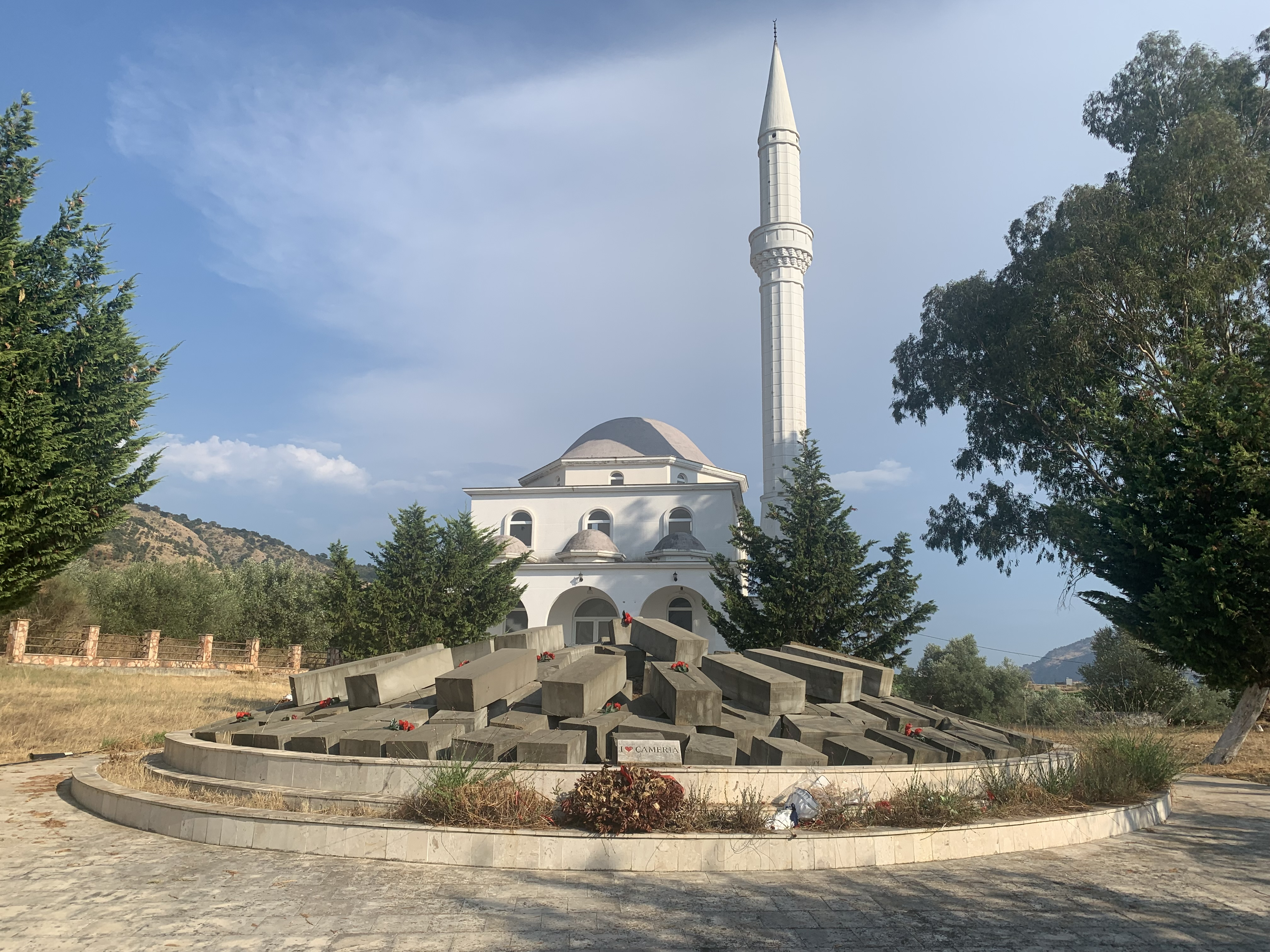
The "Trendafilat e Çamërise" Monumental Cemetery in Kllogjer, Konispol, dedicated to the expulsion of Cham Albanians during 1944–1945.

At the end of World War II, Cham Albanians were systematically cleansed from the region by the guerrilla forces of the right-wing National Republican Greek League (EDES) led by Napoleon Zervas. Some Muslim Chams who formed the Chameria Battalion provided military support to the left-wing resistance forces of the Greek People's Liberation Army (ELAS). After the Cham Albanians declined to fight against ELAS, Zervas ordered a mass assault on Cham villages by forces which mainly consisted of EDES and local Greek peasantry eager to exact their revenge on the richer minority of Cham Albanians.

A former Chameria membership of the Unrepresented Nations and Peoples Organization (UNPO), via the organization Democratic Foundation of Chameria, was admitted on 8 June 2015. The membership was eventually suspended in December 2019.

== Demographics ==
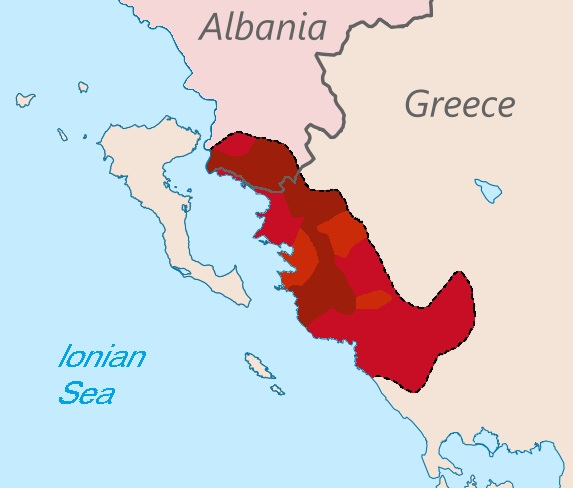
Maximum extent of Cham Albanian dialect: 19th century till 1912/1913 (Hatched line), according to Kokolakis.M. Population (irrespective of linguistic background) shown by religion: Muslim majority (Brown), Orthodox majority (Pink), Mixed (Light Brown). Colored areas do not imply that Albanian-speakers formed the majority of the population.

Since the Medieval Ages, the population of the region of Chameria was of mixed and complex ethnicity, with a blurring of group identities such as Albanian and Greek, along with many other ethnic groups. Information on the ethnic composition of the region over several centuries is almost entirely absent, with the strong likelihood that they did not fit into standard "national" patterns, as the 19th-century revolutionary nationalist movements wanted.

=== Historical ===
In the early 19th century, Greek scholar and secretary of the local Ottoman ruler Ali Pasha, Athanasios Psalidas, stated that Chameria was inhabited by both Greeks and Albanians. The later were divided between Christians and Muslims, while Greeks were the dominant element of Chameria. An Ottoman population census held in 1908 recorded a total of 73,000 inhabitants in Chameria, of which 93% were Albanian.

In Greek censuses, only Muslims of the region were counted as Albanians. According to the 1913 Greek census, 25,000 Muslims were living at the time in the Chameria region who had Albanian as their mother tongue, from a total population of about 60,000, while in 1923 there were 20,319 Muslim Chams. In the Greek census of 1928, there were 17,008 Muslims who had it as their mother tongue. During the interwar period, the numbers of Albanian speakers in official Greek censuses varied and fluctuated, due to political motives and manipulation.

An estimation by Italian occupational forces during World War II (1941) included Orthodox communities of Albanian ethnicity. According to this in the region lived 54,000 Albanians, of whom 26,000 Orthodox and 28,000 Muslim and 20,000 Greeks. After the war, according to Greek censuses where ethno-linguistic groups were counted, Muslim Chams were 113 in 1947 and 127 in 1951. In the same Greek census of 1951, 7,357 Orthodox Albanian-speakers were counted within the whole of Epirus.

Ethnoreligious groups in historic Chameria
Year	Muslims	Albanian-speaking Orthodox	Muslims plus Albanian-speaking Orthodox	Greek-speaking Orthodox	Aromanian-speaking Orthodox	Total population	Source
1908, for the smaller definition of historic Chameria	34,406	11,662	46,068	28,676	250	74,844	Statistics by Amadori Virgili, presented by the "Pan-Epirotic Union of America" for the Paris peace conference.
1908, for the larger definition of historic Chameria	42,174	14,162	56,336	134,054	11,050	201,440	Statistics by Amadori Virgili, presented by the "Pan-Epirotic Union of America" for the Paris peace conference.

Chams in Thesprotia Greece (1908–1951)
Year	Muslim Albanians	Orthodox Albanian speakers	Total number of Albanian speakers	Total population	Source
1913	25,000	---	Unknown	59,000	Greek census
1923	20,319	---	Unknown	58,780	Greek census
1925	25,000	---	25,000	58,000	Albanian government
1928	17,008	---	Unknown	68,200	Greek census (Number of Muslims in Epirus)
1938	17,311	---	Unknown	71,000	Greek government
1940	21,000–22,000	---	Unknown	72,000	Estimation on Greek census
1941	28,000	26,000	54,000		Italian estimation (by Axis occupational forces during World War Two)
1947	113	---	Unknown		Greek census
1951	127	---	Unknown		Greek census. 7,357 Orthodox Albanian-speakers were also counted within the whole of Epirus.

=== Current ===
With the exception of the part of Chameria lying in Albania, Chameria is inhabited mostly by Greeks at the end of World War II, and the subsequent assimilation of remaining Chams. The number of ethnic Albanians still residing in the Chameria region is uncertain, since the Greek government does not include ethnic and linguistic categories in any official census.

==== Muslims ====
The Greek census of 1951 counted a total of 127 Muslim Albanian Chams in Epirus. In more recent years (1986) 44 members of this community are found in Thesprotia, located in the settlements of Sybota, Kodra and Polyneri (previously Koutsi). Moreover, until recently the Muslim community in Polyneri was the only one in Epirus to have an imam. The village mosque was the last within the area before being blown up by a local Christian in 1972. The number of Muslim Chams remaining in the area after World War II included also people who converted to Orthodoxy and were assimilated into the local population in order to preserve their properties and themselves.

==== Christian Orthodox ====
According to a study by the Euromosaic project of the European Union, Albanian speaking communities live along the border with Albania in Thesprotia prefecture, the northern part of the Preveza prefecture in the region called Thesprotiko, and a few villages in Ioannina regional unit. The Albanian language is still spoken by a minority of inhabitants in Igoumenitsa. In northern Preveza prefecture, those communities also include the region of Fanari, in villages such as Ammoudia and Agia. In 1978, some of the older inhabitants in these communities were Albanian monolinguals. Younger people also spoke Albanian, as when members of the local working-age population migrated to Athens or abroad in search of employment opportunities, the children were left with their grandparents, thus creating a continuity of speakers.

Today, these Orthodox Albanian speaking communities refer to themselves as Arvanites in the Greek language and self-identify as Greeks, like the Arvanite communities in southern Greece. They refer to their language in Greek as Arvanitika and when conversing in Albanian as Shqip. In contrast with the Arvanites, some have retained a distinct linguistic and ethnic identity, but also an Albanian national identity. In the presence of foreigners, there is a stronger reluctance amongst Orthodox Albanian speakers to speak Albanian, compared to the Arvanites in other parts of Greece. Among those who are descended from Chams, a reluctance for declaring themselves as such has been noted. Researcher Tom Winnifirth concluded that it was impossible to find Albanian speakers in the main towns of the region, assuming that there may be a number in some inland villages. and concluded in later years that Albanian had "virtually disappeared" in the region primarily due to the language being discouraged and outlawed. According to Ethnologue, the Albanian speaking population of Greek Epirus and Greek Western Macedonia number 10,000. According to the author Miranda Vickers, Orthodox Chams numbered to approximately 40,000 people in 1999. Amongst some Greek Arvanites, such as those in the village of Kastri near Igoumentisa, there has been a revival in folklore, particularly in the performance of the "Arvanitic wedding".

== See also ==
- Cham issue
- Albanian nationalism
- Chamerian cuisine
