= Ismail Kadare bibliography =

The following is a list of the publications of Albanian writer Ismail Kadare (1936–2024).

== English translations ==
- A Girl in Exile (Albanian: E penguara) ISBN 978-1-61902-916-3
- Agamemnon's Daughter (Albanian: Vajza e Agamemnonit) ISBN 978-1-55970-788-6
- Broken April (Albanian: Prilli i thyer) ISBN 978-0-941533-57-7
- Chronicle in Stone (Albanian: Kronikë në gur) ISBN 978-0-941533-00-3
- Doruntine (The Ghost Rider) (Albanian: Kush e solli Doruntinën?) ISBN 978-1-84767-341-1
- Elegy for Kosovo (Albanian: Tri këngë zie për Kosovën) ISBN 978-1-55970-528-8
- Spiritus (novel)
- Spring Flowers, Spring Frost (Albanian: Lulet e ftohta të marsit) ISBN 978-1-55970-635-3
- Twilight of the Eastern Gods (Albanian: Muzgu i perëndive të stepës) ISBN 978-0-8021-2311-4
- The Blinding Order (Albanian: Qorrfermani) ISBN 978-1611451085
- The Concert (Albanian: Koncert në fund të dimrit) ISBN 978-0-688-09762-2
- The Doll: A Portrait of My Mother
- The Fall of the Stone City (Albanian: Darka e Gabuar) ISBN 978-0-8021-2068-7
- The File on H (Albanian: Dosja H: roman) ISBN 978-1-55970-401-4
- The General of the Dead Army (Albanian: Gjenerali i ushtrisë së vdekur) ISBN 9780099518266
- The Palace of Dreams (Albanian: Pallati i ëndrrave) ISBN 978-0-688-11183-0
- The Pyramid (Albanian: Piramida) ISBN 978-1-55970-314-7
- The Siege (Albanian: Kështjella) ISBN 978-1-84767-185-1
- The Successor (Albanian: Pasardhësi) ISBN 978-1-55970-773-2
- The Traitor's Niche (Albanian: Kamarja e turpit) ISBN 978-1-64009-044-6
- The Three-Arched Bridge (Albanian: Ura me tri harqe) ISBN 978-1-55970-368-0
- Essays on World Literature: Aeschylus • Dante • Shakespeare (Albanian: Tri sprova mbi letërsinë botërore) ISBN 9781632061751
- Stormy Weather on Mount Olympus (Albanian: Stinë e mërzitshme në Olimp)
- The Accident (Albanian: Aksidenti) ISBN 978-0-8021-2995-6
- The Doll: A Portrait of My Mother (Albanian: Kukulla) ISBN 978-1-64009-422-2
- A Dictator Calls (Albanian: Kur sunduesit grinden) ISBN 978-1-64009-608-0

== Albanian ==
=== Novels and novellas ===
- Gjenerali i ushtrisë së vdekur (The General of the Dead Army) (1963)
- Përbindëshi (The Monster) (1965)
- Dasma (The Wedding) (1968)
- Kështjella (The Siege) (1970)
- Kronikë në gur (Chronicle in Stone) (1971)
- Dimri i vetmisë së madhe (The Winter of Great Solitude) (1973) ISBN 978-99956-87-85-4
- Nëntori i një kryeqyteti (November of a Capital) (1975)
- Muzgu i perëndive të stepës (Twilight of the Eastern Gods) (1976)
- Komisioni i festës (The Feast Commission) (1978) ISBN 9789989572296
- Ura me tri harqe (The Three-Arched Bridge) (1978)
- Kamarja e turpit (The Traitor's Niche) (1978) ISBN 9781784873202
- Prilli i thyer (Broken April) (1980)
- Kush e solli Doruntinën? (The Ghost Rider) (1980)
- Pallati i ëndrrave (The Palace of Dreams) (1981)
- Nata me hënë (A Moonlit Night) (1985)
- Viti i mbrapshtë (The Dark Year) (1984)
- Krushqit janë të ngrirë (The Wedding Procession Turned to Ice) (1983)
- Koncert në fund të dimrit (The Concert) (1988)
- Dosja H. (The File on H.) (1989)
- Qorrfermani (The Blinding Order) (1991) ISBN 978-1611451085
- Piramida (The Pyramid) (1992)
- Hija (The Shadow) (1994)
- Shkaba (The Eagle) (1995)
- Spiritus (1996)
- Qyteti pa reklama (The City with no Signs) (1998, written in 1959)
- Lulet e ftohta të marsit (Spring Flowers, Spring Frost) (2000)
- Breznitë e Hankonatëve (2000) ISBN 978-9928-164-16-2
- Vajza e Agamemnonit (Agamemnon's Daughter) (2003)
- Pasardhësi (The Successor) (2003)
- Jeta, loja dhe vdekja Lul Mazrekut (Life, Game and Death of Lul Mazreku) (2003)
- Çështje të marrëzisë (A Question of Lunacy) (2005)
- Darka e Gabuar (The Fall of the Stone City) (2008)
- E penguara: Rekuiem për Linda B. (A Girl in Exile) (2009)
- Aksident (The Accident) (2004)
- Mjegullat e Tiranës (Tirana's Mists) (2014, originally written in 1957–58) ISBN 978-9928-186-04-1
- Kukulla (The Doll) (2015)

=== Poetry ===
- Frymëzime djaloshare (1954)
- Ëndërrimet (1957)
- Princesha Argjiro (1957)
- Përse mendohen këto male (1964)
- Motive me diell (1968)
- Koha (1976)
- Ca pika shiu ranë mbi qelq (2004) OCLC 53981405
- Pa formë është qielli (2005) ISBN 9789992745151
- Vepra poetike në një vëllim (2018) ISBN 978-9928-226-94-5

=== Essays ===
- Autobiografia e popullit në vargje (The People's Autobiography in Verse) (1971)
- Eskili, ky humbës i madh (Aeschylus, The Lost) (1985)
- Ftesë në studio (Invitation to the Writer's Studio) (1990)
- Nga një dhjetor në tjetrin (Albanian Spring) (1991)
- Legjenda e legjendave (1996)
- Kushëriri i engjëjve (The Angels' Cousin) (1997) ISBN 978-9928-164-13-1
- Kombi shqiptar në prag të mijëvjeçarit të tretë (The Albanian Nation on the Threshold of the Third Millennium) (1998) OCLC 42591890
- Unaza në kthetra (The Ring on the Claw) (2001) ISBN 9789992745304
- Poshtërimi në Ballkan (Abasement in the Balkans) (2004)
- Identiteti evropian i shqiptarëve (The European Identity of Albanians) (2006)
- Dantja i pashmangshëm (Dante, The Inevitable) (2006)
- Hamlet, le prince impossible (Hamlet, The Impossible Prince) (2007)
- Don Kishoti në Ballkan (Don Quixote in the Balkans) (2009)
- Mosmarrëveshja, mbi raportet e Shqipërisë me vetveten (2010) ISBN 978-9928-164-24-7
- Mbi krimin në Ballkan; Letërkëmbim i zymtë (On Crime in the Balkans)(2011)
- Çlirimi i Serbisë prej Kosovës (Serbia's Liberation from Kosovo) (2012) ISBN 978-99956-87-92-2
- Mëngjeset në Kafe Rostand (Mornings in Cafe Rostand) (2014) ISBN 9789928186256
- Arti si mëkat (Art as a Sin) (2015) ISBN 978-9928-186-63-8
- Uragani i ndërprerë: Ardhja e Migjenit në letërsinë shqipe (The Interrupted Hurricane: The Advent of Migjeni in Albanian Literature) (2015) ISBN 978-9928-186-58-4
- Tri sprova mbi letërsinë botërore (Essays on World Literature) (2017) ISBN 978-9928-226-88-4
- Kur sunduesit grinden (When Rulers Quarrel) (2018) ISBN 978-9928-261-44-1

=== Story collections ===
- Emblema e dikurshme (1977)
- Ëndërr mashtruese (1991)
- Tri këngë zie për Kosovën (1998)
- Vjedhja e gjumit mbretëror (1999) ISBN 9789928164148
- Përballë pasqyrës së një gruaje (2001)
- Bisedë për brilantet në pasditen e dhjetorit (2013) ISBN 9789928164407
- Koha e dashurisë (Rrëfim Trikohësh) (2015) ISBN 978-9928-186-87-4
- Proza e shkurtër, në një vëllim (2018) ISBN 978-9928-261-05-2

== See also ==
- Kadare Prize
- Albanian literature
