= Arcade Publishing =

Independent trade publisher

- Parent company: Skyhorse Publishing
- Founded: 1988
- Founder: Richard Seaver and Jeannette Seaver
- Country of origin: United States
- Publication types: Books
- Official website: www.arcadepub.com

Arcade Publishing is an imprint of the American book publisher Skyhorse. Founded in 1988 by Richard Seaver and his wife Jeannette, it was originally an independent company publishing trade fiction and nonfiction. After declaring bankruptcy following Richard's death in 2009, Arcade was acquired by Skyhorse Publishing in 2010 and relaunched the following year.

In addition to its main list, Arcade now also issues Arcade Artists & Art, a series featuring books by and about artists, particularly of the modern period. Jeannette Seaver serves as a consulting editor in the acquisition and curation of upcoming lists.

Auschwitz by Miklos Nyiszli became a New York Times bestseller in 2011. The company has also published a number of books by Albanian author Ismail Kadare, including Elegy for Kosovo, The Successor, Spring Flowers, Spring Frost, Agamemnon's Daughter, The File on H., The Pyramid, and The Three-Arched Bridge.
