= The Great Winter =

1977 novel by Ismail Kadare

The Great Winter (Albanian: Dimri i Madh) is a novel by the Albanian writer Ismail Kadare. It was first published in 1977.

== Plot ==
The action of the novel takes place during 1960/1961, when a crisis occurred in Albanian-Soviet relations. The protagonist of the novel is journalist Besnik Struga, who travels to Moscow as a translator for the Albanian delegation. In the capital of the USSR, he becomes a witness to the negotiations and intrigues that take place during an exceptionally harsh winter. The negotiations taking place in Moscow were largely reconstructed by Kadare based on authentic meeting protocols and witness accounts. The severance of Albanian-Soviet relations in November 1961, a consequence of the "Great Winter," becomes a surprising fact for several characters that Kadare has placed in his novel.

The first version of the novel, published in 1973, was titled "The Winter of Great Solitude" (Albanian: "Dimri i Vetmisë së Madhe"). Based on the motifs of the novel, a film titled "Face to Face" (Ballë për ballë), directed by Kujtim Çashku and Piro Milkani, was made in 1979.

== Translations ==
- 1980: Den hårda vintern ((in Swedish) trans. Marianne Eyre), Stockholm
- 1988: Le Grand hiver ((in French) trans. Jusuf Vrioni), Paris
- 1989: Der große Winter ((in German)), Munich
- 1990: Uzun kış ((in Turkish) trans. Hüseyin Kahverengi), Istanbul
- 1991: El gran invierno ((in Spanish) trans. Jesús Hernández), Madrid
- 1992: Surowaja zima ((in Russian) trans. M. Modestow, I. Woronina), Moscow
- 1995: زمستان سخت ((in Persian) trans. Mahastī Baḥraynī), Teheran

== See also ==
- Ismail Kadare bibliography
