= 意外 =

意外 meaning "accident".

It may refer to:

- Accident (2009 film), 2009 Hong Kong action thriller film
- An Unexpected Journey, 2013 Chinese album by Chinese singer Joker Xue

== See also ==
- Accident (disambiguation)
- Unexpected Journey (disambiguation)
