= The Accident =

The Accident may refer to:

== Film and television ==
- The Accident (film), a 1963 French film
- The Accident (British TV series), a 2019 British drama television series
- The Accident (Mexican TV series), a 2024 Mexican thriller drama television series
- "The Accident" (Dynasty 1984), a television episode
- "The Accident" (Dynasty 1986), a television episode
- "The Accident" (Homicide: Life on the Street), or "Subway", a television episode

== Literature ==
- The Accident (Wiesel novel) or Day, a 1962 novel by Elie Wiesel
- The Accident, a 2010 novel by Ismail Kadare
- The Accident, a 1955 novel by Dexter Masters
- The Accident, a 2014 novel by Chris Pavone

== Astronomy ==
- WISE 1534–1043, a brown dwarf referred to as "The Accident"

== See also ==
- Accident (disambiguation)
