= The Traitor's Niche =

1978 novel by Ismail Kadare

- Author: Ismail Kadare
- Original title: Kamarja e turpit
- Translator: John Hodgson
- Language: Albanian
- Publisher: Naim Frashëri Publishing House, Harvill Secker
- Publication date: 1978
- Publication place: Albania
- English publication date: 2017
- Pages: 208
- ISBN: 9781784873202

The Traitor's Niche (Albanian: Kamarja e turpit) is a historical novel by the Albanian author Ismail Kadare. It was first published in Tirana, Albania, in 1978. The English translation by John Hodgson was published in 2017. It is part of a loose trilogy that includes The Three-Arched Bridge and The Palace of Dreams.

== Contents ==
The story is told from a number of perspectives, opening in the Ottoman imperial capital of Istanbul, where a newly married soldier stands guard over the niche in which the head of a traitor is put on display. The narrative moves back and forth between Istanbul and Albania, following the route of Tundj Hata, the imperial courier whose job it is to transport the severed heads of traitors for display in the capital. The narrative takes place against the failure of Ali Pasha of Ioannina's 1820–1822 rebellion against the sultan, detailing repressive measures intended to prevent future rebellion.

It has been suggested that Ali Pasha's rebellion against the Ottomans is in some way intended as a parallel to Enver Hoxha's break with the Soviet Union.

== Reception ==
The English translation was longlisted for the Man Booker International Prize 2017.
