= Twilight of the Eastern Gods =

Novel by Ismail Kadare

- First edition (Albanian)
- Author: Ismail Kadare
- Original title: Muzgu i perëndive të stepës
- Translator: David Bellos
- Language: Albanian
- Publisher: Onufri Publishing House, Canongate Books
- Publication date: 1962–1978
- Publication place: Albania
- English publication date: 2014
- Pages: 192
- ISBN: 9780857866196

Twilight of the Eastern Gods (Albanian: Muzgu i perëndive të stepës, French: Le Crépuscule des dieux de la steppe) is a novel by the Albanian author Ismail Kadare. It was published in installments in Albania between 1962 and 1978, and published in full in 1981 in the French translation of Jusuf Vrioni. The English translation by David Bellos, published in 2014, was made from Vrioni's French.

The narrator is a young Albanian studying at the Maxim Gorky Literature Institute in the late 1950s, working on a novel about "a dead army commanded by a living general". The book focuses on the drabness of life in the student residence, and the suspicions and disaffection of the writers being trained to produce Socialist realist literature. The action of the novel takes place during the Soviet propaganda campaign that forced Boris Pasternak to decline the Nobel prize for literature for Dr Zhivago. It provides a lively parody of the fake public outrage of the campaign.

Parallels with the life of Kadare, who also studied at the Gorky Institute in the late 1950s, and wrote an early novel entitled The General of the Dead Army (1963), suggest that the narrator should be regarded as an alter ego of the author.
