= Spiritus (novel) =

1996 novel by Ismail Kadare

- Author: Ismail Kadare
- Original title: Spiritus
- Language: Albanian
- Publisher: Onufri
- Publication date: 1996
- Publication place: Albania
- English publication date: none
- Pages: 328

Spiritus is a 1996 novel by the Albanian writer Ismail Kadare. It marks a narrative and compositional turning point in his literary career. The influence of this novel will be felt in all of Kadare's subsequent novels. It is a novel about the anxiety of wiretapping.

== Plot ==
A group of foreigners touring Eastern Europe after the fall of communism hears exciting rumours during its stay in Albania about the capture of the spirit from the dead. As it turns out, the spirit is in fact a listening device known to the notorious secret service as a "hornet".

== See also ==
- Albanian literature
- The Palace of Dreams

== Bibliography ==
- Apolloni, Ag (2012). Paradigma e proteut ("Gjenerali i ushtrisë së vdekur"): monografi (in Albanian). Prishtinë: OM. ISBN 9789951632041.
- Jose Carlos Rodrigo Breto (2018). Ismail Kadare: La grand estratagema (in Spanish). Barcelona: Ediciones del Subsuelo. ISBN 978-84-947802-0-2.
