= The Fall of the Stone City =

Albanian fiction novel by Ismail Kadare

- First edition cover showing Moche burial mask from Peru, A.D. 525–550.
- Author: Ismail Kadare
- Original title: Darka e gabuar
- Translator: John Hodgson
- Language: Albanian
- Genre: historical fiction, political fiction
- Publisher: Onufri
- Publication date: 2008
- Publication place: Albania
- English publication date: 2013
- Pages: 176
- ISBN: 978-0857860125

The Fall of the Stone City (Albanian: Darka e gabuar) is a 2008 novel by the Albanian writer Ismail Kadare. Apart from winning the Rexhai Surroi Prize for the best book of the year, in Kosovo the novel was also shortlisted for the Independent Foreign Fiction Prize in 2013.

== Background ==
Kadare had previously written about his home city Gjirokastër in his earlier novels Chronicle in Stone and A Question of Lunacy.

== Reception ==
Characterizing it as "a masterful recuperation" from Kadare's previous novel, The Accident, Peter Carty from The Independent went on to describe it as "an outstanding feat of imagination delivered in inimitable style, alternating between the darkly elusive and the menacingly playful.".

== See also ==
- Albanian literature
