= Dobi =

Dobi is a family name (surname) originating in Hungary. It is mostly prevalent in Hungary, Albania, Serbia and the United States.

== Etymology ==
The surname may originate from the Hungarian personal name Dabó (Transylvanian form Dobó), or from a pet form of the personal name Dob. Another theory on the origin of the Dobi surname may be as a diminutive of the Saxon personal name Hrodebert (ancient form of the English name Robert).

== Dobi surname in Albania ==
The Dobi Family of Gjirokastra, in Albania is considered to be one of the oldest families and it is believed that they had first settled in the citadel inside the Gjirokastër Fortress by the year 1380. Since then, there have been 30 generations of people with the Dobi surname.

A line of the Dobi family had established landholdings in the village of Damës, in the region of Tepelena, but by the end of the 16th century most of them had moved to Gjirokastra and the cadet branch of the family that stayed back in Damës formed the core of the Iliriani family. According to legend, throughout the centuries the Dobi family has been involved mainly with commerce, especially in the trade of mules for transport, which helps explain the presence of the mule in escutcheon of the Family's heraldic coat of arms.

By the 1780s, members of the Dobi family started spreading from their dwellings inside the castle to other areas of the city, mainly in the "Hazmurat" neighborhood. These new dwellings were mainly of 2 to 3 stories high and surrounded by thick stone walls. In architectural style, they were similar to the other tower houses typical of Gjirokastra, the most famous of which being the Zekate House. Throughout the years, the Dobi family continued growing and expanding throughout the city in other desirable neighborhoods, such as "Upper Palorto", "Lower Palorto", "Manalat" and "Cfarkë", and by 1945 they were considered to be one of the largest families of Gjirokastra, with 6 major branches.

Members of the Dobi family of Gjirokastra have been active in the struggle for Albanian Independence and in World War II fighting against fascism, where is worth mentioning Istref Dobi, who at 17 years of age took part in the armed conflict for the liberation of Vlora in 1920, or the 12 members of the Dobi family who were active in the Antifascist National Liberation Movement of Albania during World War II.

After the end of World War II, many members of the Dobi family moved from Gjirokastra towards the capital city, Tirana, a process which had started since the 1930s, and as a consequence there are only 3 families bearing the Dobi surname living in Gjirokastra at the moment.

In addition to migration inside of Albania, many members of the Dobi family emigrated to other countries, especially to Thessaloniki in modern-day Greece or the cities of Istanbul and İzmir in Turkey. In the 1990s, as with many other Albanians, many members of the Dobi family emigrated towards the United States, and nowadays Albanians with the Dobi surname have settled primarily in the states of New York, New Jersey, Massachusetts and Pennsylvania.

=== Notable Albanians with the Dobi surname ===
Most of the members of the Dobi family of Albania have traditionally been involved with commerce and civil administration, being well-respected in the fields of jurisprudence, education, military, engineering and natural sciences. In these fields, there was a contribution of Kledin Dobi in mathematics; Haki Dobi in finance; Arben Dobi and Drini Dobi in health care. Also, successors of the Dobi family of Gjirokastra have been involved in Albanian politics, as is the case of Bashkim Kopliku, former Deputy Prime Minister and former Minister of Internal Affairs of the Republic of Albania, the oldest son of lady Kadrie Dobi a respected lecturer of History and a graduate of the University of Rome. Others have affirmed themselves in the field of literature, which includes the poetry of Nesibe Dobi, believed to be the first female poet of Albanian literature, and Ismail Kadare an Albanian writer of world renown, and the son of lady Hatixhe Dobi.

== Notable people ==
- Edina Dobi (born 1987), Hungarian volleyball player
- Enkeleid Dobi (born 1975), Albanian footballer
- István Dobi (1898–1968), Hungarian politician, Prime Minister of Hungary 1948–1952
- Kledin Dobi (born 1988), Albanian–American mathematician, minor planet 21517 Dobi is named after him
- Tedi Dobi, current Deputy Minister of Justice of the Republic of Albania

== See also ==
- 21517 Dobi
