= Accidental =

Accidental may refer to:

- Accidental (music), a symbol which changes the pitch of a note
- Accidental (album), by Fred Frith
- Accidental (biology), a biological phenomenon more commonly known as vagrancy
- The Accidental, a 2005 novel by Ali Smith
- The Accidental (band), a UK folk band
- Accidental property, a philosophical term

== See also ==
- Accidence (or inflection), a modification of a word to express different grammatical categories
- Accident (disambiguation)
- Adventitious, which is closely related to "accidental" as used in philosophy and in biology
- Random, which often is used incorrectly where accidental or adventitious would be appropriate
