= When Rulers Quarrel =

2018 work by Ismail Kadare

- First edition (Albanian)
- Author: Ismail Kadare
- Original title: Kur sunduesit grinden
- Language: Albanian
- Genre: essay
- Publisher: Onufri
- Publication date: 2018
- Publication place: Albania

When Rulers Quarrel is a work by Albanian writer Ismail Kadare, dealing with the relationship between rulers and literature. It was launched on 16 November 2018 at the 21st National Book Fair in Tirana.

== Background ==
During an interview in December 2016 the writer's wife Helena Kadare announced that Kadare was writing a book about Boris Pasternak.

In July 2018 Kadare's Albanian publisher, Bujar Hudhri, after denying claims made by some media that the writer had been hospitalized, announced that Kadare's newest work "Kur sunduesit grinden" (When Rulers Quarrel) would be published in November of the same year.

== Content ==
This work deals with the stories of famous writers who have managed to survive and outlive dictatorships, while dictators have died and fallen into oblivion. The story of the Soviet writer Boris Pasternak serves as a binding thread of the work.
