= Spring Flowers, Spring Frost =

2000 novel by Ismail Kadare

- First edition
- Author: Ismail Kadare
- Original title: Lulet e Ftohta të marsit
- Translator: David Bellos
- Cover artist: Kazimir Malevich, Head of Peasant - 1932
- Language: Albanian
- Genre: novel
- Publisher: Onufri Publishing House, The Harvill Press
- Publication date: 2000
- Publication place: Albania
- English publication date: 2002
- Pages: 182
- ISBN: 978-0099449836

Spring Flowers, Spring Frost (Albanian: Lulet e ftohta të marsit, lit. 'Cold Flowers of March') is a 2000 novel by Albanian author Ismail Kadare set in the 1990s when feuding and vendetta had returned to the country after the fall of the communist regime. The English translation by David Bellos was first published by The Harvill Press in 2002, and then by Vintage Books in 2003. It was translated not directly from Albanian, but from the French translation by Jusuf Vrioni (published by Fayard).
