= The Pyramid (Kadare novel) =

Book by Ismail Kadare

- First edition (Albanian)
- Author: Ismail Kadare
- Translator: Jusuf Vrioni & David Bellos
- Language: Albanian
- Genre: Novel, Fiction
- Published: 1992
- Publisher: Çabej (Albania); Arcade Publishing (USA); Harvill Press (UK)
- Publication place: Albania
- English publication date: 1 February 1996
- Media type: Print (Hardback & Paperback)
- Pages: 224 p. (hardback edition)
- ISBN: 1-55970-314-8 (US hardback edition) & ISBN 1-86046-123-9 (UK hardback edition)
- OCLC: 32429764
- Dewey Decimal: 891/.9913 20
- LC Class: PG9621.K3 P5813 1996

The Pyramid (Albanian: Piramida) is a 1992 novel written by Ismail Kadare. It is considered to serve both literary and dissident purposes. It is a political allegory of absolute political power.

== Background ==
The first part of the novel was written in 1988-1990 but was rejected by the state publisher. It was serialized in January 1991 in several issues of the new opposition newspaper Democratic Renaissance. After the establishment of pluralism and democracy in Albania, it was completed and published in Tirana and Paris.

== Plot ==
The Pyramid is a political allegory set in ancient Egypt. It is the tale of the conception and construction of the Great Pyramid of Giza by Cheops, but also of absolute political power.

== Reception ==
The New York Times picked up on the significance of The Pyramid:

"For the pyramid, viewed by his subjects as an abiding symbol of his total and incontestable power, comes to be seen by him as a personal memento mori, a constant and paralyzing reminder that his brief life will give way to an eternal entombment in stone."

In 1993, the novel was awarded the Prix Méditerranée Étranger in France.

== See also ==
- Albanian literature
- Communist Albania
- Ismail Kadare
