= A Girl in Exile =

2009 novel by Ismail Kadare

- First edition (publ. Onufri); Cover art: detail from Venus and the Three Graces Presenting Gifts to a Young Woman by Botticelli, 1480s
- Author: Ismail Kadare
- Original title: E penguara: Rekuiem për Linda B.
- Translator: John Hodgson
- Cover artist: Botticelli
- Language: Albanian
- Publication date: 2009
- Publication place: Albania
- English publication date: 2016
- Pages: 192

A Girl in Exile: Requiem for Linda B. (Albanian: E penguara: Rekuiem për Linda B., lit. 'Hindered: Requiem for Linda B.') is a novel by Albanian author Ismail Kadare. It has been described as "one of Kadare's best novels".

Originally published in Albanian in 2009, the English translation by John Hodgson came out in 2016.
