= The Blinding Order =

1991 novel by Ismail Kadare

- Author: Ismail Kadare
- Original title: Qorrfermani
- Language: Albanian
- Genre: Dystopian fiction, political fiction
- Publisher: Onufri
- Publication date: 1991
- Publication place: Albania
- English publication date: 2005
- Pages: 90
- ISBN: 978-1611451085

The Blinding Order (Albanian: Qorrfermani, lit. 'Curse It') is a short novel written by Ismail Kadare in 1984 and published in 1991, shortly after the collapse of the hoxhaist regime in Albania. Set in the 19th-century Ottoman Empire, The Blinding Order is a parable about the use of terror by authoritarian regimes, and it is linked through its main subplot to the author's banned 1981 novel The Palace of Dreams.

== Background ==
Kadare wrote The Blinding Order in the aftermath of a terror campaign in Communist Albania.

== Plot ==
The plot centres on a religious order issued by a Sultan, calling for all people with the "dubious power" of the evil eye to be blinded, and the subsequent terror campaign that follows. All this is narrated in a "fable tone of one thousand and one nightmare nights".

== Reception ==
Describing the novel as "superbly plotted" and "charged with bitter black humor," Kirkus Reviews praised it as "a masterly parable worthy of comparison with José Saramago's Nobel-anointed fiction. Boyd Tonkin from The Independent described it as "a chilling fable of inscrutable tyranny and collective surrender". Wolfgang Schneider from Frankfurter Allgemeine Zeitung, while reviewing Der Raub des Königlichen Schlafs – a volume of 12 stories, novellas and short novels by Kadare, published in German –singled out The Blinding Order as the best one, describing it as a "grandiose story". According to him, it gives "literary form" to the "horror of the sabotage-accusation"-which numerous people in socialist countries fell victim to.

== See also ==
- Albanian literature
