= The Palace of Dreams =

1981 novel by Ismail Kadare

- First US edition (publ. William Morrow & Co, 1993)
- Author: Ismail Kadare
- Original title: Pallati i ëndrrave
- Language: Albanian
- Genre: Dystopian, historical fiction, political fiction
- Publisher: Onufri
- Publication date: 1981
- Publication place: Albania
- English publication date: 1993
- Pages: 208
- ISBN: 978-1611453270

The Palace of Dreams (Albanian: Pallati i ëndrrave) is a 1981 novel by the Albanian writer Ismail Kadare. Set ostensibly in the Ottoman Empire, but in a deliberately imprecise past shaded by myth and intended to represent the modern totalitarian state, The Palace of Dreams follows the rapid rise of Mark-Alem, a young Ottoman Albanian related to the powerful Köprülü family, within the bureaucratic regime of the title palace, a shady ministry whose objective is to gather, examine and interpret the dreams of the empire's subjects in order to uncover the master-dreams, which are believed to show the future destiny of the Sultan and the state.

Conceived in the years 1972-1973 and written between 1976 and 1981, The Palace of Dreams is widely regarded as one of Kadare's masterpieces. After an emergency meeting of the Albanian Writers Union and a public denunciation by Ramiz Alia, Enver Hoxha's designated successor, the novel was banned two weeks after its publication, even though, "in an absurdist twist", by that time, the book had already sold out.

== Background ==
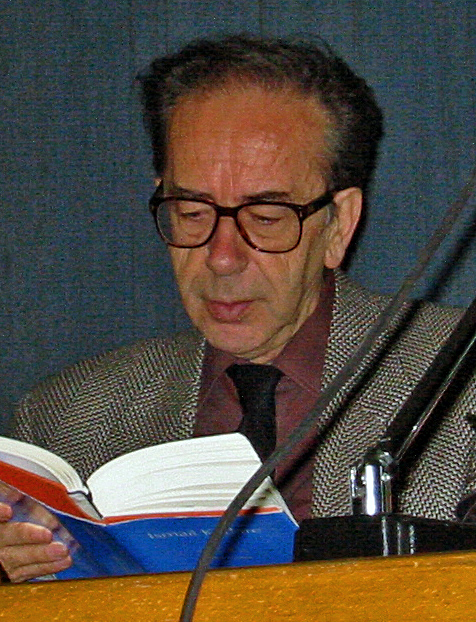
Ismail Kadare

Kadare camouflaged an excerpt of The Palace of Dreams as a short story and published it, alongside Broken April, The Ghost Rider, and The Wedding, in his 1980 collection of four novellas, Gjakftohtësia (Cold-bloodedness). Due to its seemingly historical nature, the excerpt went unnoticed by the censors. The following year, under the same title, Kadare managed to sneak the whole novel into the second edition of Emblema e dikurshme (Signs of the past); due to the fact that the story had already been green-lighted once, it managed to escape the attention of the censors once again.

However, people started noticing how much the novel setting resembled the inner city of Tirana, especially the Skanderbeg Square from which one could clearly see the Central Committee of the Albanian Party of Labour a few meters away; the buffet and the archive of the Palace of Dreams also reminding people of their similar counterparts of that building. Resemblances between the totalitarian atmosphere in the novel and the climate of terror in Enver Hoxha's Albania were also picked up by the readers, as was that, despite being set in the Ottoman Empire, the novel showed little to no attempts on the author's part, at historical accuracy; on the contrary, in fact, the novel abounds in deliberate anachronisms and ambiguous passages whose aim is to make the story as current and actual as possible - this being a common feature of most of Kadare's novels.

== Plot ==
Set in the "sybaritic if somewhat torpid atmosphere of the Ottoman Empire", The Palace of Dreams is, according to his own statement, a realization of Kadare's long-term dream to construct a personalized vision of hell, devised as a modern counterpart to Dante's Inferno, and usually likened by literary critics to Kafka's, Orwell's, Zamyatin's, and Borges' similar literary inventions.

Mark-Alem is a twenty-something (by the end of the novel, 28) Ottoman Albanian, a descendant of the (real) influential Köprülü family during the period of its greatest dominance. At the idea of his uncle, the Vizier, who holds the position of Foreign Minister, Mark-Alem is offered a job at the mysterious and feared Tabir Sarai, a government office responsible for the study of dreams. Even though inexperienced, on the back of a "recommendation that hangs between menace and patronage ('You suit us ...')", he is hired in the "Selection" section of the Palace, where his obligations include making a longlist of interesting dreams and draft-interpretations of the more striking ones. These are then transferred to the more skillful interpreters in the "Interpretation" section, whose job is to make a shortlist for the master-interpreters at the "Office of the Master Dream", which, using much more than experience and dream dictionaries, chooses and decodes the symbolism of the most emblematic master-dream and relays its message to the Sultan at the end of each week. Since dreams are considered to be messages by God, it is believed that these master-dreams hold the answers to the future of the empire, and can help in averting misfortunes and nullifying possible threats.

As he rapidly climbs – to his own amazement – the hierarchical ladder within the Tabir Sarai in record time, Mark-Alem gradually realizes that the labyrinthine Palace holds many secrets and exerts much more influence than publicly acknowledged, ranging from holding subversive dreamers responsible for the products of their unconsciousness to torturing them and being responsible for the demise of whole families based on dream symbolism – something which, essentially, gives the one who controls the Palace an almost unlimited power. An allusive dream he encounters while still a dream selector will eventually prove to be directly connected with the Köprülüs, supposedly disclosing them as Albanian dissidents within the Ottoman government, and resulting in a bloody clash between the supporters of the Sultan and the Vizier, with the confused Mark-Alem caught in the middle, unaware of the extent of his guilt, responsibilities, and even identity.

In the resolution, one of Mark-Alem's uncles is executed, but his uncle the Vizier and the family survives with increased power; he himself is raised to the head of the Tabir Sarei.

== Censorship ==
In early 1982, due to the novel's obvious allusions to Socialist Albania, in the presence of several members of the Albanian Politburo, including Nexhmije Hoxha and Ramiz Alia, an emergency meeting of the Albanian League of Writers and Artists was called and The Palace of Dreams was expressly and severely condemned. Kadare was accused of attacking the Communist government in a covert manner. At the end of the meeting, Ramiz Alia warned Kadare: "The people and the Party have raised you to Olympus, but if you are not faithful to them, they will cast you into the abyss". Nevertheless, the authorities were reluctant to imprison or purge Kadare, as he had become an internationally recognized literary figure and it would have caused an international backlash, which, given the country's rapid economic decline, the authorities wanted to avoid at all costs.

As a result, the work was banned—but not before 20,000 copies had been sold. Of all his books, it is the one Kadare is most proud of having written.

== Reception ==
According to Jean-Christophe Castelli, writing for Vanity Fair, The Palace of Dreams is "Kadare's most daring novel" and "one of the most complete visions of totalitarianism ever committed to paper." Julian Evans, in a Guardian review, agrees with Castelli, concluding that "if there is a book worth banning in a dictatorship, this is it". A review for Los Angeles Times describes the book as "flawless ... allegory of power", noting that in "its terse geometry, Kadare has introduced a historical and intensely human sadness."

== Translations ==
The Palace of Dreams has been translated into numerous languages. The English translation was made by Barbara Bray from the French version of the Albanian that had been translated by Isuf Vrioni. Other notable translations of the novel include:

- 1990: To palati t ōn oneirōn (Greek; tr. Helene Kekropolou)
- 1991: Palata snova (Serbian; tr. Shkelzen Maliqi)
- 1991: El palau dels somnis (Catalan; tr. Maria Bohigas)
- 1991: Il palazzo dei sogni (Italian; tr. Francesco Bruno)
- 1992: Drömmarnas palats (Swedish; tr. Agneta Westerdahl)
- 1993: O palacio dos sonhos (Portuguese; tr. Bernardo Joffily)
- 1994: 夢宮殿 / Yume kyûden (Japanese; tr. Mituhiko Murakami)
- 1998: Палатата на соништата (Palatata na soništata; Macedonian; tr. Fatbardha Shehu)
- 2003: Az Álmok Palotája: regény (Hungarian; tr. József Takács)
- 2004: El palacio de los sueños (Spanish; tr. Ramon Sanchez Lizarralde)
- 2004: 꿈의궁전 /Kkum ŭi kungjŏn (Korean); tr. 문학동네 /Kyŏnggi-do P'aju-si
- 2005: Het dromenpaleis (Dutch; tr. Jacqueline Sheji)
- 2005: Der Palast der Träume (German; tr. Joachim Röhm)
- 2007: Palatul Viselor (Romanian; tr. Marius Dobrescu)
- 2008: Pałac snów (Polish; tr. Dorota Horodyska )
- 2012: Palača sanj (Slovenian; tr. Luana Maliqi, Maja Novak)
- 2015: 梦宫 / (Meng gong; Chinese; tr. Xing Gao)
- 2015: Kākh-i ruyā'hā (Persian)
- 2016: قصر الاحلام : روايه / Qasr al-aḥlām : riwāyah (Arabic; tr. اسماعيل كاداريه ؛ ترجمه: حياة عطيه الحويك/ Ḥayāh al-Ḥuwayk ʻAṭīyah )
- 2017: Palác snů (Czech; tr. Hana Tomková)
- 2021: Дворец Сновидений (Russian; tr. Vasiliy Tyukhin)

== Adaptation ==
Shirin Neshat, a New York City-based Iranian visual artist, has expressed interest to turn The Palace of Dreams into a film, using the novel to explore "the beautiful parallel" between Albania's "dark history and struggle with Communism and the Iranian plight with the Islamic revolution."

== See also ==
- Albanian literature
- The Blinding Order

== Relevant literature ==
- Morena, Braçaj. "The Transmission of Cultural Expressions in the Language of Translation with the Same Semantic Value in a Literary Text." Revue Européenne du Droit Social 3 (52) (2021): 113-122.
- Perica, Ivana. "The Palace of Dreams / Nënpunësi i pallatit të ëndrrave." CAPONEU Digital Platform
