= The Doll: A Portrait of My Mother =

2015 autobiographical novel by Ismail Kadare

- First edition
- Author: Ismail Kadare
- Translator: John Hodgson
- Set in: Albania and Moscow
- Publisher: Onufri, Harvill Secker
- Publication date: 2015
- English publication date: 2020
- Pages: 208

The Doll: A Portrait of My Mother (Albanian: Kukulla) is an autobiographical novel sketching Albanian author Ismail Kadare's relationship with his mother. It dwells upon the family's life in Gjirokastër and later in Tirana, "full of compelling details of life in a changing Albania", as well as on the author's own time as a student at the Gorky Institute in Moscow. While the portrait of his mother remains insubstantial, there are reflections upon the author's own youthful literary ambitions, and the nature of autocracy.

The work was first published in Albanian in 2015, and was translated into English by John Hodgson for publication by Harvill Secker in 2020.
