= Zekate House =

Coordinates: 40.07484°N 20.13229°E

Zekate House (Albanian: Zapanaja e Zekatëve), is a house in Gjirokastër, Albania. The house was built in 1811–1812 by Beqir Zeko, a local Albanian general administrator in Ali Pasha's government. It is described as "one of the grandest examples of Gjirokastër architecture in the Ottoman style", and as the authentic southern Albanian Tosk type residential housing of the early 19th century wealthy Albanians.

Fortified tower houses, (known as kullë in Albanian), belonged to wealthy people, such as government officials or merchants. All rooms have a basic design: a safe ground floor with a wooden gallery on top, which are the most important rooms for an extended family. The decks are placed on the walls to help defend against the enemies they attack. Zekate's house is an example of an urban kullë. Built in 1811–1812, it has two towers and a large double arch facade. The panorama of the city can be viewed from the house.

== Gallery ==
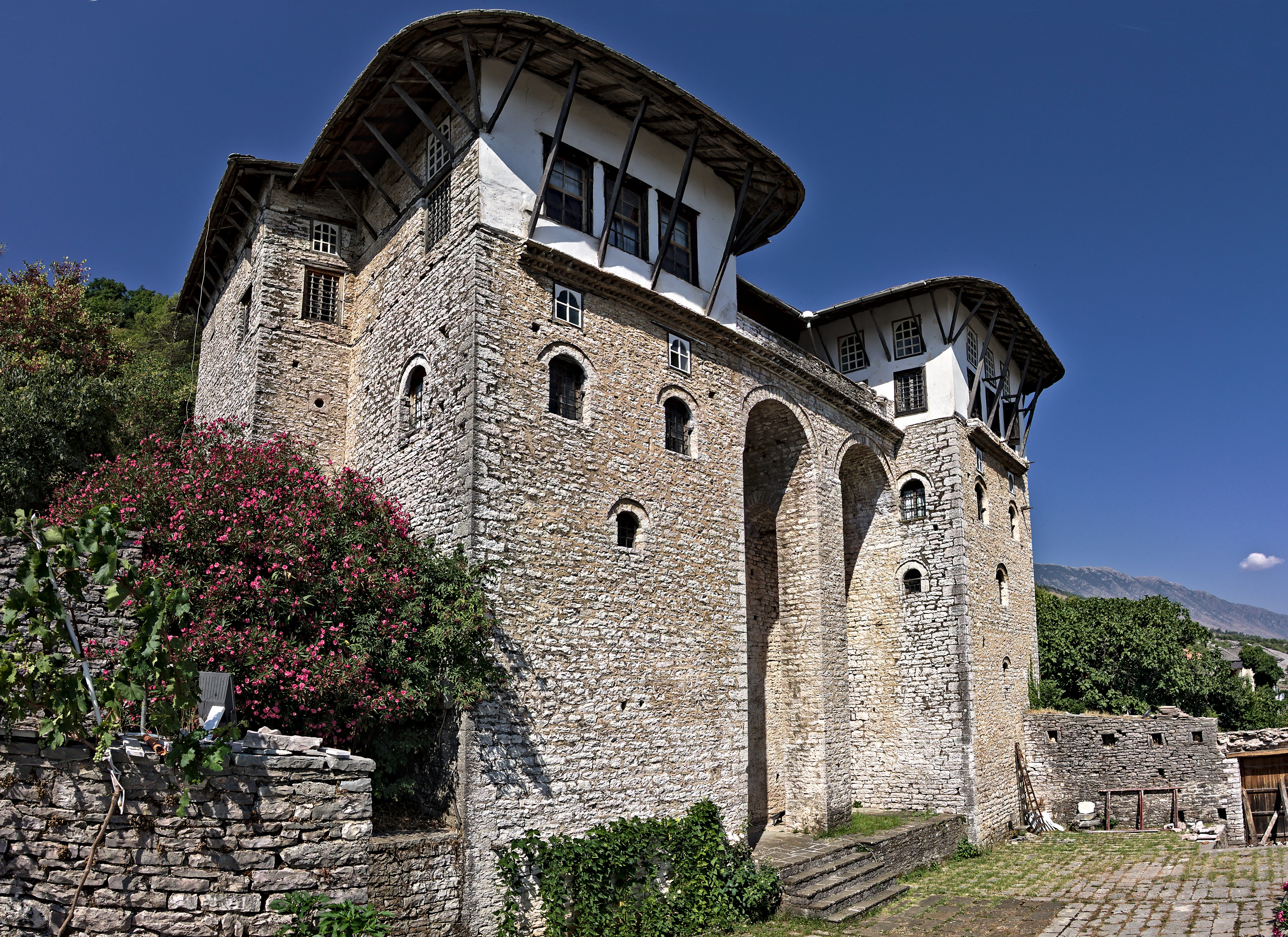
Zekate House

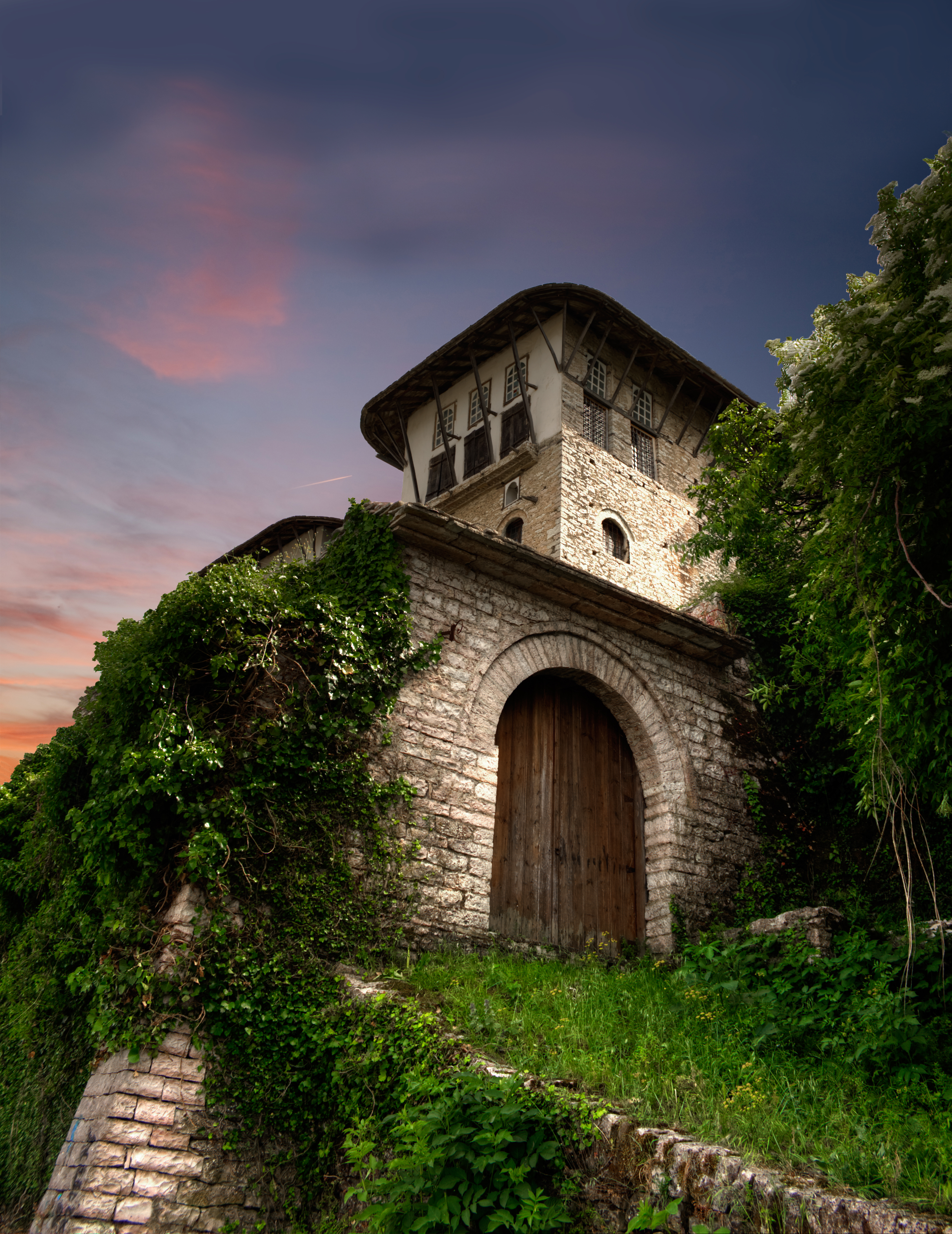
Gate

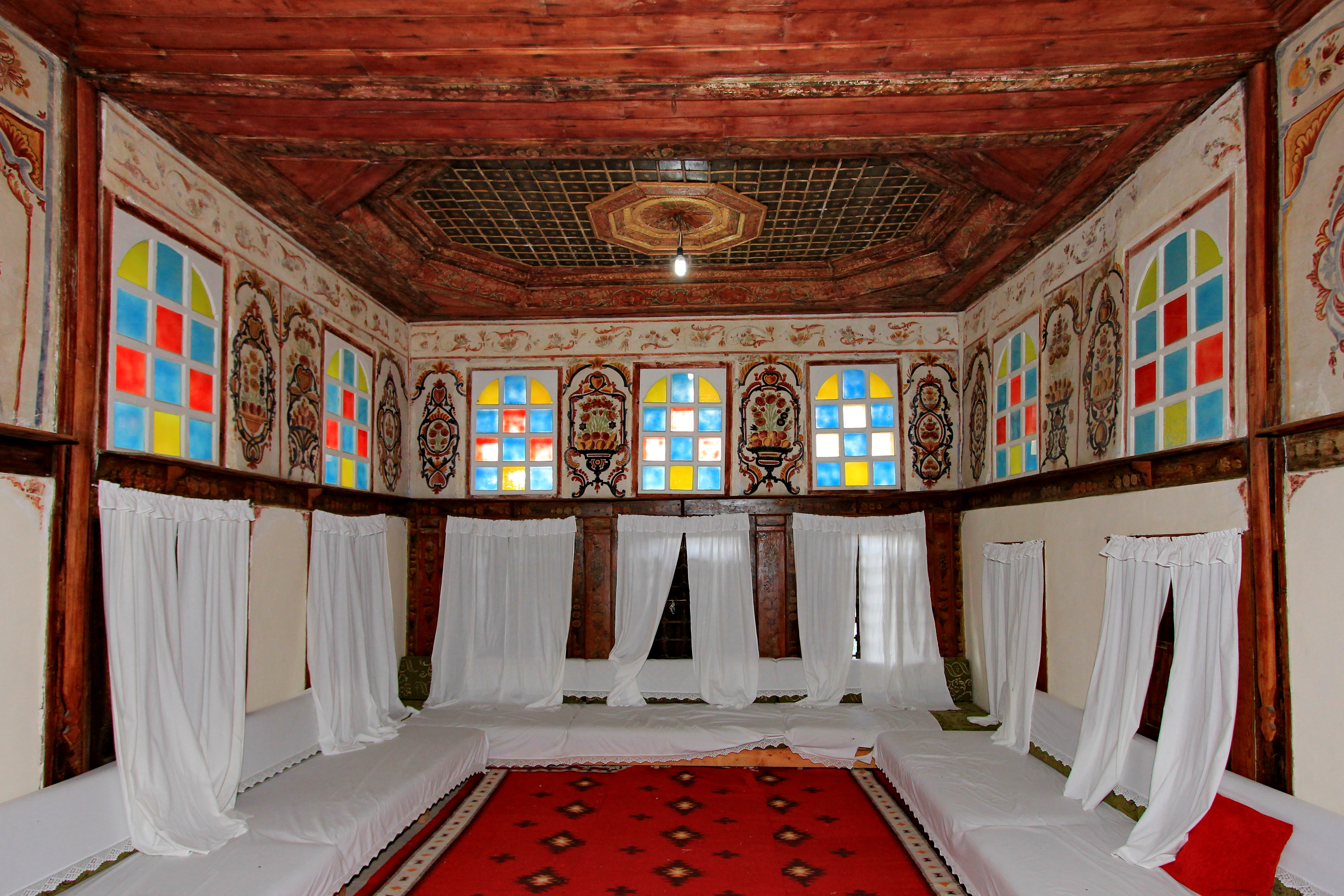
Room

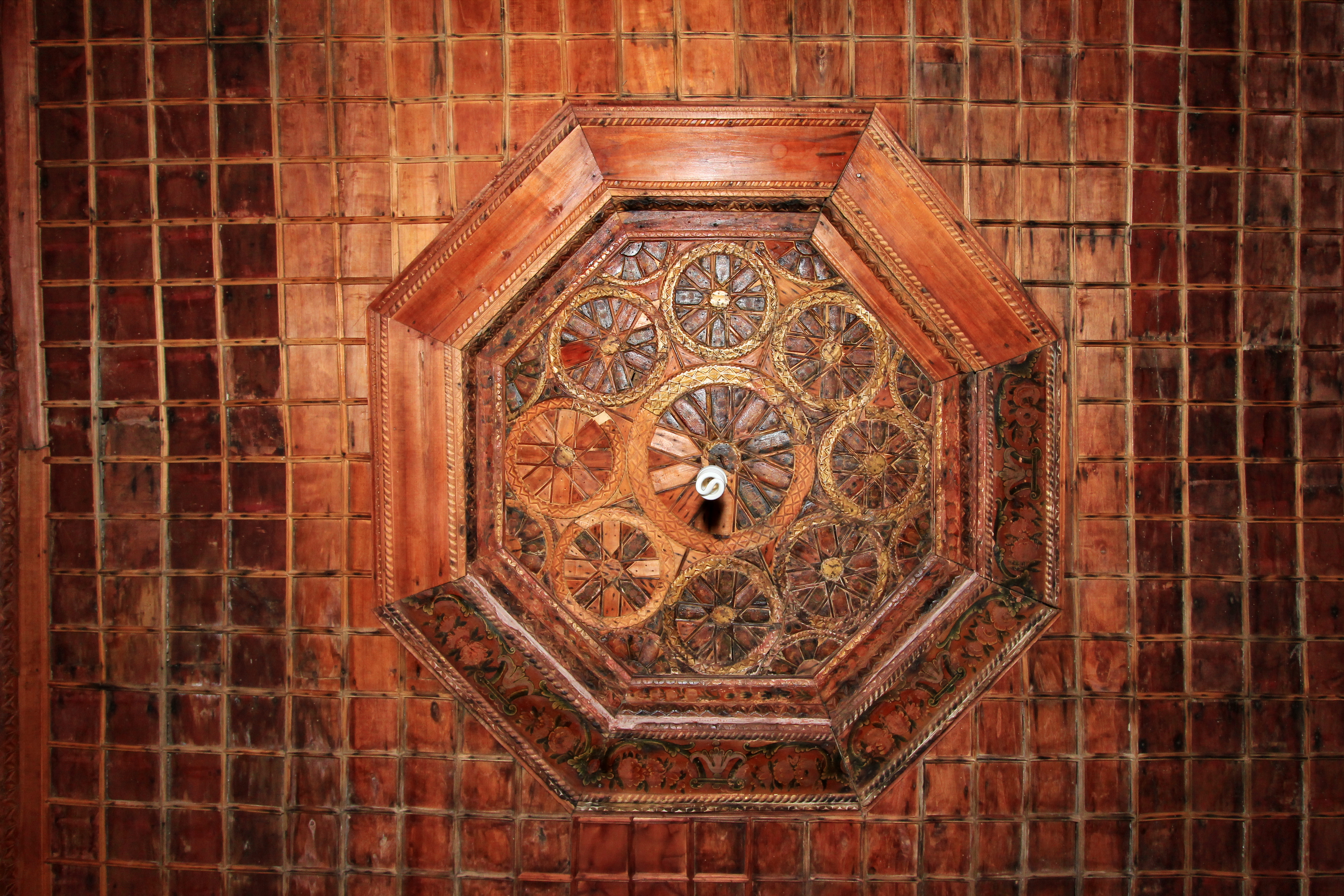
Roof

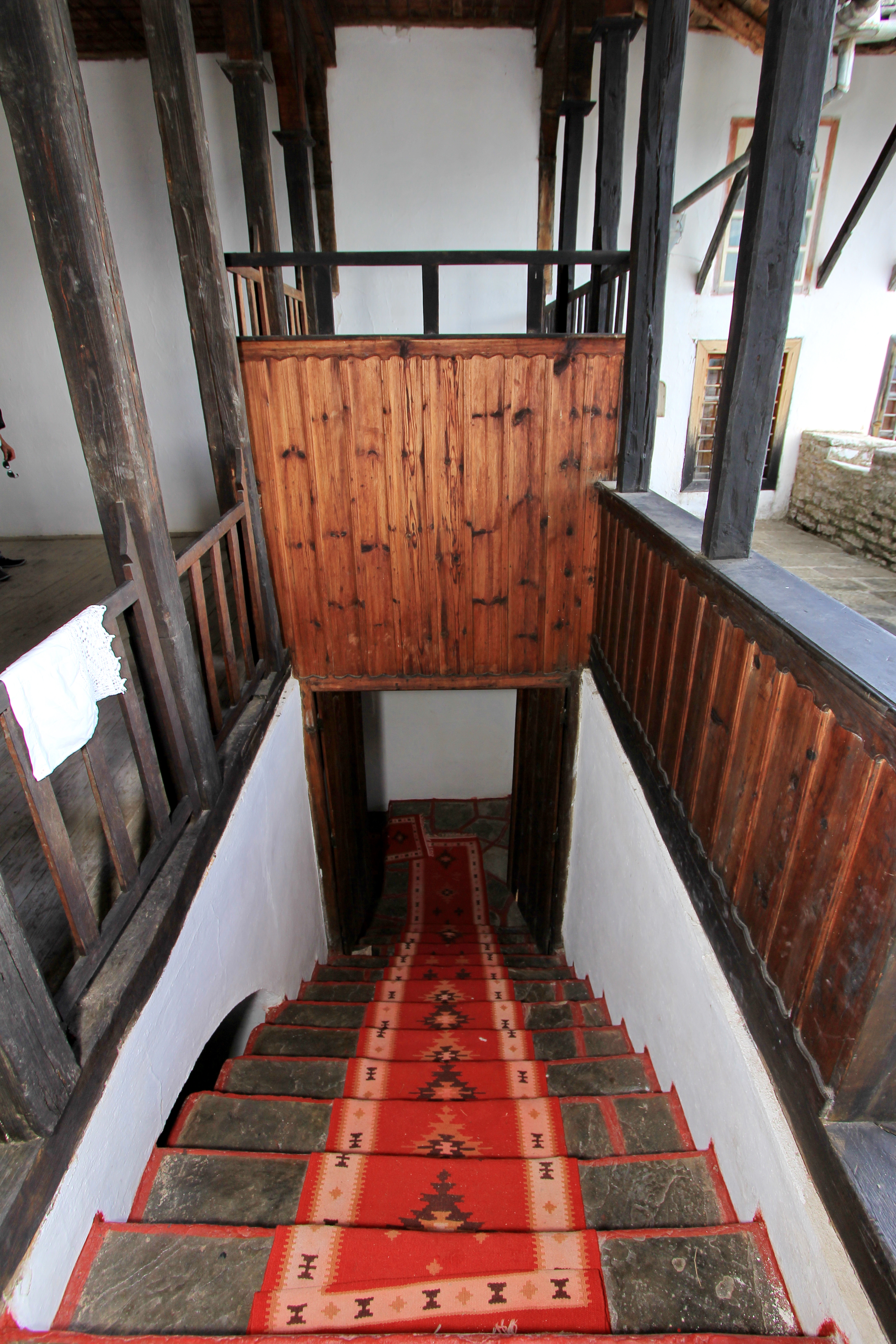
Stairs

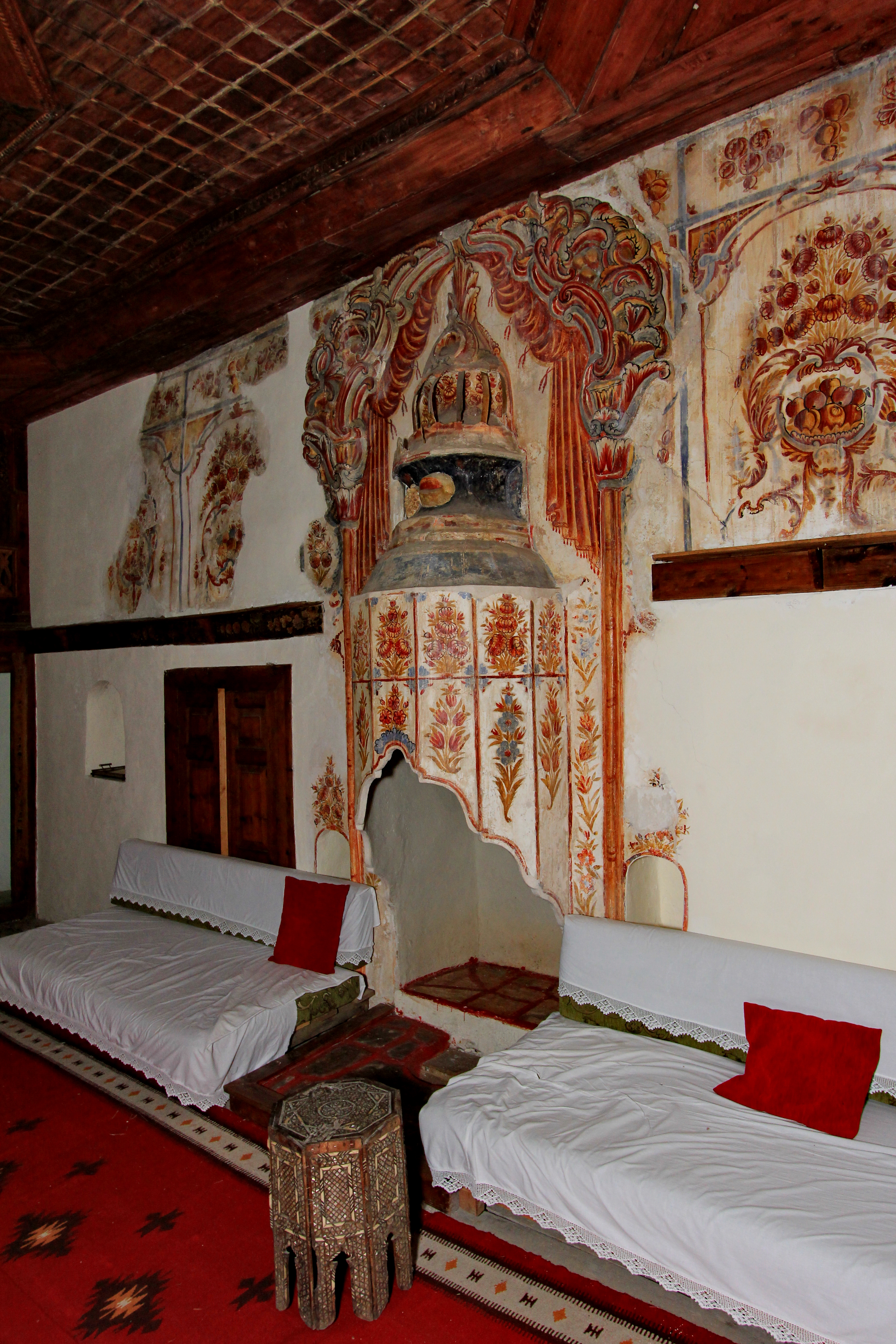
Chimney and audience room

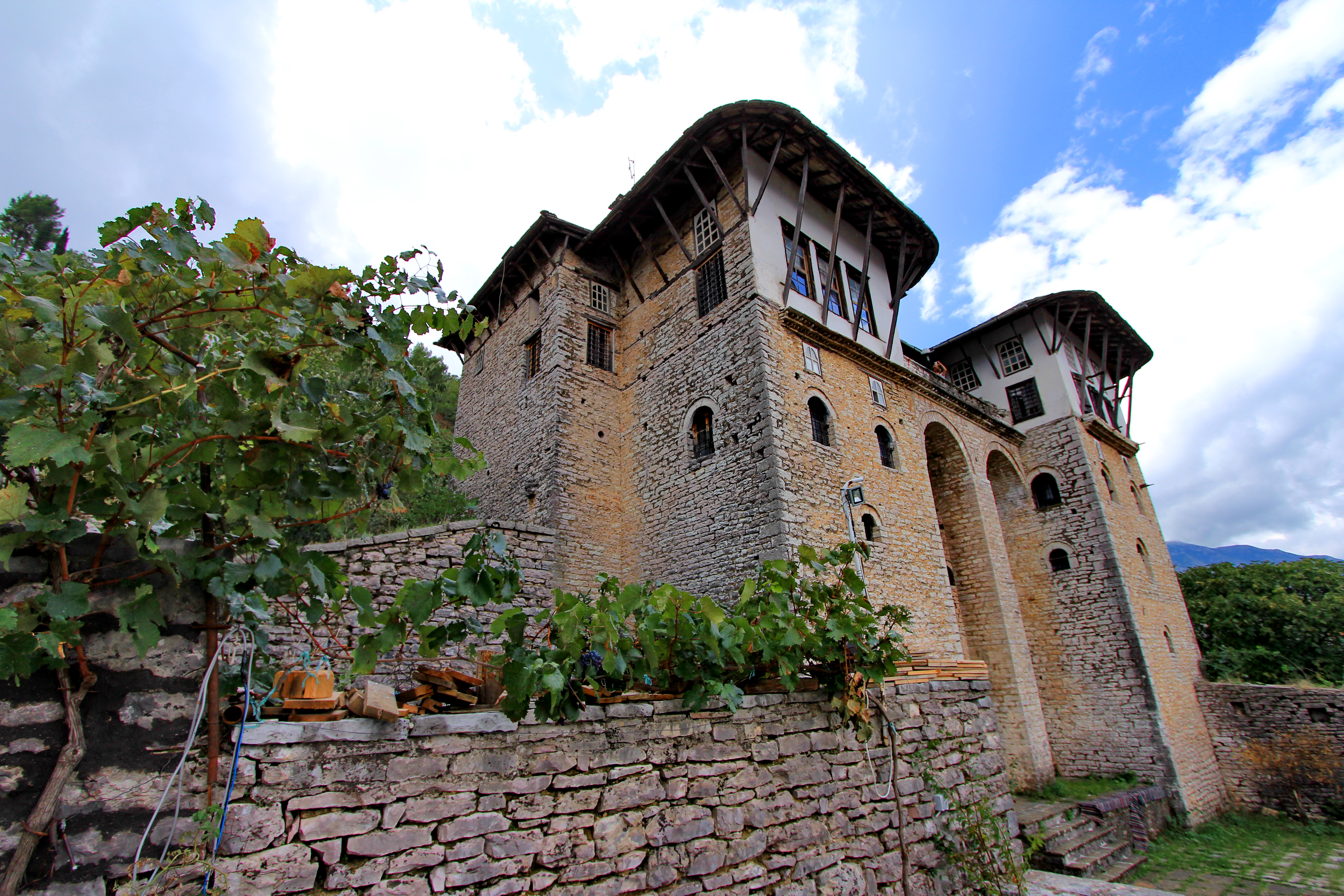
View from outside

== Bibliography ==
- Jaeger-Klein, Caroline (2018). "The Traditional Tower Houses of Kosovo and Albania - Origin, Development and Influences". UBT International Conference. 27.
