= The Siege (Kadare novel) =

1970 novel by Ismail Kadare

- First edition (Albanian)
- Author: Ismail Kadare
- Original title: Kështjella
- Translator: David Bellos
- Language: Albanian
- Genre: Historical novel
- Publisher: Sh.B. Naim Frashëri, Canongate Books
- Publication date: 1970
- Publication place: Albania
- English publication date: 2008
- Pages: (Albania) 304 (United States) 328
- ISBN: 0-8021-4475-6

The Siege is a historical novel by Albanian author Ismail Kadare, first published in 1970 in Tirana as Kështjella (The Castle). It concerns the siege of an unnamed Albanian fortress by troops of the Ottoman Empire during the time of Skanderbeg, loosely based on the historical Siege of Krujë (1450). It was translated into French by Jusuf Vrioni and then from French into English by David Bellos. The novel was partly rewritten by Kadare after he moved from Albania to France in 1990; most of the changes were references to the Christian beliefs of the Albanian garrison, which had been cut from the original version by the communist censors.

== Title ==
Kadare originally intended for the novel to be called Daullet e Shiut ("The Drums of Rain"), but the Albanian publisher changed this to Kështjella ("The Castle"), which was felt to be more heroic and also served to emphasise the role of the Albanian garrison. The original title was revived when the novel was translated for the first time, in 1971, being calqued into French as Les Tambours de la Pluie. However, in Albania it continued to be known as "The Castle", and when it was translated into English for the first time, in 2007, Kadare asked the translator David Bellos to come up with a new title, referring to besiegers and besieged collectively. He alighted upon The Siege, the name by which it has been known ever since.

== Plot summary ==
One summer in the early 1450s, an Ottoman army invades Albania and lays siege to a castle loyal to the charismatic Albanian rebel Skanderbeg. The besieging army vastly outnumbers the beleaguered garrison, and is led by the experienced commander Tursun Pasha, but it is also racked by petty jealousies and rivalries. One of the most profound splits within the Council of War is between the military officers and Islamic mufti, who all favour traditional Turkic methods of war, and its scientific and technical experts, who include the unnamed Quartermaster-General, the gunsmith Saruxha, the physician Sirri Selim and a renegade Christian military architect. Not part of the Council of War, but privy to most of its discussions, is the official campaign chronicler Mevla Çelebi. The majority of the story is told from his point of view, though some chapters instead focus on other members of the Turkish army. Each chapter is followed by a short 'inter-chapter', written in the style of a European mediaeval chronicle, narrating the action from the perspective of the castle garrison.

On the first evening of the siege, the Council of War convenes. Saruxha recommends a lengthy artillery bombardment before any assault is attempted, but the mufti persuades the pasha to order an attack the following day, citing a favourable prediction by one of the army's astrologers. The following afternoon, the Turks mount an assault by escalade upon the castle, but are repulsed with heavy losses.

Concerned at the effect of the failed assault upon his men's morale, Tursun Pasha blames the defeat upon supposed spies within the Turkish army. He also permits the akinji cavalry to raid the surrounding district in order to collect slave-women for the troops. However, the raiders are only able to procure a few dozen unfortunate women to share amongst the thousands of soldiers, who kill them all in a single night in a frenzied gang-rape.

Tursun Pasha adopts the Architect's proposal of digging a tunnel under the walls in order to infiltrate the castle via its dungeons. The Astrologer, scapegoated for the failure of the initial assault, is punished by being assigned to the tunnelling party. The Albanians detect the tunnel and use an explosive charge to collapse its midsection. Trapped in the furthermost section of tunnel, the Astrologer and the other tunnellers slowly asphyxiate over a period of three days.

With the tunnelling plan thwarted, the Turks decide to find and cut the underground aqueduct supplying the garrison with water. The Architect attempts to use scientific methods to locate the aqueduct, but to no avail. The elderly Janissary Corps commander Old Tavxha suggests the traditional trick of using a thirsty horse to sniff out the real aqueduct, and this proves successful. With the aqueduct blocked, the garrison starts to run short of water. The following night, the Turkish camp comes under apparent attack from a relief army led by Skanderbeg, but it is subsequently unclear if an attack did actually take place, or if it was just a spontaneous rumour that led to a general panic.

Tursun Pasha orders another direct assault, this time using bombards to destroy the main gate. However, friendly fire results in the death of numerous Janissaries, and the enraged survivors refuse to continue the assault, which consequently fails. To placate the Janissaries, Tursun Pasha allows them to lynch Saruxha's assistant.

Desperate to bring the siege to an end by whatever means he can, Tursun Pasha decides to try Sirri Selim's controversial idea of releasing diseased animals into the castle. The besiegers successfully release rats onto the battlements during another assault by escalade, but several of the Turkish soldiers handling the animals are themselves infected and subsequently succumb to the disease. Worse still, the Albanian garrison manage to catch all the rats in makeshift traps before they can bite anyone, and so this scheme too ends in failure.

Tursun Pasha makes one final attempt to bring the siege to an end, ordering another assault by escalade. This time he leads the attack in person, but despite his best efforts, the Turks are once again repulsed. That night the autumn rains arrive, replenishing the garrison's water reserves and dashing the besiegers' final hope of forcing the castle to surrender. Tursun Pasha commits suicide by drinking an overdose of sleeping draught.

The Turkish army lifts the siege and retreats eastward. The final chapter follows the concubines of the late pasha's harem, who witness the preparations for the forthcoming Siege of Constantinople.

== Characters ==
The Council of War

- Tursun Pasha (full name: Ugurlu Tursun Tunxhasllan Sert Ollgunsoj): The ageing Turkish general commanding the besieging army. He is aware that he has recently fallen out of favour with the sultan, and that the Albanian expedition represents a final opportunity for him to salvage his reputation; he expects to be executed if he fails.
- The Quartermaster-General: The unnamed officer responsible for the army's provisioning, who befriends Mevla Çelebi. An unusually perceptive man, he realises that the Ottoman campaigns against the Albanians are having the effect of strengthening Albanian nationhood, and thus that even if Albania is eventually reconquered, it will be impossible to keep it subjugated forever. He also reveals to Mevla Çelebi that the traditional Ottoman narrative of Sultan Murad I's heroic death at the Battle of Kosovo Field is a lie, and that the sultan and his son Jakup Bey were actually murdered in a premeditated plot to engineer the accession of his other son, Sultan Bayezid I.
- The Mufti: The senior Islamic cleric attached to the army. He disapproves of Tursun Pasha bringing his harem with him on what is supposed to be a holy war against infidels, and is also disdainful of the 'experts' like Saruxha and the Architect.
- Saruxha: The army's chief gunsmith, who favours a scientific, rational approach to warfare and is frustrated by the mysticism of the Mufti. He replaced the Ottoman Empire's previous chief gunsmith, Sarunhali, after the latter had a crisis of conscience concerning the morality of their profession; by contrast, Saruxha believes that the advance of military science is inexorable and that moral considerations are irrelevant.
- Sirri Selim: The doctor. He proposes introducing disease-ridden rats into the castle in order to incapacitate the garrison.
- Old Tavxha: Commander of the Janissaries, an elderly warrior whose limbs are deformed by rheumatism. He frequently reminisces about tactics used in previous sieges he has witnessed, one of which - the trick of using a thirsty horse to find hidden watercourses - proves useful to the Turkish army.
- The Astrologer: A junior member of the council who attempts to secure advancement by boldly predicting that an immediate assault upon the castle will be successful. Scapegoated for the failure of the attack, he is punished by being assigned to the tunnelling party, and is among the unfortunate men trapped and killed when the tunnel collapses.
- Kurdisxhi: Commander of the Akinjis.
- Kara-Mukbil: Commander of the Azebs.
- The Alaybey: A senior officer tasked by the sultan with observing Tursun Pasha's actions.
- Ulug Bey: Commander of the sappers. He is harshly criticised by Tursun Pasha for burying the Turkish dead from the initial assault in a shallow grave, enabling dogs to unearth the corpses and feed on them. To redeem himself he personally takes charge of the subsequent tunnelling operation, and is among those killed when the tunnel collapses.
- The Architect: A Christian renegade who provides the Ottoman army with plans of the castle and advises the besiegers on the conduct of the siege; the tunnelling plan is his idea. The other members of the council dislike him, and mock his ungrammatical Turkish. He is often referred to as 'the Giaour'. At the end of the novel, Sultan Mehmet II orders him to assist in the planning for the upcoming Siege of Constantinople. As such, it is possible that he is equivalent to the historical Orban.

Tursun Pasha's Harem

- Hasan: The eunuch who manages the harem and is the only man other than the pasha himself allowed to speak to the concubines.
- Lejla: The senior member of the harem, therefore nicknamed 'Nanny'. She was previously the chief concubine of an Ottoman vizier, and is the only member of the harem to have had sex with a man other than Tursun Pasha. She is also the only one of them to have been on campaign before.
- Blondie: A European concubine, presumably of Slavic origin; she is the only one of the girls who does not speak Turkish fluently.
- Ajsel: The only one of the concubines to have borne Tursun Pasha a child (a daughter).
- Exher: The youngest concubine, who falls pregnant on the first night of the camp. Expecting the child to be a boy, Tursun Pasha becomes increasingly concerned with its welfare as his hopes of a successful conclusion to the campaign fade.

Other Turks

- Mevla Çelebi: The campaign chronicler, tasked with producing the official account of the siege. He is acutely conscious of the fact that his work will determine how these events are remembered by posterity. As the point-of-view character in most chapters, he is the effective protagonist of the novel. Of the four men who drink together on the first night of the siege - himself, Tuz Okçan, Sadedin and the Astrologer - he is the only one to survive the siege without being killed or maimed.
- Tuz Okçan: A rank-and-file janissary. He befriends Sadedin, and cares for him after he is blinded. He himself catches an unspecified disease from an infected rat during the attempt to introduce plague into the castle, and dies soon afterward.
- Sadedin: A poet who is enthusiastic about the war, which he hopes will inspire him to write a great work of poetry. He is blinded by burning pitch in the initial assault, and subsequently compared to Homer by the Quartermaster-General.

Albanians

- An unnamed scribe among the Albanian garrison. The entries in his chronicle form short 'inter-chapters' between the longer chapters describing the siege from the Turkish perspective. David Bellos speculates that he is based on the historical Albanian writer Marin Barleti, who wrote a chronicle (De Obsidione Scodrensi) about the 1478 Siege of Shkodra and also a biography of Skanderbeg.
- Vranakonti (Count Vrana): Commander of the Albanian garrison. Historically, he fulfilled the same function at the 1450 Siege of Krujë.
- Skanderbeg, real name Gjergj Kastrioti, leader of the Albanian rebels against the Ottoman Empire. Although he never appears in person in the novel, he is frequently mentioned by other characters, as the Turks are in awe of his fearsome reputation.

== Commentary ==
The Siege was written during the dictatorship of Enver Hoxha, and specifically during the period when the dictator was paranoid about a possible invasion by the Warsaw Pact. As such, the novel can be seen as a simple allegory, celebrating valiant Albanian resistance in the face of a more powerful enemy. Indeed, there are numerous anachronistic elements in the story which seem to allude to the contemporary situation - for example the Quartermaster-General's analysis of the Ottoman campaign in explicitly nationalistic terms, Sirri Selim's understanding of the germ theory of disease and scientific approach to biological warfare, the question of whether it is morally acceptable for scientists to be involved in military research (reflected in Saruxha's story about his mentor Saruhanli), and the concern expressed by Lejla at the very end of the book about a perpetual arms race.

However, in fact the Albanian garrison and Skanderbeg are peripheral characters in the novel, with the bulk of the story being told from the point of view of the besieging Turkish army. Moreover, the internal dynamics of this army are often directly reminiscent of Hoxha's Albania - like the dictator, Tursun Pasha presides over a number of squabbling lieutenants whom he plays off against one another to preserve his own authority, and he uses show-trials and artificial rumours of treachery to keep his army distracted from its defeats; likewise, just as those purged in communist Albania would be sent to hellish work camps, so the underlings whom the pasha scapegoats for the army's failures are sent to toil in "the tunnel". As David Bellos puts it in the afterword to his translation, "All these details make the Ottoman world, ostensibly the very image of Albania's Other, merge into an evocation of the People's Republic [of Albania]...Kadare's Turks are at one and the same time the epitome of what we are not, and a faithful representation of what we have become".

== See also ==
- Albanian literature
- Siege of Krujë (1450)
- Siege of Constantinople (1453)
