= Chronicle in Stone =

1971 novel by Ismail Kadare

- Author: Ismail Kadare
- Original title: Kronikë në gur
- Translator: David Bellos
- Language: Albanian
- Subject: World War II
- Genre: Novel
- Publisher: Canongate (English); Onufri Publishing House (Albanian)
- Publication date: 1971; 1987
- Publication place: Albania
- English publication date: 1987
- Pages: 280; 318
- ISBN: 0-941533-50-6
- OCLC: 44885471

Chronicle in Stone (Albanian: Kronikë në gur) is a novel by Albanian author Ismail Kadare. First published in Albanian in 1971, and translated into English by Arshi Pipa in 1987, it describes life in a small Albanian city during World War II. A revised translation by David Bellos was published in 2007.

== Format and plot ==
Each chapter is followed by an alternate chapter, a short "Fragment of a Chronicle" written by the town's official chronicler. The regular chapters are written in the first person, in the voice of a child, an alter ego of the young Kadare. He is fascinated with words, and reads Macbeth, as Kadare himself did when he was eleven. He applies human drama, imagining blood and crime everywhere. In Kadare's home town, ravaged by history, we see characters walking down the street with severed heads under their arms; the Italian fascists hang several young Albanian rebels, the Greek occupants kill "enemies" chosen according to the whims of their spies, and the Germans indulge in the killing of hundred-year-old women.

Toward the end of the novel, the absurdity of the political situation culminates in a whirlwind-like scenario, in which within two weeks or so, the town changes hands several times: from the Italians to the Greeks, back to the Italians, back to the Greeks, the Italians, the Greeks, until finally no one is in control. Each time the Italians come, they bring along two groups of women, one of nuns and one of prostitutes. Each time the town changes hands, another proclamation by another garrison commander is posted and another flag is raised. Each time another flag is raised, the Albanian Gjergj Pula changes his name to Giorgio (when the Italians come), to Yiorgos (for the Greeks) and to Jürgen Pulen with the arrival of the Germans, a name he never gets a chance to use because the Germans kill him as soon as they enter the town, nor does he get to use "Yogura," which he prepared in case of a Japanese invasion.

== Style ==
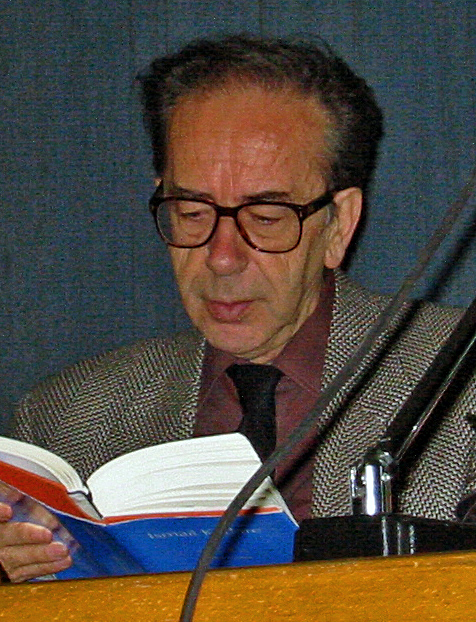
Ismail Kadare at a reading in Zurich.

Readers describe Chronicle in Stone as probably the funniest, and at the same time, most tragic of Kadare's novels because of its flavour, tone, and spectacular events. Kadare depicts a world in which people believe in black magic, women live to be a hundred and fifty, and girls are drowned in wells by their families for having kissed a boy. Its characters, the folklore and mythology infusing historical circumstances are reminiscent of some Caribbean novelists or even post-colonial African storytellers, and readers compare its blend of surreal situations and political drama based on real events to South American novels, although Kadare apparently dislikes the label "magical realism" applied to his novels. As some South American novelists have said, he too could say that the world he describes is not "surreal" or "magical-realist"; it is simply the real, pre-modern world of the Balkans, albeit a world which is universalized through esthetic transfiguration.

== Political context and translation ==
Chronicle in Stone was published in Albania during the years of Enver Hoxha, who came to power with the Communist Party after World War II, and stayed there until his death in the mid-eighties. In this context, we can speculate on the reasons for the episodic appearance toward the end of the novel of a character described by the Italian garrison commander as "the dangerous Communist Enver Hoxha." Since the dictator, like Kadare himself, came from the city of Gjirokaster (which with its steep hillsides and stone streets resembles the city of the book), this aspect of the protagonist's experience is probably authentic. However, government control of the Albanian publishing industry during the Hoxha regime may have provided an incentive for the dictator's inclusion, beyond narrative necessity.

Translated by Arshi Pipa, an Albanian émigré who lived in the United States, the book was initially published in English without the translator's name. Pipa had entered into a conflict with the publisher and/or with the author, and demanded to have his name taken off the translation. Pipa claimed that the several references to homosexuals, and homosexual activity throughout the novel (such as the bisexual Argjir Argjiri and the "woman with a beard," which Pipa takes to mean lesbian) were intended to raise the question of Enver Hoxha's own sexuality, a dangerous claim at the time.

The current edition was translated by David Bellos. He was chosen by Kadare, as he had received a Booker Prize for translation work.

== Reception ==
- “A triumph . . . A beguiling conjunction of realism and fantasy.” —The New York Times Book Review
- “No mere curiosity but a thoroughly enchanting novel–sophisticated and accomplished in its poetic prose and narrative deftness, yet drawing resonance from its roots in one of Europe’s most primitive societies.” —John Updike, The New Yorker
