= An Unexpected Journey =

An Unexpected Journey may refer to:

- An Unexpected Journey (album), a 2013 album by Joker Xue
- The Hobbit: An Unexpected Journey, a 2012 film, part one of the film adaptation of The Hobbit
