= The File on H. =

1981 novel by Ismail Kadare

- Early Albanian edition
- Author: Ismail Kadare
- Original title: Dosja H
- Language: Albanian
- Genre: Novel
- Publication date: 1981
- Publication place: Albania
- Media type: Print (hardback and paperback)
- Pages: 208
- ISBN: 978-1-55970-401-4 (English translation)
- OCLC: 37322387
- Dewey Decimal: 891/.9913 21
- LC Class: PG9621.K3 D66713 1998

The File on H. is a novel by the Albanian author Ismail Kadare. It was first published in Albanian in 1981 under the title Dosja H. Jusuf Vrioni translated the work to French in 1989 (revised in 1996) as Le Dossier H. David Bellos translated the French version into English in 1996. Both Kadare and Bellos have received praise in the English speaking world for the edition.

The premise of the novel is loosely based on the research on the Homeric question done by Milman Parry and Albert Lord in the 1930s, where they helped to develop the theory of Oral-Formulaic Composition.

== Themes ==
The File on H. follows the journey of two Irish-American scholars from Harvard University to a small town in Northern Albania known as N—. Armed with a then-state-of-the-art tape recorder, the scholars set out to the uncover the centuries-long mystery of how Homeric epics came to be, believing that the rhapsodies of the Albanian highlanders hold the answer, as they are thought to be the last known host of oral epic poetry unmuddied by modern society. Their mission is ultimately hindered by the political and ethnic tensions between the Albanians and the Serbs. The obtuse authorities of N— mistake the scholars as spies from the onset, and conduct extensive investigations in hope of discovering the scholars' true intentions. The novel is filled with elements of Albanian history as well as racial and interpersonal struggles in a setting filled with blundering, self-serving officials and blind loyalty to an inefficient government using the interwar Albanian Kingdom as proxy to the totalitarian rule of Enver Hoxha post WWII.

== Plot ==
The story opens with news reaching the Albanian Ministry of the Interior that two American-Irish scholars, Max Ross and Bill Norton, have applied for visas to their country. The Albanian officials are extremely suspicious, seeing that the foreigners are equipped with extensive maps and plans, some rough training in the Albanian language and geography, as well as a novel contraption, the tape recorder. The governor's wife, however, finds her day-to-day life boring and monotonous, so she is excited to learn that they will be having visitors.

Upon arriving, Ross and Norton are immediately trailed by Dull Baxhaja, a diligent and loyal spy at the governor's behest. Dull tracks their every move, and despite not understanding English, is able to recall everything he observes perfectly. Ross and Norton are invited to dinner with many of the notable individuals of N—, including the governor, the soap-maker, the postmaster, and their wives. During dinner, the foreigners tell the governor that they are Homeric scholars, but show reservation in explaining the details of their quest. The governor becomes certain that the two are spies because of this. Meanwhile, Dull begins his first of several detailed reports for the governor. He conducts interviews, searches the foreigners' luggage, makes photocopies of their journal entries, and creates a hideout in the attic above their hotel room to surveil them. Receiving the report late that night, the governor learns that the scholars' desire to make a "Homeric discovery'' would lead to fame and recognition for them back home, and that their secretive nature was to ensure they could be the ones to claim such a discovery. Mistaking the references to Homeric poetry as a code for some espionage target, the governor is now certain the two are spies.

Ross and Norton leave the town of N— and head to Buffalo Inn. Situated at a crossroads near the base of the mountains in the North, the inn is a common resting place for traveling highlanders, making it an ideal location to intercept wandering bards. Realizing that their task would be significantly more difficult without the help of at least one local, the two confide their plan to the innkeeper, Shtjefen. He tells the scholars that although bards still wander through occasionally, their numbers are dwindling as of late. He also introduces them to the poor ethnic relations between the Albanians and the Serbs, explaining that the two peoples have fought for thousands of years, and both believe themselves to be the original inhabitants of the land. Both groups would vie to be considered the culture of origin of oral epic poetry.

Before long a group of highlanders passes through the inn with a bard among them. He agrees to be recorded while he performs for the scholars twice; the first time traveling south, and the second time a fortnight later, returning to his home. Although the first bard's return was delayed, the scholars eventually manage to record several bards performing over different periods of time. The two scholars are excited to discover slight alterations in the wording between performances, supporting their hypothesis of the origins of epic poetry.

Their work goes on for weeks, and they continue to document their findings on oral poetry. They also study the relationship between Albanian and Serbian oral poetry, and conclude that the two styles are closely related, though Albanian is considered to be the original of the two. Still, they struggle to find conclusive evidence of their theories. Meanwhile different events happen around the inn: A young stonemason was brought in on a stretcher with a severe disease. Shtjefan explains that the most likely cause was someone accidentally walling in his shadow while constructing. Just then, they meet a suspicious Serbian monk named Dushan. He tells Ross and Norton that he's heard of the research they're conducting, and in particular asks if they're also studying Serbian epic poetry. The two tell the monk that they are only focused on Albanian poetry, in order to avoid unnecessarily entering a conflict. The monk is envious of the service they are giving the Albanian people, but remains civil and leaves on friendly terms. The two continue their work, and while they struggle for many weeks, eventually seem to feel that they've successfully made connections between the Albanian epics and the ancient Greek stories.

The story then returns to Dull's reports to the governor. The governor reads that Dull observed Dushan returning to the inn, pacing and nervous, though not establishing contact with the scholars. Instead, he makes off without his horse to a place called Screech Owl's Cavern, where Frok the Hermit is known to take refuge. Dull follows Dushan and listens to the conversation between Dushan and Frok, learning that the two were infuriated by the scholars' tape recorder, and were preparing to take action. The governor also learns that the government will be sending an English-speaking informer to aid in the espionage. Daisy overhears that the two are being watched and becomes distraught. Around then, Dull sends in a surprise letter of resignation because he fell asleep on the job, missing an entire interaction between his targets and an unknown woman. Daisy had attempted to make contact and warn the two scholars of the spy, but her plan failed. She then makes contact with the new spy, and suddenly has intercourse with him.

The next day, the governor gets an urgent call that the two scholars have been attacked; witnesses recount that Dushan and Frok broke into the inn, smashed the tape recorder to pieces, and tore up all of the recordings and notes for the project. Ross and Norton are physically safe, but have lost everything. Dejected, they start their journey home empty handed.

== Characters ==
- Bill Norton: One of the Irish-American scholars. He has worsening vision due to glaucoma, a reference to the thematic loss of vision in the story of Homer and other poets. Although he can be considered the "leader" of the two, they act as equals, Kadare often referring to them as "acting as one man".
- Max Ross: One of the two scholars. A post-doc at Harvard University, he settled in New York after emigrating from Ireland. He was invited as the sole companion of Bill Norton to travel to Albania in search of the methods in which Homeric epics are created.
- The governor: The head of the government in N— and main antagonist. He and the Minister of the Interior - the two heads of government in the novel - are some of the only two individuals to lack a name. He acknowledges that the area of N— is devoid of points of interest for a potential spy, but is entirely certain that the Americans are committing espionage, and dreams that their prosecution will lead to his political success and renown. He is extremely jealous over his wife. He is infertile, and feels extremely guilty that his wife cannot bear children because of it, and as a result constantly fears that others are trying to impregnate her.
- Daisy: The wife of the governor. In the beginning of the novel, she seems to have depression due to the monotonous nature of her life in N—. Her troubles are worsened by her childless marriage. Upon learning of the two visitors, she becomes very excited, dreaming of erotic fantasies with them. Though the two scholars are uninterested in her advances, she ends up having an affair with a spy from the capitol after he claims to have already seen her naked.
- Dull Baxhaja: The governor's local spy. He is an intellectual, a wordsmith, and a keen observer. Hidden in the attic of the Buffalo Inn, he writes extensive daily reports for the governor, though is limited by his inability to understand English. The relationship between Dull and the governor as an attack on the structure of totalitarian government has been compared to the comedic works of Gogol.
- Shtjefen: the innkeeper of Buffalo Inn. He is warm and accommodating to his guests. He educates Ross and Norton on some of the culture and geopolitics of the area. He even aids in their research endeavors by communicating to the highlanders for them.
- Mr. Rrok: Owner of the soap factory of N—, the only industrial endeavor in the town. He is presented as a very dim-witted, thoughtless individual.
- Dushan: A Serbian monk who overhears Ross and Norton's research plans. Learning that the two plan on only giving Albania credit for the origins of Homeric poetry, he becomes enraged and plans to destroy the research. He is representative of the hostile relations between the Albanians and the Serbs, underlining the fierce competition between the two people to be considered the "original" inhabitants of the Balkan Peninsula.
- Frok: a hermit living in Screech Owl's Cavern for several years. He is known to the people in the surrounding villages to be somewhat of a lunatic. He aids Dushan in destroying the tape recorder. As an old hermit, he is angered that the two scholars are trapping the voices of the bards inside a machine, believing that to be an ill-omen.

== Critical reception ==
Although the English reprinting after 2005 of The File on H. bears the emblem as winner of The Man Booker International Prize 2005, the judging system prior to 2016 was designed such that authors earned the award on the merit of the full body of their work, not an individual novel. Furthermore, all of Kadare's literary awards have been for his merit as an author and scholar rather than for any single piece. Thus, The File on H. has not received any individual literary awards. Still, critics generally praised the book:

- In the Dec. 15, 1997, issue of Kirkus Reviews, the book received massive anonymous praise, applauding Kadare's "Masterly...use...of Albanian folk beliefs," and calling the novel "one of [Kadare's] most unusual and attractive books." They also complimented Bellos' translation of the work, calling it beautiful and graceful.
- The Los Angeles Times included the novel in their list of best fiction of 1998. Richard Eder wrote that the book is "as satiric and absurd as something by the early Evelyn Waugh or Lawrence Durrell."
- Kate Saunders wrote for The Sunday Times that "the originality shines through the many layers," and that it alluded to Gogolian comedy.
- Many other independent book reviews found the novel to be an enjoyable read.

Though there were also some criticisms. Publishers Weekly was unfond of the translation, saying Bellos' secondhand work contained "many infelicities." Ken Kalfus for the New York Times wrote that the novel was "Among the least successful of Kadare's works. Lazily plotted [and] stylelessly written." Kalfus criticized not only the novel and the translation, but also Kadare's attitude towards Albanian politics, citing that Kadare has shown open disapproval for communist-nationalist doctrine, and that the novel promotes pro-Albanian, anti-Serb, and anti-Slav rhetoric. Heather McRobie wrote in 2009 that "Such criticisms are hardly helped by Kadare's very honest admission that he never considered himself a dissident." She noted, though, that while several media outlets have mislabeled him as such, it shouldn't take away from his writing ability. Erica Weitzman, in a more neutral approach, noted in The File on H.'s journal article in The Modern Language Review that some have criticized Kadare's choice to adapt Parry and Lord's work in modern-day Bosnia and Herzegovina and relocate the setting to Albania as "blatant political tendentiousness, if not outright lies and propaganda."

== Bibliography ==
- Kadare, Ismail (2013). The File on H. Arcane Publishing. ISBN 978-1-61145-799-5
- Weitzman, Erica (2016). "Ismail Kadare's The File on H. and the Comedy of Epic". The Modern Language Review. 111 (3): 818–839. doi:10.5699/modelangrevi.111.3.0818 ISSN 0026-7937
- Kalfus, Ken (1 March 1998). "Balkanizing Homer: An Albanian Novel Raises Questions About the Greek Epics". The New York Times.
- "THE FILE ON H.: Kirkus Review". Kirkus Reviews. 1 February 1998.
- "THE FILE ON H." Publishers Weekly. 2 February 1998.
- "The Best Fiction of 1998." The Los Angeles Times. 13 Dec 1998.
- McRobie, Heather. "Ismail Kadare doesn't need to be dissident to be good." The Guardian
- Saunders, Kate (09-16-2006). "Fiction in Short". The Sunday Times. Retrieved 11-19-2023
