= The Concert (novel) =

1988 novel by Ismail Kadare

- First edition
- Author: Ismail Kadare
- Original title: Koncert në fund të dimrit
- Language: Albanian
- Genre: Historical
- Set in: Albania
- Publisher: Naim Frashëri Publishing House
- Publication date: 1988
- Publication place: Albania
- Pages: 556 pages

The Concert is a 1988 historical novel by Ismail Kadare. Originally titled Koncert në fund të dimrit (transl. The Concert in the End of Winter) in Albanian, the novel treats the events leading to the break in Albanian-Chinese diplomatic relations in the period 1972–1978.
