= Doruntine (novel) =

Literary work

- The cover of the book, published by Onufri publishing house
- Author: Ismail Kadare
- Original title: Kush e solli Doruntinën
- Language: Albanian
- Genre: Fiction, drama, thriller
- Publisher: 1980 by Naim Frasheri, Tirana
- Publication date: 1980
- Publication place: Albania
- English publication date: 1995 by Saqi Books
- Pages: 180
- ISBN: 99927-53-89-7

Doruntine or Who brought Dorontine (originally in Albanian: Kush e solli Doruntinën) is a novel by Albanian writer Ismail Kadare. It is based on the old Albanian legend of Constantin and Doruntine.

== Plot ==
Doruntine is a young Albanian woman from a noble family – the Vranachs – who is married into a family that lives far away from the family home. Her brother, Constantine, made an oath to his mother that he would fetch her back if needed. Having heard nothing for three years, Doruntine is one day suddenly awoken by Constantine and taken back on horseback to her mother. He leaves her at the door, saying that he has to go to the church beforehand. When her mother opens the door, both women fall into a state of shock, as Constantine has been dead for three years. Both tell their tale but both die soon after. Stres, the local police chief, is given the task of investigating.

== Reception ==
The book received international positive reviews praising Kadare's writing style and story-telling abilities.

"A master storyteller. He has a knack like Isak Dinesen's for creating a long-ago atmosphere for a story essentially timeless.'" (Chicago Tribune).

Alain Bosquet wrote a positive review praising the book:"The great modern Albanian writer, Ismail Kadare, has given us a masterpiece, Doruntine, at once romantic and contemporary in spirit. Here is a spell-binding new literary mode, with its suspense, its alertness, its suggestiveness, its intensely local flavor—an age-old legend transformed into a splendid fable".

== See also ==
- Albanian folk beliefs
- Albanian literature
- Besa (Albanian culture)
- Constantin and Doruntinë
