= Accident (disambiguation) =

An accident is an unintended, normally unwanted event that was not deliberately caused by humans.

Accident or accidents may also refer to:

== Principal word senses ==
- Accident (philosophy), the counterpart of essence; traits existing nonessentially
- Accident (fallacy), a general rule improperly applied to an exceptional case
- Accident (geology), a sudden discontinuity of ground

== People ==
- Accident, a person born from an unintended pregnancy (the term is used in both derogatory and nonderogatory ways)

== Places ==
- Accident, Maryland, a town in the United States of America

== Arts, entertainment, and media ==
=== Film ===
- Accident (1928 film) (Polizeibericht Überfall), a German film directed by Ernö Metzner
- Accident (1967 film), a British film directed by Joseph Losey, with a screenplay by Harold Pinter based on the novel by Nicholas Mosley
- Accident (1976 film), a Romanian film directed by Sergiu Nicolaescu
- Accident (1985 film), a Kannada film directed by Shankar Nag
- Accident (2008 film), an Indian film directed by Ramesh Aravind
- Accident (2009 film), a Hong Kong film directed by Soi Cheang
- Accident (2012 film), a Bengali film directed by Nandita Roy & Shiboprosad Mukherjee
- Accident (2013 film), a Nigerian film directed by Teco Benson
- Accident, a 2017 South African film starring Roxane Hayward

=== Literature ===
- Accident (Mosley novel), a 1965 novel by writer Nicholas Mosley, later adapted into the film, Accident (1967)
- Accident (novel), a 1994 novel by Danielle Steel

=== Music ===
- Accident, a 1982 album by British bass guitarist and composer John Greaves
- "Accident", a song by Saint Etienne from Reserection EP, later remixed as "He's on the Phone"
- "Accidents", a song by Thunderclap Newman from Hollywood Dream
- "Accidents", a song by Alexisonfire from Watch Out!

=== Television ===
- "Accident" (Bottom episode), an episode of 1990s British sitcom Bottom
- "Accident", an episode of the British sitcom Only When I Laugh

== See also ==
- The Accident (disambiguation)
