= The Three-Arched Bridge =

1978 novel by Ismail Kadare

The Three Arched Bridge
- Arcade Publishing, 2005
- Author: Ismail Kadare
- Original title: Ura Me Tri Harqe
- Translator: John Hodgson
- Language: Albanian
- Publisher: Skyhorse Publisher
- Publication date: 1978
- Publication place: Albania
- Pages: 176
- ISBN: 1611452791

The Three Arched Bridge (Albanian: Ura me tri harqe) is a 1978 novel by Albanian author Ismail Kadare. The story concerns a very old Albanian legend written in verses, the "Legjenda e Rozafes". The book differs from the original legend, as the legend calls for a castle that is being built, not a bridge.

== Plot ==
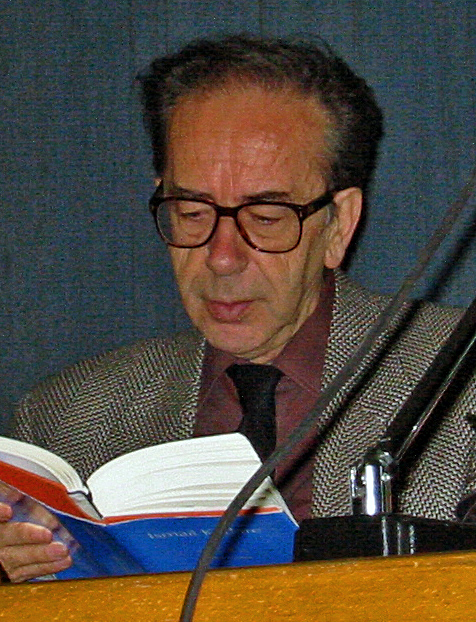
Ismail Kadare

The book is a political parable that describes the construction of an important bridge on the Via Egnatia in Albanian territory in the Balkans from 1377–1378, shortly before the occupation by the Ottoman Empire began.

Told by an Albanian Catholic monk, Gjon (a name used by Northern Albanians who were mostly Catholic prior to Turkish invasions), the story of the bridge, as seen by Gjon is filled with prissy, unhappy bureaucrats, who take the events at face value without ever trying to understand the larger forces at work. Both the river Ujana e Keqe and the bridge itself are major characters in the book, and they undergo significant transformations.

One of the startling events of the book is when a "volunteer" is immured inside the bridge in order to make a "sacrifice" to the river. The man's face is captured in the plaster that surrounds him, as unforgettable as it is horrifying. Though clearly a punishment for the crime of sabotage against the bridge, as Gjon recounts this event, it is less an act of vengeance than it is a true sacrifice. But more than that, it becomes a symbol for the ignorance of and squabbling among tiny Albanian principalities and their fight amongst one another, in front of a major threat.

The New York Times called the novel "an utterly captivating yarn: strange, vivid, ominous, macabre and wise."

== See also ==
- Albanian literature
- Rozafa Castle
