= Ismail Kadare =

Albanian writer (1936–2024)

Ismail Kadare DFK NK
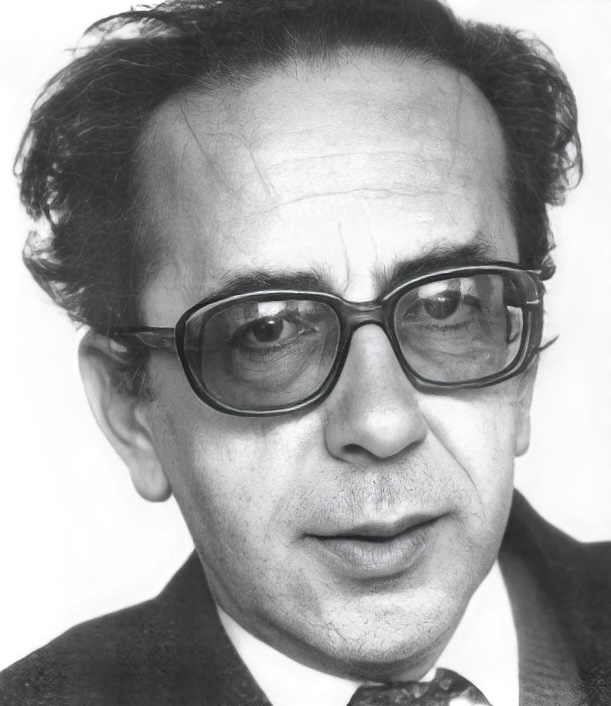
- Kadare in c. 1990s
- Born: 28 January 1936; Gjirokastër, Kingdom of Albania
- Died: 1 July 2024 (aged 88); Tirana, Albania
- Citizenship: Albania; France; Kosovo
- Education: University of Tirana; Maxim Gorky Literature Institute
- Occupations: Novelist, poet, essayist, screenwriter, playwright
- Spouse: Helena Gushi
- Children: 2, including Besiana
- Parents: Halit Kadare; Hatixhe Dobi
- Relatives: Hoxhë Dobi (Great Grandfather)
- Writing career
- Period: 1954–2020
- Genres: Subjective realism, dystopia, satire, parable, myth, fable, folk-tale, allegory, and legend.
- Subjects: Albanian history, Albanian folk beliefs, Communism, Ottoman Empire, Totalitarianism
- Notable works: The General of the Dead Army; The Siege; Chronicle in Stone; The Palace of Dreams; The File on H.; The Pyramid; Spiritus; The Fall of the Stone City
- Notable awards: Prix mondial Cino Del Duca; 1992; Man Booker International Prize; 2005; Prince of Asturias Award; 2009; Jerusalem Prize; 2015; Order of Legion of Honour; 2016; Park Kyong-ni Prize; 2019; Neustadt International Prize for Literature; 2020

Ismail Kadare (Albanian: [ismaˈil kadaˈɾe]; 28 January 1936 – 1 July 2024) was an Albanian novelist, poet, essayist, screenwriter and playwright. He was a leading international literary figure and intellectual, focusing on poetry until the publication of his first novel, The General of the Dead Army, which made him famous internationally.

Kadare is regarded by some as one of the greatest writers and intellectuals of the 20th and 21st centuries, and as a universal voice against totalitarianism. Living in Albania during a time of strict censorship, he devised stratagems to outwit Communist censors who had banned three of his books, using devices such as parable, myth, fable, folk-tale, allegory, and legend, sprinkled with double-entendre, allusion, insinuation, satire, and coded messages. In 1990, to escape the Communist regime and its Sigurimi secret police, he defected to Paris. From the 1990s he was asked by both major political parties in Albania to become a consensual President of the country, but declined. In 1996, France made him a foreign associate of the Académie des Sciences Morales et Politiques, and in 2016, he was a Commandeur de la Légion d'Honneur recipient.

Kadare was nominated for the Nobel Prize in Literature 15 times. In 1992, he was awarded the Prix mondial Cino Del Duca; in 1998, the Herder Prize; in 2005, the inaugural Man Booker International Prize; in 2009, the Prince of Asturias Award of Arts; and in 2015, the Jerusalem Prize. He was awarded the Park Kyong-ni Prize in 2019, and the Neustadt International Prize for Literature in 2020. His nominating juror for the Neustadt Prize wrote: "Kadare is the successor of Franz Kafka. No one since Kafka has delved into the infernal mechanism of totalitarian power and its impact on the human soul in as much hypnotic depth as Kadare." His writing has also been compared to that of Nikolai Gogol, George Orwell, Gabriel García Márquez, Milan Kundera, and Balzac. His works have been published in 45 languages. The New York Times wrote that he was a national figure in Albania comparable in popularity perhaps to Mark Twain in the United States, and that "there is hardly an Albanian household without a Kadare book".

He was the husband of author Helena Kadare and the father of United Nations Ambassador and UN General Assembly Vice-president Besiana Kadare. In 2023 he was granted citizenship of Kosovo, by president Vjosa Osmani.

== Early life and education ==
Ismail Kadare was born on 28 January 1936, in the Kingdom of Albania during the reign of King Zog I. He was born in Gjirokastër, a historic Ottoman fortress–city in the mountains, made up of tall stone houses in what is today southern Albania, a dozen miles from the border with Greece. He lived there on a crooked, narrow street known as Lunatics' Lane.

Ismail's parents were Halit Kadare, a post office employee, and Hatixhe Dobi, a homemaker, who had married in 1933 when she was 17. On his mother's side, his great-grandfather was a Bejtexhi of the Bektashi Order, known as Hoxhë Dobi. Though he was born into a Muslim family, he was an atheist.

Three years after Kadare was born, Italian Prime Minister Benito Mussolini's troops invaded Albania and ousted the king. Italian rule followed. He was nine years old when the Italian troops were withdrawn, and the communist-led People's Socialist Republic of Albania was established.

Kadare attended primary and secondary schools in Gjirokastër. He then studied Languages and Literature at the Faculty of History and Philology of the University of Tirana. In 1956, he received a teacher's diploma. He received further education at Gorky Institute of World Literature in Moscow before returning to Tirana in 1960. He lived in Tirana until moving to France in 1990.

== Literary career ==
=== Early ===
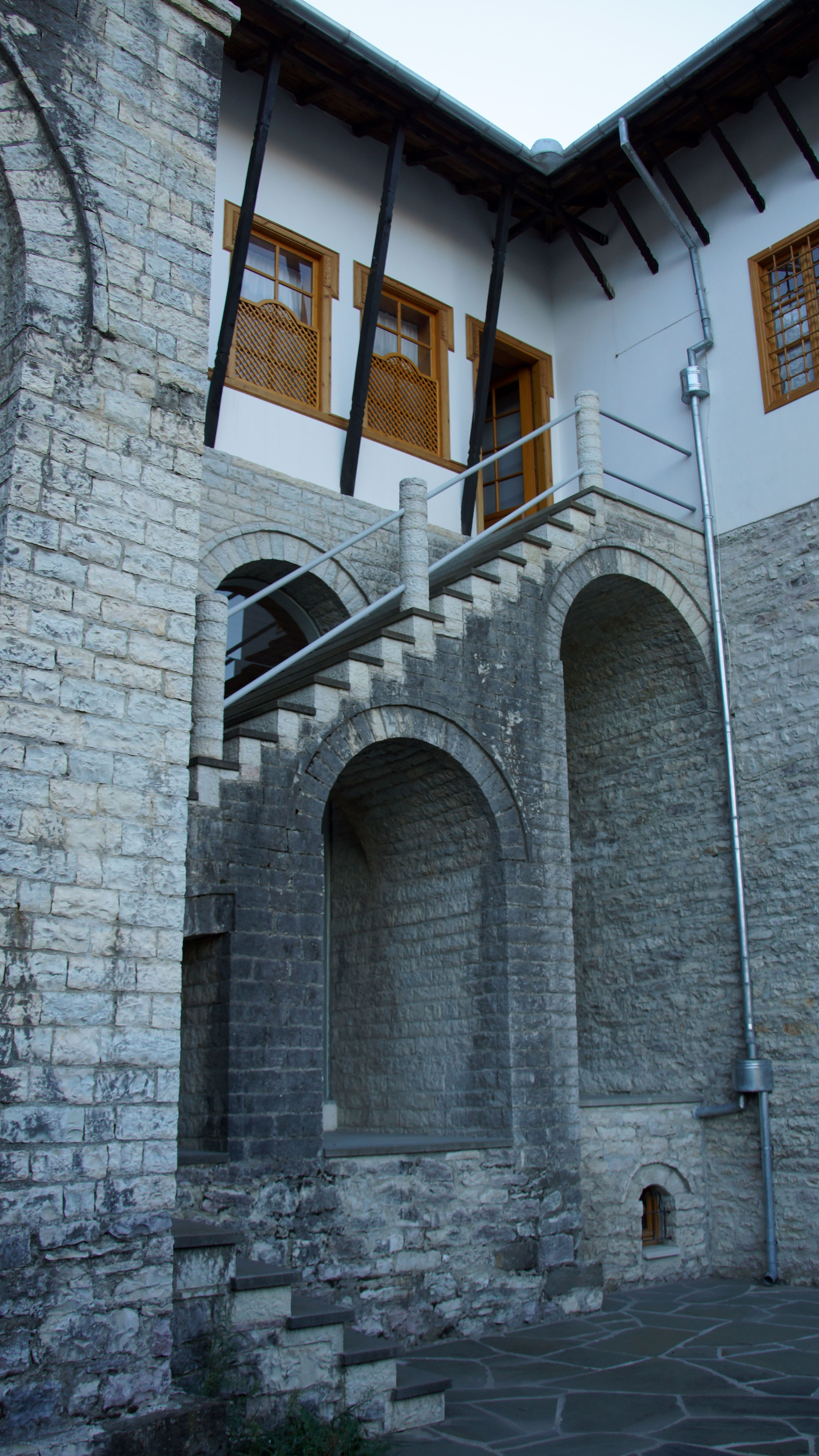
Konak (house) of Kadare in the Ottoman old town of Gjirokastër

At age 11, Kadare read William Shakespeare's play Macbeth. He recalled years later: "Because I did not yet understand that I could simply purchase it in a bookstore, I copied much of it by hand and took it home. My childhood imagination pushed me to feel like a co-author of the play."

He soon became entranced by literature. At age 12, Kadare wrote his first short stories, which were published in the Pionieri (Pioneer) journal in Tirana, a communist magazine for children. In 1954 he published his first collection of poems, Frymëzime djaloshare (Boyish inspirations). In 1957 he published a poetry collection entitled Ëndërrimet (Dreams).

At 17, Kadare won a poetry contest in Tirana, which allowed him to travel to Moscow to study at the Maxim Gorky Literature Institute. He studied literature during the Khrushchev era, doing post-graduate work from 1958 to 1960. His training had as its goal for him to become a communist writer and "engineer of human souls", to help construct a culture of the new Albania. In Moscow he met writers united under the banner of Socialist Realism—a style of art characterized by the idealized depiction of revolutionary communist values, such as the emancipation of the proletariat. Kadare also had the opportunity to read contemporary Western literature, including works by Jean Paul Sartre, Albert Camus, and Ernest Hemingway. He rejected the canons of Socialist Realism and committed himself internally to writing as opposed to dogmatism. He also cultivated contempt for the nomenklatura, an attitude which, he later wrote, was the product of his youthful arrogance rather than of considered political opposition. During his time in the Soviet Union, Kadare published a collection of poetry in Russian, and in 1959 also wrote his first novel, Qyteti pa reklama (The City Without Signs), a critique of socialist careerism in Albania.

Kadare returned home in October 1960 on Albanian orders, before Albania's breaking of political and economic ties with the USSR. He lived for the next 30 years in Tirana, in an apartment which now houses the Ismail Kadare House museum and archives. He worked as a journalist, became editor-in-chief of the literary periodical Les Lettres Albanaises (Albanian Letters; published simultaneously in Albanian and French), and then contributed to the literary review Drita for five years, while embarking on a literary career of his own.

At that time Kadare had a reputation for poetry. In 1961 he published a volume of poetry entitled Shekulli im (My Century). His work was particularly popular with Albanian youth. His future wife Helena, then a schoolgirl, wrote a fan letter to the young writer, which eventually led to their marriage in 1963.

Kadare wrote one of his earliest pieces in the 1960s, a poem entitled "The Princess Argjiro". Locally inspired, the poem transforms the centuries-old myth of the legendary 15th century Princess Argjiro, who was said to have jumped off Gjirokastër Castle along with her child to avoid being captured by the Ottomans. The poem was denounced and an official reader's report was commissioned, which maintained he had committed historical and ideological errors. Kadare was criticized implicitly for disregarding socialist literary principles.

In 1962, Kadare published an excerpt from his first novel as a short story under the title Coffeehouse Days in a communist youth magazine. It was banned immediately after publication, contributing to his reputation for "decadence".

In 1963, at 26 years of age, Kadare published his novel The General of the Dead Army, about an army general and a priest who, 20 years after World War II, are sent to Albania to locate the remains of fallen Italian soldiers and return them to Italy for burial. The novel faced criticism by Albanian literary critics for flouting socialist ideals and for its dark tone. The novel was thus in stark contrast to those of other Albanian writers of the time, who glorified the Communist revolution. The novel inspired three films: Luciano Tovoli's 1983 The General of the Dead Army (Il generale dell'armata morta) in Italian starring Marcello Mastroianni and Michel Piccoli, Bertrand Tavernier's 1989 Life and Nothing But (La Vie et rien d'autre) in French starring Philippe Noiret, and Dhimitër Anagnosti's 1989 The Return of the Dead Army (Kthimi i ushtrisë së vdekur) in Albanian starring Bujar Lako. Though it is his best-known novel, and Kadare viewed it as "good literature", he did not view it as his best work.

In 1964 he wrote Përse mendohen këto male (What are these mountains thinking about?). His next short novel, The Monster (Përbindëshi), published in the literary magazine Nëntori in 1965, was labelled "decadent" and banned upon publication; it was Kadare's second ban.

By the mid-1960s, the cultural censorship thaw of the early part of the decade was over, and conditions changed dramatically. In 1967, Albania launched its own Cultural Revolution. Kadare was exiled for two years along with other Albanian writers to Berat in the countryside, to learn about life alongside the peasants and workers. Two Albanian dramatists were at the time also sentenced to eight years in prison each. Albanian writers and artists encountered indifference from the world outside Albania, which did not speak in their support.

=== International breakthrough (1970–1980) ===
The General of the Dead Army was Kadare's first great success outside Albania. The French translation by Isuf Vrioni, published in 1970 in Paris by publisher Albin Michel, led to Kadare's international breakthrough. In the ironic novel, an Italian general and an Italian Army priest return to Albania 20 years after World War II, to find and bring back to Italy for final burial there the bodies of Italian soldiers killed in the war. The French publishing house published the novel without Kadare's knowledge or permission, as Albania at the time was not a signatory to the Universal Copyright Convention and there was no copyright protection on the text. Once the book appeared in France, it was translated into most European languages. By 1977 it had been translated into over 20 languages, with the Albanian communist press hailing it as "one of the most successful translations of the world of the 70s".

After the success of the novel in the West in 1970, the older generation of Albanian writers and dogmatic literary critics became extremely embittered against the "darling of the West": "This novel was published by the bourgeoisie and this cannot be accepted", said a report by the Albanian secret police. Kadare's enemies in the secret police and the old guard of the Albanian Politburo referred to him as an agent of the West, which was one of the most dangerous accusations that could be made in Albania. He continued to publish in his home country and became widely promoted there, with frequent references in the Albanian press to new releases and translations of his work, being hailed as a "hero of the new Albanian literature". Kadare's work was described as "treat[ing] many problems preoccupying" Albanian society, and as "mak[ing] use of the revolution as the organizing element of his writing". He was also lauded as having a "revolutionary drive" which "keeps pace with life and fights against old ideas".

In 1971 Kadare published the novel Chronicle in Stone, in which the narrator is a young Albanian boy whose old stone city hometown is caught up in World War II, and successively occupied by Greek, Italian, and German forces. The novel has been described as magic realism. John Updike wrote in The New Yorker, that it was "a thoroughly enchanting novel — sophisticated and accomplished in its poetic prose and narrative deftness, yet drawing resonance from its roots in one of Europe's most primitive societies". The book was heavily publicized in the Albanian press, both domestically and in magazines aimed at promoting Albanian socialism and culture to an international audience, such as New Albania.

Throughout the 1970s, Kadare began to work more with myths, legends, and the distant past, often drawing allusions between the Ottoman Empire and present-day Albania. At this time, he also worked as an editor and contributor to New Albania, an arts and culture magazine which sought to promote Albanian socialism to a worldwide audience.

In 1970, Kadare published Kështjella (The Castle or The Siege) which was celebrated in both Albania and Western Europe, seeing a translation into French in 1972. It detailed the war between Albanians and Ottomans during the time of Skanderbeg.

In 1978 he published the novel The Three-Arched Bridge, a political parable set in 1377 in the Balkans, narrated by an Albanian monk. The New York Times called it "an utterly captivating yarn: strange, vivid, ominous, macabre and wise".

After Kadare offended the authorities with a political poem entitled "The Red Pasha" in 1975 that poked fun at the Albanian Communist bureaucracy, he was denounced, narrowly avoiding being shot, and was ultimately sent to do manual labour in a remote village deep in the central Albanian countryside for a short time. After his return to Tirana, Kadare increasingly began to publish short novellas.

In 1980 Kadare published the novel Broken April, about the centuries-old tradition of hospitality, blood feuds, and revenge killing in the highlands of north Albania in the 1930s. The New York Times, reviewing it, wrote: "Broken April is written with masterly simplicity in a bardic style, as if the author is saying: Sit quietly and let me recite a terrible story about a blood feud and the inevitability of death by gunfire in my country. You know it must happen because that is the way life is lived in these mountains. Insults must be avenged; family honor must be upheld." The novel was adapted into the 2001 Brazilian film Behind the Sun (Abril Despedaçado) by filmmaker Walter Salles, set in 1910 Brazil and starring Rodrigo Santoro, which was nominated for a BAFTA Award for Best Film Not in the English Language and a Golden Globe Award for Best Foreign Language Film. The flashback portions of the 2006 Telugu feature film Pournami were also inspired by Behind the Sun, which in turn, was based on the novel.

=== Controversy and tension in Albania (1981–1990) ===
In 1981, Kadare published The Palace of Dreams, an anti-totalitarian fantasy novel. In the novel, an authoritarian dystopia (the imaginary U.O.S.; the United Ottoman States) through an enormous bureaucratic entity (the Palace of Dreams) collects every dream in the empire, sorts it, files it, analyses it, and reports the most dangerous ones to the Sultan. Kadare first published an excerpt of the novel as a short story, alongside some of his other new works, in his 1980 collection of four novellas, Gjakftohtësia (Cold-bloodedness). The following year, under the same title, Kadare published the completed novel in the second edition of Emblema e dikurshme (Signs of the Past); despite its political themes, it was not censored by the Albanian authorities.

After publishing The Palace of Dreams, readers began to draw comparisons between its critique of totalitarianism and the current government of Albania. At a meeting of the Albanian Writers Union, Kadare was accused by the president of the Union of deliberately evading politics by cloaking much of his fiction in history and folklore, and The Palace of Dreams was expressly condemned in the presence of several members of the Albanian Politburo. Kadare was accused of attacking the government in a covert manner, and the novel was viewed by the authorities as an anticommunist work and a mockery of the political system. As a result, the work was banned—but not before 20,000 copies had been sold. The authorities were initially reluctant to imprison or purge Kadare, as he had become an internationally recognized literary figure and it would have caused an international backlash – which, given the country's rapid economic decline, the government wanted to avoid at all costs. Western press reacted to the condemnation of The Palace of Dreams, and Western protests mounted in his defence. Of all his books, he was most proud of having written this one.

That same year Kadare finished his novel The Concert, a satirical account of the Sino-Albanian split, but it was criticized by the authorities and was not published until 1988.

Communist Albanian leader Enver Hoxha presided over a Stalinist regime of forced collectivization and suppression from the end of World War II until 1985. He initiated a process of eliminating Kadare, but backed off due to Western reaction. There was a nightly presence of authorities outside of Kadare's apartment. Albanian historian and scholar Anton Logoreci described Kadare during this time as "a rare sturdy flower growing, inexplicably, in a largely barren patch".

In January 1985, Kadare's novel A Moonlit Night was published, only to be banned by the authorities. On 9 April 1985, Hoxha fell into a coma; the next night he died, aged 76. In the evening on the day when the ailing dictator died, members of the Union of Writers, the Albanian Politburo, and the Central Committee of the Communist Party hastily organized a meeting in order to condemn Moonlit Night.

That same year Kadare wrote the novella Agamemnon's Daughter – a direct critique, set in the 1970s, of the oppressive regime in Albania. It was smuggled out of the country, with the help of Kadare's French editor Claude Durand, but was not published until 2003.

In 1990 Kadare requested a meeting with Albanian president Ramiz Alia, at which he urged him to end human rights abuses, implement democratic and economic reforms, and end the isolation of Albania. Kadare was disappointed with Alia's slow reaction.

=== Political asylum in France (1990–2024) ===
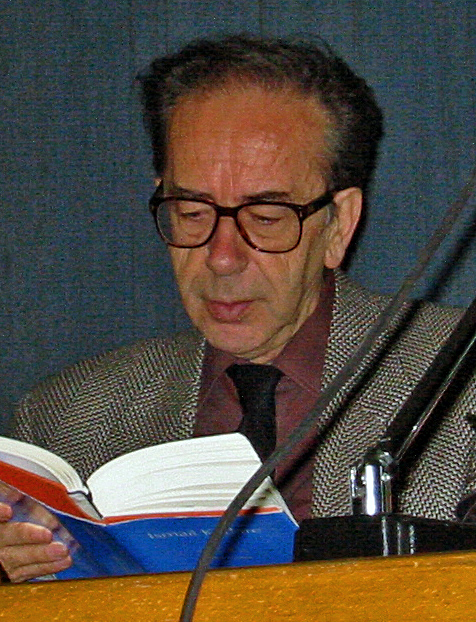
Kadare in 2002

In October 1990, after he criticized the Albanian government, urged democratization of isolationist Albania – Europe's last Communist-ruled country, then with a population of 3.3 million – and facing the ire of its authorities and threats from the Sigurimi secret police, Kadare sought and received political asylum in France. He defected to Paris, where he thereafter primarily lived, except for a time in Tirana. He decided to defect because he had become disillusioned with the government of Ramiz Alia, legal opposition was not allowed in Albania, and he was convinced "that more than any action [he] could take in Albania, [his] defection would help the democratization of [his] country". The New York Times wrote that he was a national figure in Albania comparable in popularity perhaps to Mark Twain in the United States, and that "there is hardly an Albanian household without a Kadare book, and even foreign visitors are presented with volumes of his verse as souvenirs".

The official Albanian press agency reacted by issuing a statement on, what they called, "this ugly act", saying Kadare had placed himself "in the services of the enemies of Albania". Some intellectuals, at great personal risk, publicly supported Kadare, whom the authorities had declared a traitor. Poet Dritero Agolli, who headed the Albanian Writers' Union, said: "I continue to have great respect for his work." Despite this, his books were not fully banned by the Communist authorities, and he remained a popular and celebrated author.

After receiving political asylum and settling in France, Kadare continued to write. His exile in Paris was fruitful and enabled him to succeed further, writing both in Albanian and in French.

His 1992 novel The Pyramid is a political allegory set in Egypt in the 26th century BC, focusing on intrigues behind the construction of the Great Pyramid of Cheops. In it, Kadare mocked any dictator's love for hierarchy and useless monuments. In some of Kadare's novels, comprising the so-called "Ottoman Cycle", the Ottoman Empire is used as the archetype of a totalitarian state. In 1993, the novel was awarded the Prix Méditerranée Étranger in France.

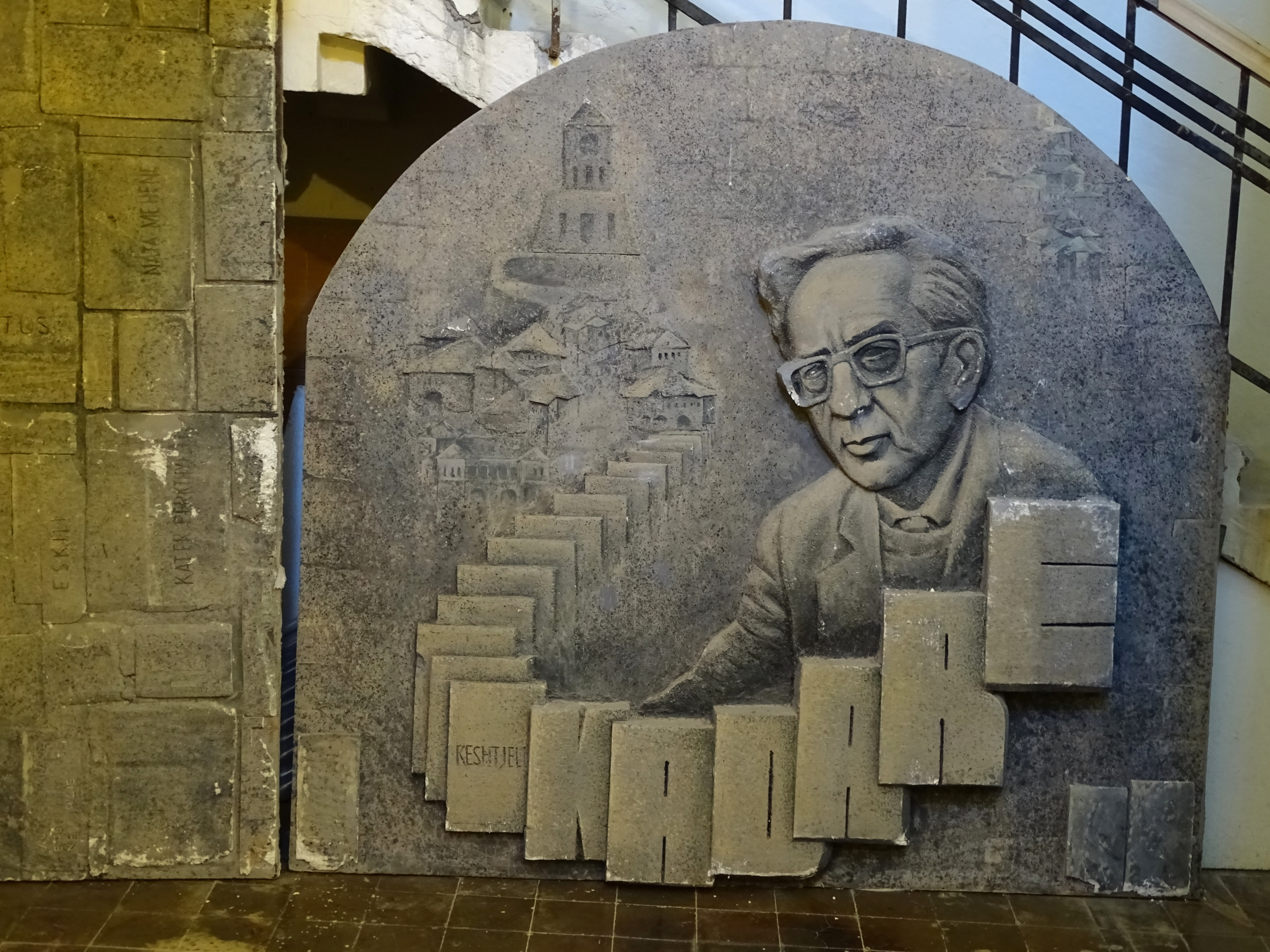
Frieze honoring Kadare at Gjirokastër Castle

In 1994 he began to work on the first bilingual volume of his work with the French publishing house Fayard. The same year, at the request of the French publisher Flammarion, he wrote the essay "La légende des légendes" ("The legend of legends"), which was immediately translated to French and published in 1995.

Kadare's 1996 novel Spiritus marked a narrative and compositional turning point in his literary career. In it, two ghosts return to a post-Communist world. Its influence is felt in all of his subsequent novels. It deals with a group of foreigners who are touring Eastern Europe after the fall of Communism and hear exciting rumours during their stay in Albania about the capture of the spirit from the dead. As it turns out, the spirit is in fact a listening device known to the notorious secret service as a "hornet".

Kadare's 2008 novel The Fall of the Stone City was awarded the Rexhai Surroi Prize in Kosovo, and was shortlisted for the Independent Foreign Fiction Prize in 2013. His semi-autobiographical novel The Doll was published in 2020. It focuses on his complex bonds with his mother and his country.

Beginning in the 1990s, Kadare was asked multiple times by both the country's major political parties to run for president of Albania, but he always declined.

== Later life and death ==
Kadare married Albanian author Helena Gushi and had two daughters. Besiana Kadare is the Albanian ambassador to the United Nations, its ambassador to Cuba and a vice president of the United Nations General Assembly for its 75th session.

Kadare returned to Albania in his later years. After suffering from ill health for several years, he died from a heart attack at a Tirana hospital, on 1 July 2024, at the age of 88. He was granted a state funeral on 3 July at the National Theatre of Opera and Ballet in Tirana, but was buried in a private ceremony shortly afterwards. Two days of mourning were declared in Albania, while one day of mourning was declared in neighboring Kosovo.

== Awards ==
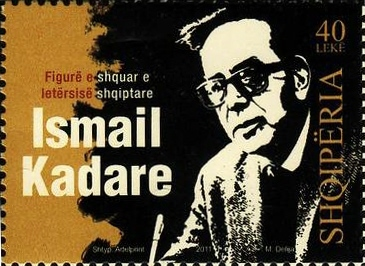
Kadare on a 2011 Albanian postal stamp celebrating his 75th birthday

In 1992, Kadare was awarded the Prix mondial Cino Del Duca international literary award in France. In 1996 he was made a lifetime member of the Academy of Moral and Political Sciences of France (Académie des Sciences Morales et Politiques), one of the five academies that make up the Institut de France learned society, in the chair vacated by the recently deceased philosopher Karl Popper. In 1998 he was awarded the international Herder Prize in Austria. In 2003 he received the Ovid Prize international award in Romania, and the Presidential Gold Medal of the League of Prizren from the President of Kosovo.

In 2005 Kadare received the inaugural Man Booker International Prize in the United Kingdom for the full body of his work. In his acceptance speech, he said: "We propped each other up as we tried to write literature as if that regime did not exist. Now and again we pulled it off. At other times we didn't."

In 2008 Kadare received the Flaiano Prize international award in Italy. In 2009, Kadare was awarded the Prince of Asturias Award for Literature in Spain, for his literary works.

In 2015, Kadare was awarded the bi-annual Jerusalem Prize in Israel. Speaking of the relationship between Albania and the Jews, he said: "I come from one of the few countries in the world which helped the Jews during World War II. I believe the number of Jews there grew from 200 at the start of the war to 2,000 by the end. The population always defended the Jews, whether during the kingdom, under Communism, or after it." He noted that during the Holocaust Albanians refused to hand Jews over to the Nazis, and many Albanians went to great lengths to protect Jewish refugees who had fled to Albania. He also noted that Albania and Israel share in common the experience of fighting for survival in a sometimes hostile neighbourhood.

In 2016, Kadare became the first Albanian Commandeur de la Légion d'Honneur recipient, with the award being given to him by French president François Hollande. That year he was also awarded the Albanian National Flag Decoration, Albania's highest decoration, by President Bujar Nishani. He won the 2018 International Nonino Prize in Italy.

Kadare won the 2019 Park Kyong-ni Prize, an international award based in South Korea, for his literary works during his career.

In 2023, Kadare won the America Award in Literature for a lifetime contribution to international writing. That year he was also named Grand Officer (Grand officier) of the Legion of Honour by a special decree of French president Emmanuel Macron, and thus was ranked among the 250 world-renowned personalities honoured by France. The Legion of Honour is the highest state title awarded by France.

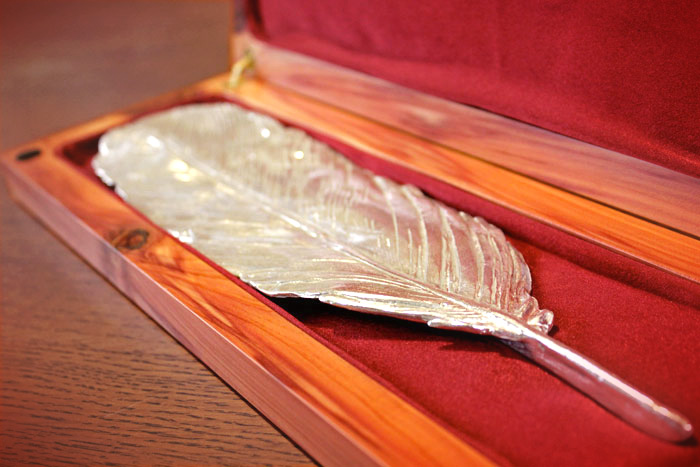
The Neustadt Prize Feather

Kadare was nominated for the 2020 Neustadt International Prize for Literature (described as the "American Nobel") in the United States by Bulgarian writer Kapka Kassabova. He was selected as the 2020 laureate by the Prize's jury. He won the 2020 Neustadt International Prize for Literature. In his acceptance speech, he observed: "There is no room for literature in the Marxist vision of the future world." His nominating juror wrote: "Kadare is the successor of Franz Kafka. No one since Kafka has delved into the infernal mechanism of totalitarian power and its impact on the human soul in as much hypnotic depth as Kadare."

Kadare won the 2020 Prozart Award, given by the PRO-ZA Balkan International Literature Festival, for his contributions to the development of literature in the Balkans.

Kadare received the President of the Republic of Albania "Honor of the Nation" Decoration, and the French state order "Cross of the Legion of Honor". He was also a member of the Academy of Albania, the Berlin Academy of Arts, and the Mallarmé Academy, and was awarded honorary doctorates in 1992 from the University of Grenoble III in France, in 2003 from the University of Pristina in Kosovo, and in 2009 from the University of Palermo in Italy.

Kadare was nominated for the Nobel Prize in Literature 15 times. He stated that the press spoke about him being a potential Nobel Prize winner so much, that "many people think that I've already won it".

In 2023 Kadare was granted citizenship of Kosovo.

== Legacy ==
Kadare was considered to be one of the greatest writers in the world. The London newspaper The Independent said of Kadare: "He has been compared to Gogol, Kafka and Orwell. But Kadare's is an original voice, universal but deeply rooted in his own soil." The New York Times said his fiction has been compared with that of Gabriel García Márquez, as well as Milan Kundera, and The Christian Science Monitor wrote he has also been compared with Dostoevsky and Isak Dinesen. Translator and biographer David Bellos wrote: "In some ways, he's like Balzac." Critic Richard Eder called him "a supreme fictional interpreter of the psychology and physiognomy of oppression".

Kadare's literary works were conceived in the bedrock of tiny Albanian literature, almost unknown before in Europe or the rest of the world. With Kadare it became known, read, and appreciated. For the first time in its history, through Kadare, Albanian literature has been integrated into wider European and world literature.

Kadare's oeuvre is a literature of resistance. He managed to write normal literature in an abnormal country – a Communist dictatorship. He had to struggle to get his literary works published, going against state policy. At times even putting his life at risk. Dissent was not allowed in Albania. Kadare noted: "That was not possible. You risked being shot. Not condemned, but shot for a word against the regime. A single word."

Under Hoxha, at least 100,000 people were imprisoned for political reasons or for a word they said or wrote; 5,000, including many writers, were executed.

Kadare devised numerous subtle stratagems to outwit Communist censors. He used old devices such as parable, myth, fable, folk-tale, allegory, and legend, and sprinkled them with double-entendre, allusion, insinuation, satire, and coded messages.

His oeuvre in general has been in theoretical and practical opposition to the mandatory Socialist Realism required by the State. Kadare challenged Socialist Realism for three decades and opposed it with his subjective realism, avoiding state censorship by using allegorical, symbolic, historical and mythological means.

The conditions in which Kadare lived and published his works were not comparable to other European Communist countries where at least some level of public dissent was tolerated. Rather, the situation in Albania was comparable to North Korea or to the Soviet Union in the 1930s under Stalin. Despite this, Kadare used any opportunity to attack the regime in his works, by means of political allegories, which were picked up by educated Albanian readers. Henri Amouroux, a member of the Académie des Sciences Morales et Politiques of France, pointed out that Soviet dissidents including Solzhenitsyn published their works during the era of de-Stalinization, whereas Kadare lived and published his works in a country which remained Stalinist until 1990.

== Works ==
Kadare's works have been published in 45 languages. By 2020 most of his approximately 80 novels, plays, screenplays, poetry, essays, and story collections had been translated into different languages.

Among Kadare's best-known books are The General of the Dead Army (1963), The Siege (1970), The Ghost Rider (1980), Broken April (1980; blood feuds in the highlands of north Albania), The Palace of Dreams (1981), The Pyramid (1992), and The Successor (2003; regarding the mysterious death of Hoxha's handpicked successor, Mehmet Shehu).

Some Kadare books were translated into English by David Bellos, from French translations rather than the Albanian originals.

== Honors and awards ==
- Grand Officer of the Order of Legion of Honour (2020)
- Commander of the Ordre des Arts et des Lettres (1996)

=== English translations ===
The following Kadare novels have been translated into English:

- The General of the Dead Army (Albanian: Gjenerali i ushtrisë së vdekur), ISBN 9780099518266
- The Siege (Albanian: Kështjella), ISBN 978-1-84767-185-1
- Chronicle in Stone (Albanian: Kronikë në gur), ISBN 978-0-941533-00-3
- Broken April (Albanian: Prilli i thyer), ISBN 978-0-941533-57-7
- The Three-Arched Bridge (Albanian: Ura me tri harqe), ISBN 978-1-55970-368-0
- The Palace of Dreams (Albanian: Pallati i ëndrrave), ISBN 978-0-688-11183-0
- The Concert (Albanian: Koncert në fund të dimrit), ISBN 978-0-688-09762-2
- The File on H (Albanian: Dosja H: roman), ISBN 978-1-55970-401-4
- The Pyramid (Albanian: Piramida), ISBN 978-1-55970-314-7
- Elegy for Kosovo (Albanian: Tri këngë zie për Kosovën), ISBN 978-1-55970-528-8
- Spring Flowers, Spring Frost (Albanian: Lulet e ftohta të marsit), ISBN 978-1-55970-635-3
- The Successor (Albanian: Pasardhësi), ISBN 978-1-55970-773-2
- Agamemnon's Daughter (Albanian: Vajza e Agamemnonit), ISBN 978-1-55970-788-6
- The Blinding Order (Albanian: Qorrfermani), ISBN 978-1611451085
- The Fall of the Stone City (Albanian: Darka e Gabuar), ISBN 978-0-8021-2068-7
- The Accident (Albanian: Aksidenti), ISBN 978-0-8021-2995-6
- The Ghost Rider (Albanian: Kush e solli Doruntinën?), ISBN 978-1-84767-341-1
- Twilight of the Eastern Gods (Albanian: Muzgu i perëndive të stepës), ISBN 978-0-8021-2311-4
- A Girl in Exile (Albanian: E penguara), ISBN 978-1-61902-916-3
- The Traitor's Niche (Albanian: Kamarja e turpit), ISBN 978-1-64009-044-6
- Essays on World Literature: Aeschylus • Dante • Shakespeare (Albanian: Tri sprova mbi letërsinë botërore), ISBN 9781632061751
- Stormy Weather on Mount Olympus (Albanian: Stinë e mërzitshme në Olimp)
- The Doll: A Portrait of My Mother (Albanian: Kukulla), ISBN 978-1-64009-422-2
- A Dictator Calls (Albanian: Kur sunduesit grinden), ISBN 978-1-64009-608-0

=== Albanian ===
Kadare's complete works (other than essays, poetry, and short stories) were published by Fayard, simultaneously in French and Albanian, between 1993 and 2004. His original Albanian-language works have been published exclusively by Onufri Publishing House since 1996, as single works or entire sets. Published in 2009, the set of complete works constituted 20 volumes.

The dates of publication given here are those of the first publication in Albanian, unless stated otherwise.

==== Novels and novellas ====
- Gjenerali i ushtrisë së vdekur (The General of the Dead Army) (1963)
- Përbindëshi (The Monster) (1965)
- Dasma (The Wedding) (1968)
- Kështjella (The Siege) (1970)
- Kronikë në gur (Chronicle in Stone) (1971)
- Dimri i vetmisë së madhe (The Winter of Great Solitude) (1973) ISBN 978-99956-87-85-4
- Nëntori i një kryeqyteti (November of a Capital) (1975)
- Muzgu i perëndive të stepës (Twilight of the Eastern Gods) (1976)
- Komisioni i festës (The Feast Commission) (1978) ISBN 9789989572296
- Ura me tri harqe (The Three-Arched Bridge) (1978)
- Kamarja e turpit (The Traitor's Niche) (1978) ISBN 9781784873202
- Prilli i thyer (Broken April) (1980)
- Kush e solli Doruntinën? (The Ghost Rider) (1980)
- Pallati i ëndrrave (The Palace of Dreams) (1981)
- Nata me hënë (A Moonlit Night) (1985)
- Viti i mbrapshtë (The Dark Year) (1984)
- Krushqit janë të ngrirë (The Wedding Procession Turned to Ice) (1983)
- Koncert në fund të dimrit (The Concert) (1988)
- Dosja H. (The File on H.) (1989)
- Qorrfermani (The Blinding Order) (1991) ISBN 978-1611451085
- Piramida (The Pyramid) (1992)
- Hija (The Shadow) (1994)
- Shkaba (The Eagle) (1995)
- Spiritus (1996)
- Qyteti pa reklama (The City with no Signs) (1998, written in 1959)
- Lulet e ftohta të marsit (Spring Flowers, Spring Frost) (2000)
- Breznitë e Hankonatëve (2000) ISBN 978-9928-164-16-2
- Vajza e Agamemnonit (Agamemnon's Daughter) (2003)
- Pasardhësi (The Successor) (2003)
- Jeta, loja dhe vdekja Lul Mazrekut (Life, Game and Death of Lul Mazrek) (2003)
- Çështje të marrëzisë (A Question of Lunacy) (2005)
- Darka e Gabuar (The Fall of the Stone City) (2008)
- E penguara: Rekuiem për Linda B. (A Girl in Exile) (2009)
- Aksident (The Accident) (2004)
- Mjegullat e Tiranës (Tirana's Mists) (2014, originally written in 1957–58) ISBN 978-9928-186-04-1
- Kukulla (The Doll) (2015)

==== Plays ====
- Stinë e mërzitshme në Olimp (Stormy Weather on Mount Olympus) (1998)

==== Screenplays ====
- Sorkadhet e trembura (Frightened Gazelles) (2009)

==== Poetry ====
- Frymëzime djaloshare (1954)
- Ëndërrimet (1957)
- Princesha Argjiro (1957)
- Përse mendohen këto male (1964)
- Motive me diell (1968)
- Koha (1976)
- Ca pika shiu ranë mbi qelq (2004) OCLC 53981405
- Pa formë është qielli (2005) ISBN 9789992745151
- Vepra poetike në një vëllim (2018) ISBN 978-9928-226-94-5

==== Essays ====
- Autobiografia e popullit në vargje (The People's Autobiography in Verse) (1971)
- Eskili, ky humbës i madh (Aeschylus, The Lost) (1985)
- Ftesë në studio (Invitation to the Writer's Studio) (1990)
- Nga një dhjetor në tjetrin (Albanian Spring) (1991)
- Legjenda e legjendave (1996)
- Kushëriri i engjëjve (The Angels' Cousin) (1997) ISBN 978-9928-164-13-1
- Kombi shqiptar në prag të mijëvjeçarit të tretë (The Albanian Nation on the Threshold of the Third Millennium) (1998) OCLC 42591890
- Unaza në kthetra (The Ring on the Claw) (2001) ISBN 9789992745304
- Poshtërimi në Ballkan (Abasement in the Balkans) (2004)
- Identiteti evropian i shqiptarëve (The European Identity of Albanians) (2006)
- Dantja i pashmangshëm (Dante, The Inevitable) (2006)
- Hamlet, le prince impossible (Hamlet, The Impossible Prince) (2007)
- Don Kishoti në Ballkan (Don Quixote in the Balkans) (2009)
- Mosmarrëveshja, mbi raportet e Shqipërisë me vetveten (2010) ISBN 978-9928-164-24-7
- Mbi krimin në Ballkan; Letërkëmbim i zymtë (On Crime in the Balkans)(2011)
- Çlirimi i Serbisë prej Kosovës (Serbia's Liberation from Kosovo) (2012) ISBN 978-99956-87-92-2
- Mëngjeset në Kafe Rostand (Mornings in Cafe Rostand) (2014) ISBN 9789928186256
- Arti si mëkat (Art as a Sin) (2015) ISBN 978-9928-186-63-8
- Uragani i ndërprerë: Ardhja e Migjenit në letërsinë shqipe (The Interrupted Hurricane: The Advent of Migjeni in Albanian Literature) (2015) ISBN 978-9928-186-58-4
- Tri sprova mbi letërsinë botërore (Essays on World Literature) (2017) ISBN 978-9928-226-88-4
- Kur sunduesit grinden (When Rulers Quarrel) (2018) ISBN 978-9928-261-44-1

==== Story collections ====
- Emblema e dikurshme (1977)
- Ëndërr mashtruese (1991)
- Tri këngë zie për Kosovën (1998)
- Vjedhja e gjumit mbretëror (1999) ISBN 9789928164148
- Përballë pasqyrës së një gruaje (2001)
- Bisedë për brilantet në pasditen e dhjetorit (2013) ISBN 9789928164407
- Koha e dashurisë (Rrëfim Trikohësh) (2015) ISBN 978-9928-186-87-4
- Proza e shkurtër, në një vëllim (2018) ISBN 978-9928-261-05-2

== See also ==
- Kadare Prize
- Albanian literature
- List of literary works by number of translations
- List of refugees

== Sources ==
- Apolloni, Ag (2012). Paradigma e proteut ("Gjenerali i ushtrisë së vdekur"): monografi. Prishtinë: OM. ISBN 978-9951-632-04-1.
- Bejko, Sadik (2007). Disidentët e rremë (in Albanian). Tiranë: 55.
- Brisku, Adrian (2013). Bittersweet Europe: Albanian and Georgian Discourses on Europe, 1878–2008. New York: Berghahn Books. ISBN 978-0-85745-985-5.
- Dervishi, Met (2014). Intertekstualja dhe disidentja te Dimri i Vetmisë së Madhe. Tirana: Saras.
- Kadare, Helena (2011). Kohë e pamjaftueshme. Tirana: Onufri. ISBN 978-99956-87-51-9.
- Morgan, Peter (2011). Kadare: Shkrimtari dhe diktatura 1957-1990 (1 ed.). Tiranë: Shtëpia Botuese "55". ISBN 978-9928-106-12-4.
- Rodrigo Breto, Jose Carlos (2018). Ismail Kadare: La grand estratagema. Barcelona: Ediciones del Subsuelo. ISBN 978-84-947802-0-2.v
- Sinani, Shaban (2011). Letërsia në totalitarizëm dhe "Dossier K". Naim Frashëri.
- Sulstarova, Enis (2006). Arratisje Nga Lindja: Orientalizmi Shqiptar Nga Naimi Te Kadareja. Globic Press. ISBN 978-0-9776662-4-9.
