= Jusuf Vrioni =

Albanian translator (1916-2001)

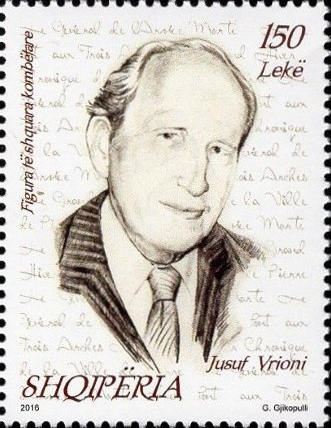
Vrioni on a 2016 stamp of Albania

Jusuf Vrioni (16 March 1916 – 1 June 2001) was an Albanian athlete, translator, diplomat, and Albanian ambassador to UNESCO.

== History ==
Vrioni was born in Corfu, Greece, on 16 March 1916, son of Ilias Bey Vrioni and Xhemile Dino. He spent his youth in Corfu and later in Berat. With the assignment of his father as Ambassador to France, he moved to Paris in 1925. Vrioni studied in the Janson de Sailly Lyceum, Paris, and later in the Grande école des hautes études commerciales de Paris, and Institut d'études politiques of Paris.

Vrioni returned to Albania in 1939, leaving again for Rome after the Italian invasion of Albania. He returned to Tirana in 1943. On 13 September 1947 he was arrested by the communists and finally in 1950 got a 15-year sentence with forced hard-labor. He was released in late 1958 and interned in Fier. In 1960, due to his knowledge of foreign languages he started working as translator in Tirana. He distinguished himself as a francophone and got respect through the intellectual and artistic circles of that time. He is noted for turning out French translations of a number of novels by Ismail Kadare, which were then rendered into English from Vrioni's translations.

After the fall of communism in Albania, Vrioni started working as Director of the Albanian Helsinki Committee for Human Rights. Following the turmoils of 1997 in Albania, he left for Paris. In 1998 he was assigned as Representative of Albania at UNESCO. On 22 May 1998, he received the title Chevalier de la Légion d'Honneur from the French authorities.

On 10 January 2000, Vrioni was interviewed by Blendi Fevziu on his talk-show "Opinion" on Klan Television, marking his first ever interview.

== Death and legacy ==
Vrioni died in Paris on 1 June 2001 at the age of 85.

On 18 June 2001, Vrioni was given the title "Honorary Citizen" of Berat.

As a sign of appreciation for Vrioni's work, Albanian Ministry of Culture, Tourism, and Sports created a special prize named after him. A street in Tirana, Albania is named after him.
