= Onufri Publishing House =

Albanian publishing house

- Founded: 1992
- Founder: Bujar Hudhri
- Country of origin: Albania
- Headquarters location: Rruga S. Gabrani; Tirana, Albania
- Publication types: Books
- Imprints: Minerva
- No. of employees: 21 (as of November, 2012)
- Official website: onufri.com

Onufri Publishing House (Albanian: Shtëpia Botuese Onufri), also known as Onufri Publishing (Albanian: Onufri Botime) is an independent Albanian publishing house with its centre in Tirana, Albania and a branch office in Pristina. It was founded in 1992 and is regarded as of the leading publishers of classics and scholarly works in Albanian. It also publishes works by foreign authors and scholars in Italian and English. The publishing house is named after the 16th century Albanian painter Onufri. The publishing house's founder and current CEO is Bujar Hudhri.

== History ==
In 1992 Bujar Hudhri founded Onufri soon after the fall of communism with a vision to continue the promulgation of Albanian culture at a time of Albania's history when its population had become infatuated with foreign works.

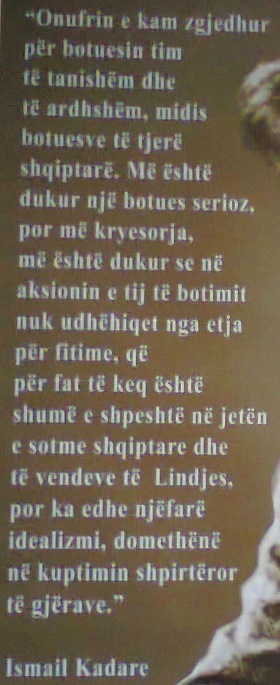
Ismail Kadare on Onufri Publishing House in Albanian

In 1996 Albanian author Ismail Kadare stated that he had chosen Onufri exclusively for all his works published in Albanian because of Onufri's seriousness, idealism, and lack of "greed for profit that has, unfortunately, become frequent in ... Eastern European countries."

In 2008 and 2010 Onufri was awarded the Lumo Skëndo Bibliophilia prize by the National Library of Albania and Albanian Ministry of Cultural Affairs.

In 2012 Onufri launched its Minerva imprint for the publication of general interest books.

== Titles ==
Significant titles published by Onufri include:

- The complete works of Ismail Kadare.
- The complete works of Martin Camaj.
- Selected works of William Shakespeare.
- The Siege of Shkodra by Marin Barleti.
- Kohë e pamjaftueshme by Helena Kadare.
- Greek classics translated by Henrik Lacaj.
- Albania Ritrovata by Lucia Nadin.
