= List of Albanian women writers =

This is a list of women writers who were born in Albania or whose writings are closely associated with that country.

== A ==
- Rreze Abdullahu (born 1989), Kosovo war diarist
- Mimoza Ahmeti (born 1963), poet, short story writer, essayist
- Valdete Antoni (born 1953), poet
- Lindita Arapi (born 1972), poet, novelist, journalist, works published in German

== B ==
- Lida Berisha (born 1991), satire writer
- Maria Antonia Braile, poet
- Flora Brovina (born 1949), Kosovar-Albanian poet, journalist, women's rights activist
- Klara Buda (born 1964), Albanian-American journalist, radio and television presenter

== C ==
- Selfixhe Ciu (1918–2003), novelist
- Diana Culi (born 1951), novelist, short story writer, screenwriter, politician

== D ==
- Elvira Dones (born 1960), screenwriter, journalist, documentary film producer, now living in the United States
- Ledia Dushi (born 1978), poet writing in Gheg Albanian

== E ==
- Fabiola Laco Egro (born 1963), nonfiction writer and human rights activist

== G ==
- Julia Gjika (born 1949), poet, now living in the United States

== I ==
- Anilda Ibrahimi (born 1972), novelist, now living in Italy

== K ==
- Helena Kadare (born 1943), short story writer, novelist, now living in Paris
- Jolanda Kodra (1910–1963), writer and translator
- Musine Kokalari (1917–1983), short story writer, first published woman writer in Albania
- Mirela Kumbaro (born 1966), translator and publisher
- Irma Kurti (born 1966), Albanian - Italian poet, novel and short story writer, journalist, lyricist and translator now living in Italy

== L ==
- Natasha Lako (born 1948), poet, novelist
- Luljeta Lleshanaku (born 1968), poet, magazine editor, some poetry translated into English
- Masiela Lusha (born 1985), Albanian-American poet, novelist, children's writer, translator, actress, humanitarian

== M ==
- Kristina Gentile Mandala (1856–1919), Albanian poet and folklorist in Sicily
- Ludmilla Pajo (1947–1995), writer and journalist

== S ==
- Iliriana Sulkuqi (born 1951), Albanian-American poet, journalist

== V ==
- Ornela Vorpsi (born 1968), novelist, photographer

== W ==
- Anila Wilms, novelist, now living in Germany

== Y ==
- Lea Ypi (born 1979), nonfiction writer, now living in England

== See also ==
- List of Albanian writers
- List of women writers
