= List of people from Tirana =

The following are notable people who were either born, raised, or have lived for a significant period of time in Tirana, Albania.

== List ==
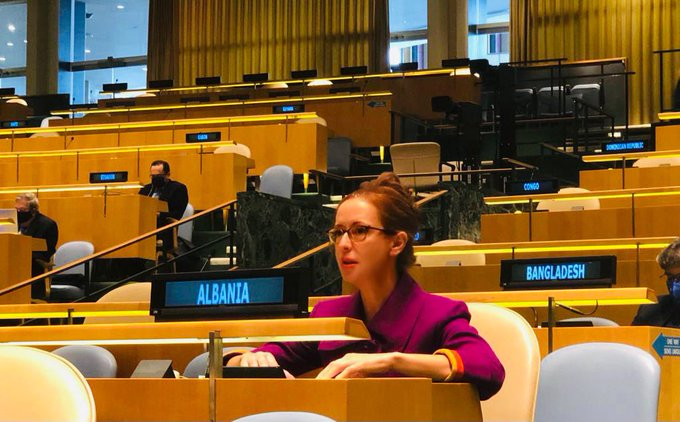
Ambassador Besiana Kadare in the UN General Assembly hall

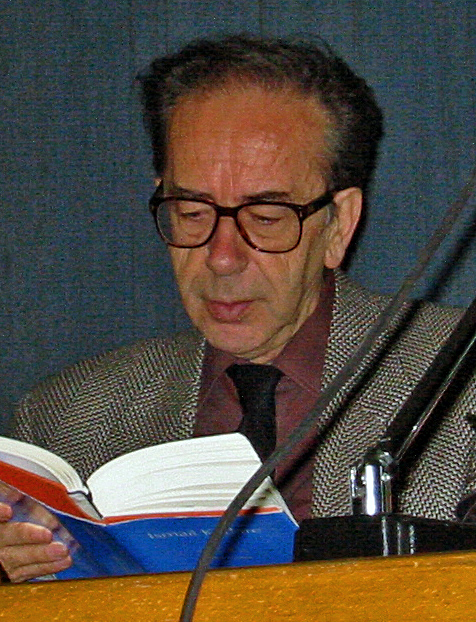
Ismail Kadare

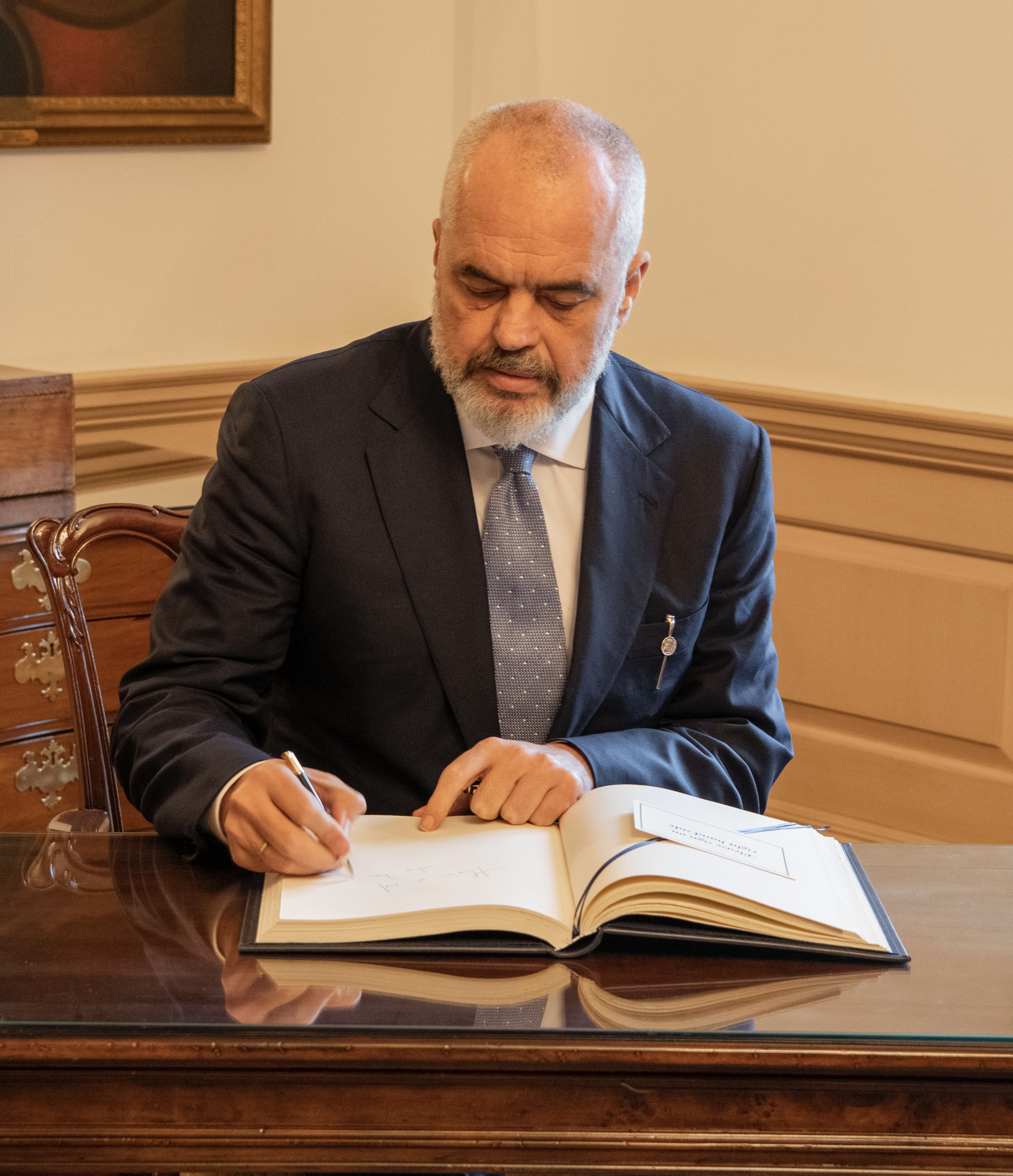
Edi Rama

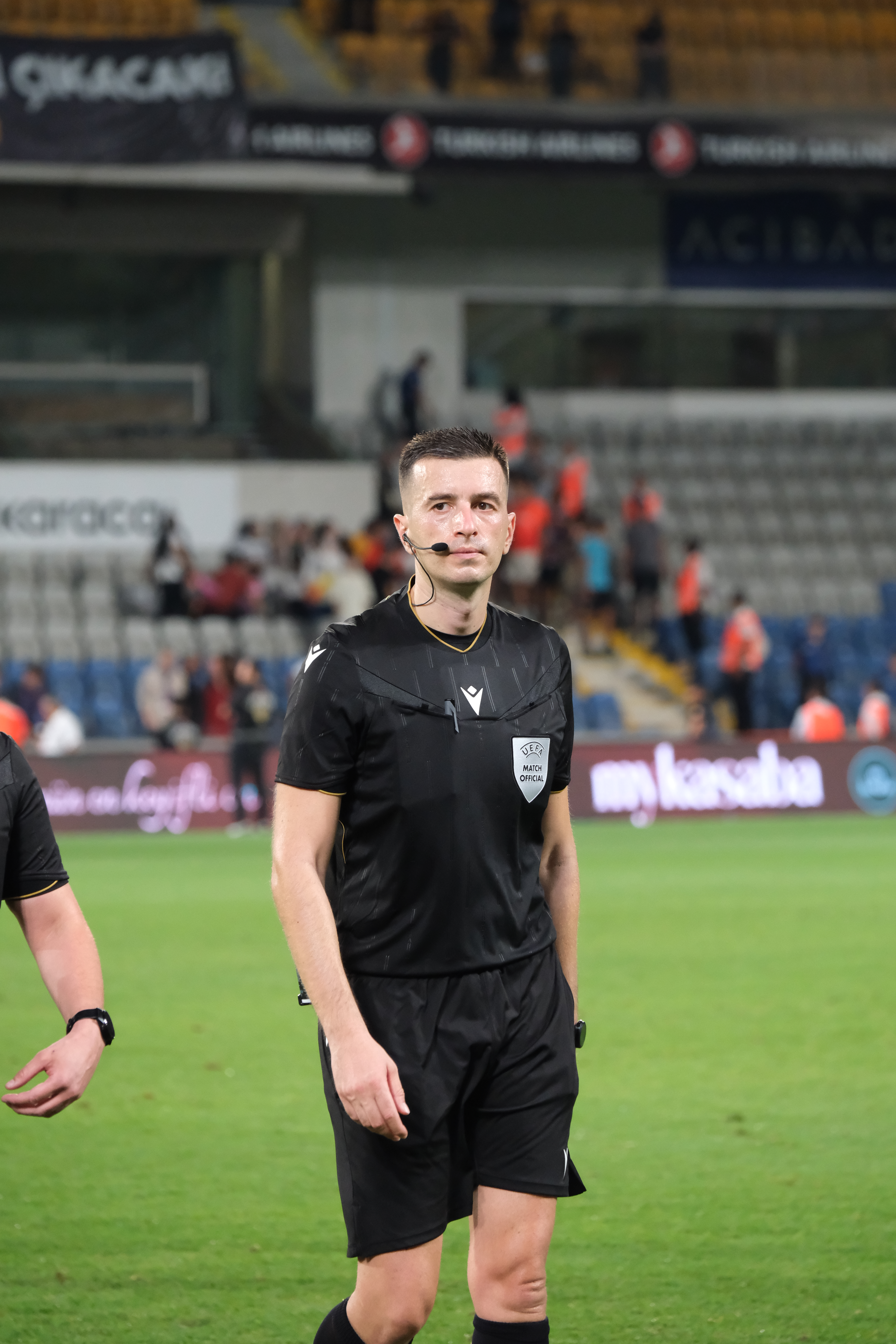
Juxhin Xhaja

- Beqir Balluku (1917–1975) – former member of the Politburo; accused as organizer of a coup d'etat in 1974, and sentenced to death
- Erjon Bogdani (born 1977) – football player
- Albert Brojka (born 1958) – former Tirana mayor
- Pirro Çako (born 1965) – singer and composer
- Fabiola Laco Egro (born 1963) – social activist
- Elona Gjebrea (born 1968) – Socialist Party of Albania politician
- Shpresa Gjongecaj (born 1952) – archaeologist and numismatist
- Besiana Kadare (born 1972) – Albanian Ambassador to the United Nations
- Ismail Kadare (1936–2024) – novelist and poet, winner of the 2005 Man Booker International Prize, the 2009 Prince of Asturias Award, and the 2015 Jerusalem Prize.
- Kledi Kadiu (born 1974) – dancer and actor; lives and works in Italy
- Ilir Shaqiri (born 1973) – ballet dancer and choreographer, lives and works in Italy
- Sali Kelmendi (1947–2015) – former Tirana mayor
- Vedat Kokona (1913–1998) – translator of the Albanian language
- Maksim Konomi (born 1946) – politician
- Saimir Kumbaro (born 1945) – film director
- Elsa Lila (born 1981) – singer
- Leka, Crown Prince of Albania (1939–2011) – heir of King Zog I
- Masiela Lusha (born 1985) – actress, poet, and writer
- Pandeli Majko (born 1967) – twice Prime Minister of Albania
- Rexhep Meidani (born 1944) – former President of Albania
- Aleksandër Meksi (born 1939) – former Prime Minister
- Inva Mula (born 1963) – opera singer
- Elvis Naçi (born 1977) – Imam
- Blendi Nallbani (born 1971) – football player
- Fatos Nano (born 1952) – former Prime Minister of Albania
- Agim Nesho (born 1956) – former Ambassador
- Daniel Nikolla (born 1993) - a British-Albanian marketing professional, entrepreneur, and community leader
- Essad Pasha (1863/4 or 1875–1920) – politician
- Aleksandër Peçi (born 1951) – composer
- Edi Rama (born 1964) – Prime Minister of Albania
- Jusuf Reçi – Murderer of Avni Rustemi
- Skënder Sallaku (1935–2014) – comic actor
- Klodiana Shala (born 1979) – athlete
- Bamir Topi (born 1957) – former President of Albania
- Abdi bej Toptani (1864–1942) – signatory of the Albanian Declaration of Independence
- Murat bej Toptani (1867–1918) – signatory of the Albanian Declaration of Independence
- Juxhin Xhaja (born 1990) – FIFA football referee
- Ndriçim Xhepa (born 1957) – actor
- Gjergj Xhuvani (1963–2019) – film director
- Zenel Bastari (c. 1767–c. 1837) – Albanian Poet of the Ottoman era.
- Haxhi Ymer Kashari – Albanian Poet of the 18th century.
- Erion Veliaj (born 1979) – Current Mayor of Tirana.
- Ornela Vorpsi (born 3 August 1968), is an Albanian writer and photographer from Tirana.
- Ronela Hajati (born 1989) – singer-songwriter and dancer, Albanian representative at the Eurovision Song Contest 2022
- Ermonela Jaho Albanian operatic soprano (born 1974)
- Beqir Balluku Former Politburo member; accused of organizing a 1974 coup d'état, sentenced to death (1917–1975)
- Tedi Papavrami Albanian Violinist (1969)
- Elvana Gjata Pop singer (1986)
- Anri Sala Filmmaker & contemporary artist (1974)
- Elina Duni Jazz singer (1981)
- Igli Tare Football player (1977)
- Laura Mersini-Houghton Theoretical physicist (1962)
- Shpëtim Duro Football manager (1959)
- Ardit Gjebrea Singer (1962)
- Blendi Fevziu Journalist (1962)
- Evis X. Shaffer Actress (1979)
- Nik Xhelilaj Actor (1983)

== See also ==
- List of Albanians
