= Lindita Arapi =

Albanian writer and journalist

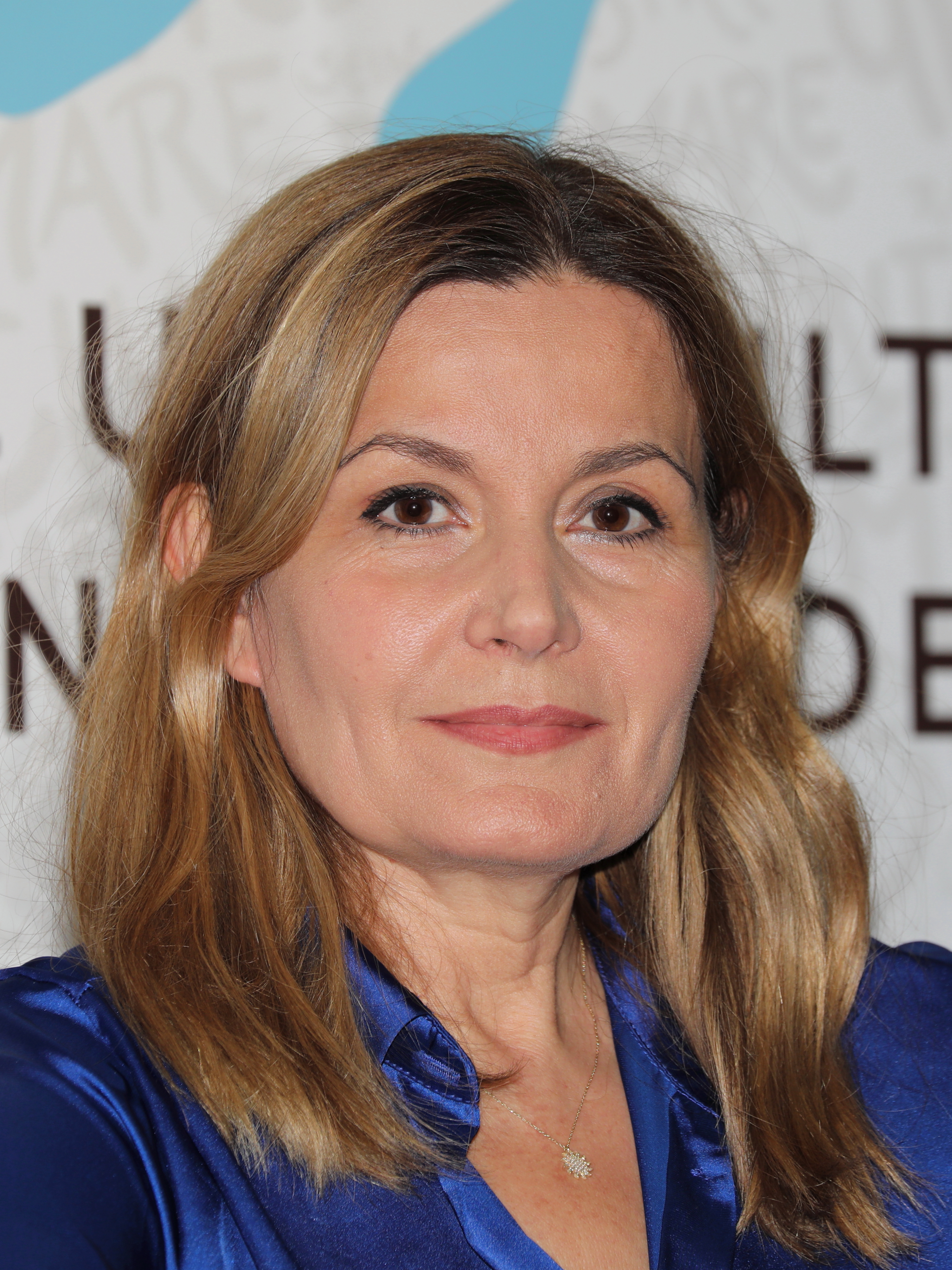
- Arapi in 2023
- Born: 30 June 1972 (age 54); Lushnjë, Albania
- Occupations: writer and journalist
- Writing career
- Language: Albanian

Lindita Arapi (born 30 June 1972) is an Albanian writer and journalist. She is cited as a noteworthy example of a generation of female Albanian writers. Together with her contemporaries, Ervin Hatibi, Agron Tufa, and Rudian Zekthi, Arapi is one of Albania's present-day literary avant-garde writers. She has been living in Germany since the late 1990s, where she has published several volumes of poetry. Her first book of poetry, Am Meer, nachts ("By the sea, at night"; 2007) was the first book of poetry written by a female Albanian poet in German. Her first novel, Vajzat me çelës në qafë (2010), translated into German in 2012, was awarded a Book of the Year prize in Albania.

== Biography ==
Born in Lushnjë, Albania, with family roots from Arapaj a village in Durrës, which explains the surname. Arapi studied the Albanian language and literature at the University of Tirana from 1990 to 1994. In 1993, Arapi published her first book of poems. Three years later, she moved to Germany, where she studied German in Cologne. That same year, 1996, she received a scholarship from the Heinrich Böll Foundation and served as an Honorary Fellow in Writing at the University of Iowa. It was followed by a doctorate in journalism (another source states Cultural Studies) at the University of Vienna. In 2010, she published her first novel, and also translated some German-language texts into Albanian, including poems by Günter Grass, Joseph Roth, Elias Canetti and Felicitas Hoppe. As a journalist, Arapi has worked as a freelance radio editor for the Albanian program of Deutsche Welle, serving as a correspondent in Vienna. She was one of 19 authors featured at the Berlin International Literature Festival in 2012.

Arapi resides in Bonn. She is married and has two daughters.

== Selected works ==
- Kufomë lulesh (1993) (poetry)
- Ndodhi në shpirt (1995) (poetry)
- Melodi te heshtjes (1998) (poetry)
- Wie Albanien albanisch wurde. Rekonstruktion eines Albanienbildes. Vienna, 2001; Buchpublikation: Marburg 2005, ISBN 3-8288-8918-2 (essay)
- Shenjat e dorës (2006) (poetry)
- Am Meer, nachts (2007) ISBN 3-900986-65-7 (poetry)
- Vajzat me çelës (2010), dt. Schlüsselmädchen. Berlin 2012, ISBN 978-3-937717-85-2 (novel)

== See also ==
- Rreze Abdullahu
- Mimoza Ahmeti
- Flora Brovina
- Klara Buda
- Diana Culi
- Elvira Dones
- Musine Kokalari
- Helena Kadare
- Irma Kurti
