= Klara Buda =

French Albanian journalist and writer

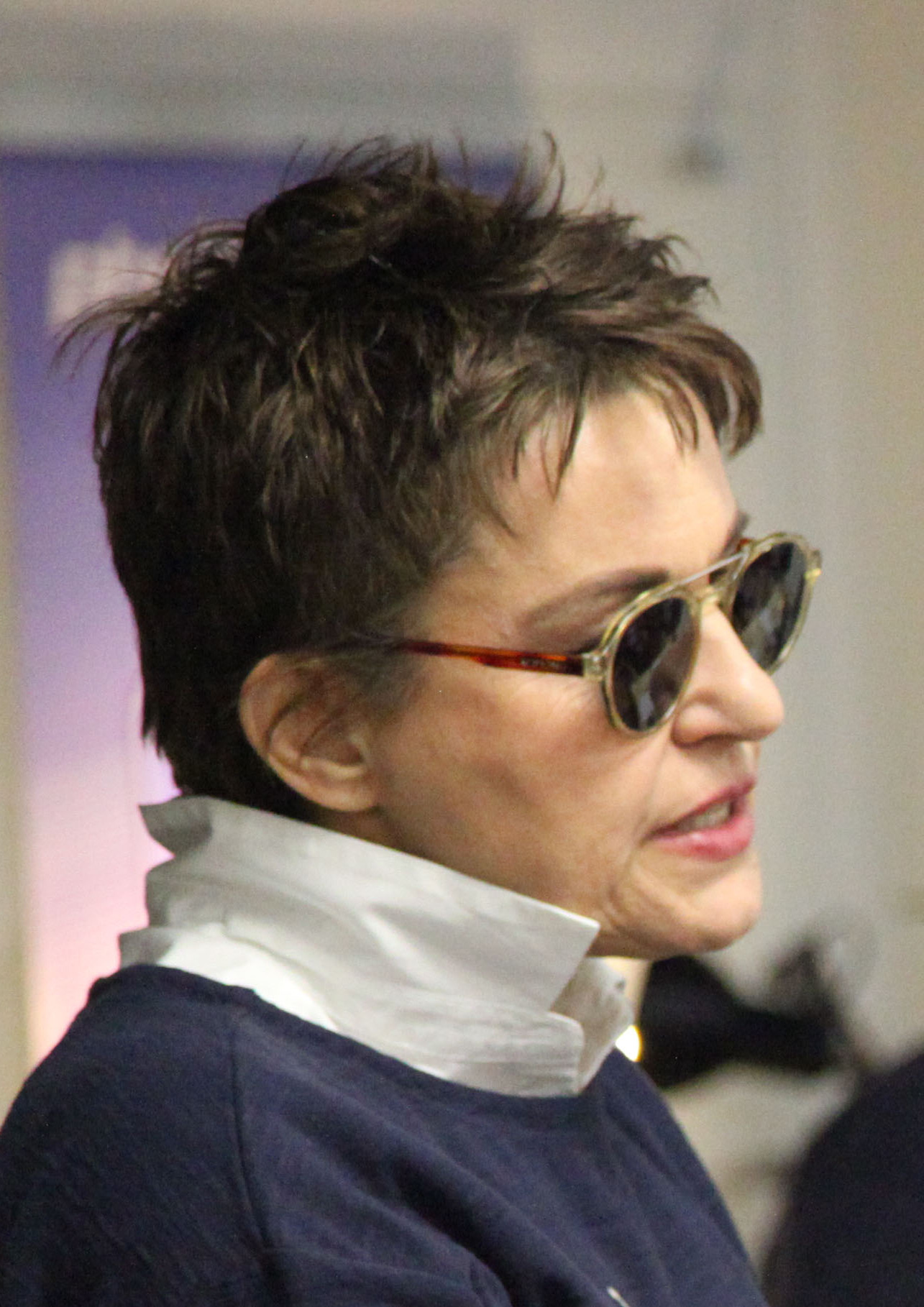
- Buda at Wiki Academy Kosovo, 2018
- Born: Elbasan, Albania
- Education: Sorbonne; École pratique des hautes études
- Occupations: Journalist, writer
- Relatives: Aleks Buda, Athina Buda
- Family: Buda

Klara Buda is a French Albanian journalist and writer. She is the former head of the Albanian Department of Radio France Internationale (RFI), which she left in 2010. Buda has also worked for UNESCO and the BBC. She is of French nationality and Albanian ethnicity. Buda writes prose, poetry, fiction and TV plays.

== Biography ==
Klara Buda was born in Elbasan, Albania. After graduating in modern literature at the Sorbonne, she studied history of art at the École pratique des hautes études. In 1997, she embarked on her career as a freelance journalist at the BBC before joining Radio France Internationale (RFI). She worked for a short period at UNESCO's Communication Division in 1998 but returned to RFI in 1999, first as a specialized journalist, then from 2005 as a principal editor. Appointed editor in chief in 2006, she headed RFI's Albanian department until 2010. She also has a PhD in literary, musical and visual thinking.

In 2011, in New York City, she founded "Beratinus Media", a TV and film production company, and then 2013 she founded Klarabudapost.com, an online site promoting global citizen journalism. She was awarded the Francophone Personality of the Year prize from the Organisation Internationale de la Francophonie in 2013. In 2014, she created, hosted and directed Albania I love You, a TV show, which through portraits of prominent figures examines the evolution of traditional Albanian rites and customs during its period of political transition years, both in Albania itself and internationally. After serving as an external advisor to the Albanian Foreign Affairs Ministry in 2012, in 2015 Buda founded the New York Albanian Cultural Diplomacy Corporation with a view to promoting Albanian culture in the United States.

Her novel Chloroform, set in communist Albania, provides a compelling insight into the regime’s production and reproduction of a new type of human being. It focuses on the oppressive system’s efforts to establish a new kind of society, run by fear." The novel is marked by questions about identity and an exploration of the role of free individuals in totalitarian systems. Buda describes what she calls "islands of inner freedom," which vary from one individual to another but help each of them survive, despite the dictatorship.

== Bibliography ==
- Buda, Klara (2009). Kloroform novel. Botimet "Dudaj". ISBN 978-99943-0-139-3.
- Buda, Klara (2017), Woman Whispering - Novel, UET Mapo Publishing, Tirana, ISBN 978-9928-213-13-6
- Buda, Klara (2017), Kuteli, Short Story - Essay, Ombra GVG Publishing, Tirana, ISBN 978-9928-06-185-0
- Buda, Klara (2016), Kosova Mon Amour - a Collection of essays on Kosova War and Totalitarian Regime in Albania. Publishing Pema, Pristine, March 2017 ISBN 978-9951-721-42-4
- Buda, Klara (2016), They like to drink Raki in my village – Novel by Mitrush Kuteli, translated from Albanian to French. Éditions Fauves, Paris, 2016. ISBN 979-10-302-0046-1
- Buda, Klara (1997), University work - Mitrush Kuteli, Literary Biography in French.

== See also ==
- Rreze Abdullahu
- Mimoza Ahmeti
- Lindita Arapi
- Flora Brovina
- Diana Culi
- Elvira Dones
- Musine Kokalari
- Helena Kadare
- Irma Kurti
- Aleks Buda
