= Flora Brovina =

Albanian women's rights activist (1949–2026)

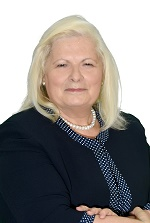
- Born: 30 September 1949; Skenderaj, Yugoslavia
- Died: 15 September 2026 (aged 76)
- Occupation: Politician
- Writing career
- Language: Albanian

Acting Chairwoman of the Assembly of Kosovo
- In office 17 July 2014 – 8 December 2014
- President: Atifete Jahjaga
- Preceded by: Jakup Krasniqi
- Succeeded by: Kadri Veseli

Flora Brovina (30 September 1949 – 15 September 2026) was a Kosovar-Albanian poet, pediatrician and women's rights activist. She was born in the town of Skenderaj in the Drenica Valley of Kosovo, and was raised in Pristina, where she went to school and began studying medicine. After finishing her university studies in Zagreb, where she specialized in pediatrics, she returned to Kosovo and worked for a time as a journalist for the Albanian-language daily newspaper Rilindja. Soon thereafter, she returned to the health care profession and worked for many years in the Pediatrics Ward of the Pristina General Hospital.

== Kosovo war ==
As the political situation in Kosovo deteriorated in the 1990s, and fighting broke out, Brovina ran a health clinic in Pristina in which she distributed health care information on matters as diverse as snake bites, dressing wounds and delivering babies. She also used the centre to shelter a number of orphaned children, many of whom had lost their parents during the fighting and expulsions. She and her fellow workers took care of as many as 25 children at a time.

On 20 April 1999, during the Kosovo War, Brovina was abducted by eight masked Serbia paramilitaries from the home she was staying in and was driven off by car to an initially unknown destination. She was thus in captivity in Serbia when NATO forces took Priština and Serb troops withdrew from the Kosovo province. The first news of her abduction broke on 24 April 1999 when her son managed to contact the international writers’ association, PEN, with an urgent appeal that the news of her abduction be made known as widely as possible. She was transferred to a Serb prison in Požarevac and, in her first month of detention, was subjected to over 200 hours of interrogation in 18 separate sessions lasting typically from 7 A.M. to 5 P.M. On 9 December 1999, in a show trial, she was accused of 'terrorist activities' under Article 136 of the Yugoslav Penal Code. She was sentenced to 12 years in prison. In June 2000, the Supreme Court of Serbia quashed the verdict and ordered a retrial. On 31 October 2000, she was released following international pressure.

== Writing ==
As a writer, Flora Brovina was the author of three volumes of lyric verse. The first collection, Verma emrin tim (Call me by my name), containing 42 verses, was published in Pristina in 1973 when she was a mere twenty-four years old. Six years later, in 1979, the collection Bimë e zë (Plant and voice) followed. It is in this collection that some of the main themes of Brovina's poetry crystallize. Conspicuous among them is the fate of women in society, and in particular the role of women as mothers, as life-givers and nurturers. It is here that births, umbilical cords, amniotic fluid and suckling breasts begin to make their appearance. Along with plants, these are perhaps the most ubiquitous symbols of her verse production. Her third and last collection of original verse, entitled Mat e çmat (With the tape it measures), was published in Pristina in 1995. Mat e çmat appeared at a time when Kosovo was obviously gravitating towards war. Though this third collection cannot be interpreted as political verse to any great extent, there are many poems in the volume which reflect her preoccupation not only with the problems and aspirations of individuals, but also with the fate of her people, with freedom and self-determination.

In 1999, Flora Brovina was recipient of the annual Tucholsky Award of the Swedish PEN Club, a prize which has been awarded to other writers of note such as Salman Rushdie, Adam Zagajewski, Nuruddin Farah, Taslima Nasrin, Shirali Nurmuadov, and Vincent Magombe. She is also the recipient of the PEN/Barbara Goldsmith Freedom to Write Award by PEN American Center and the Human Rights Award of the Heinrich Böll Foundation in Berlin.

A collection of her verse appeared in English in "Flora Brovina, Call me by my Name, Poetry from Kosova" in a bilingual Albanian-English Edition, translated by Robert Elsie, New York: Gjonlekaj 2001.

== Politics ==
After Kosovo was proclaimed independent, Flora Brovina ran for President of Kosovo in 2001 on the list of the Democratic Party of Kosovo (PDK), a surprise candidate instead of the party's leader Hashim Thaci. Since then, she was a Member of the Assembly of Kosovo during each of its legislation period.

== Death ==
Brovina died on 15 September 2026, at the age of 76.

== See also ==
- Rreze Abdullahu
- Mimoza Ahmeti
- Lindita Arapi
- Klara Buda
- Diana Culi
- Elvira Dones
- Musine Kokalari
- Helena Kadare
- Irma Kurti
