= Diana Çuli =

Albanian writer, journalist and politician

- Born: 13 April 1951 (age 75); Tirana, Albania
- Education: University of Tirana
- Occupations: Writer, journalist, politician
- Writing career
- Language: Albanian
- Notable work: Hoteli i drunjtë

Diana Çuli (CHOO-lee) (born 13 April 1951, Tirana) is an Albanian writer, journalist and politician. She graduated from the Faculty of Philosophy of the University of Tirana in 1973. After graduation she joined the editorial boards of Drita and French-speaking magazine Les lettres albanaises. In 1990, she became involved with the democratic opposition and became the head of the Independent Women's Forum, and then joined the Albanian Social Democratic Party.

Since 2006, she has been a representative of Albania in the Parliamentary Assembly of the Council of Europe. In Albania, she works for women's rights, particularly those forced into prostitution. As of 2004 she was the chair of the Albania Women's Federation.

At the end of the 1970s, she published her first short story Ndërgjegja (Conscience). She has published eight novels, and is the author of screenplays for films such as Hije që mbeten pas (1985), Rrethi i kujtesës (1987), and Bregu i ashpër (1988).

== Selected works ==
- 1980: Jehonat e jetës
- 1983: Zëri i largët
- 1986: Dreri i trotuareve
- 1992: Rekuiem
- 1993: ... dhe nata u nda në mes
- 2000: Diell në mesnatë
- 2006: Engjëj të armatosur
- 2009: Gruaja na kafe
- 2011: Hoteli i drunjtë

== See also ==
- Rreze Abdullahu
- Mimoza Ahmeti
- Flora Brovina
- Klara Buda
- Elvira Dones
- Musine Kokalari
- Helena Kadare
- Irma Kurti
