= Pitarka =

Pitarka is an Albanian surname. Notable people with the surname include:

- Bashkim Pitarka (fl. 1986), Albanian diplomat
- Sulejman Pitarka (1924–2007), Albanian actor, writer, and playwright
