= Përcëllesh =

- Village
- Location within Albania
- Coordinates: 41°17′N 19°57′E
- Country: Albania
- County: Tirana
- Municipality: Tirana
- Administrative unit: Petrelë
- Time zone: UTC+1 (CET)
  - Summer (DST): UTC+2 (CEST)

Përcëllesh is a village in the former municipality of Petrelë in Tirana County, Albania. At the 2015 local government reform, it became part of the municipality of Tirana.

== History ==
The Vorpsi family has been recorded in this area as a past settlement of the family before settling in mainland Tirana. The Sina family of Përcëllesh has roots with the Vorpsi family; when they settled and lived together, some Vorpsi members became Sina out of respect, and vice versa.
