= Kadare Prize =

- Awarded for: the best Albanian prose by authors in the albanian-speaking regions of the Balkans and beyond.
- Date: Awarded during the first week of May, preceding the Razma Literary Days festival.
- Location: Razëm
- Country: Albania
- Presented by: Mapo Foundation
- Hosted by: Alfred Lela
- Reward: €10,000
- First award: 2015

The Kadare Prize (Albanian: Çmimi Kadare), established in 2015, is a literary prize awarded annually to a work by an Albanian author. It is named in honour of the Albanian writer Ismail Kadare. Winners are awarded 10,000 euros.

== List of Winners ==
Year	Author	Title	Genre(s)	Country
2015	Rudolf Marku	The Three Divorces of Mr Viktor N.	Novel	United Kingdom
2016	Shkëlqim Çela	Embriology	Novella	United States
2017	Musa Ramadani	The Prophet from Prague	Novel	Kosovo
2018	Virgjil Muçi	Pyramid of Souls	Novel	Albania
2019	Loer Kume	Amigdala Mandala	Short story	Albania
2020	Prize was postponed due to the COVID-19 pandemic			
2021	Gani Mehmetaj	Cuckoo's birds	Novel	Kosovo
2022	Vera Bekteshi	Pusulla të verdha	Novel	Albania
2023	Nurie Emrullai	Duhet të jetë dashuri	Novel	Albania

== Winners ==
=== 2018 ===
Winner

- Virgjil Muçi for his novel Piramida e shpirtrave (Pyramid of Souls)

Juria

- Kim Mehmeti (chair)
- Genciana Abazi
- Agim Baçi
- Ledia Dushi
- Eni Vasili

Shortlist

- Vera Bekteshi - Një rrugë e gjatë pa krye
- Virgjil Muci - Piramida e shpirtrave
- Gazmend Krasniqi - Triologjia e Shkodrës
- Rudina Cupi - Shenjat e pikësimit
- Thanas Dino - Prishja ose Ndërrimi dhe ndalimi

=== 2017 ===
Winner

- Musa Ramadani for his novel “The Prophet from Prague”

Jury

- Bashkim Shehu (chair)
- Agim Baçi
- Ylljet Aliçka
- Ledia Dushi
- Mirela Oktrova

Shortlist

- Musa Ramadani - “Profeti nga Praga”
- Mimoza Ahmeti – “Tutori”
- Ardian Haxhaj – “Vegim”
- Virion Graçi – “800 hapa larg Veneres”
- Arben Kastrati – “I dashuri unë”
- Brajan Sukaj – “Viti i Elefantit”

The winner was announced on 28 May 2017 by Frédéric Mitterrand.

=== 2016 ===
Winner

- Shkëlqim Çela, for his “Embriologji” (Embriology).

Jury

- Agim Baçi
- Preç Zogaj
- Diana Çuli
- Ylljet Aliçka
- Gilman Bakalli
- Rudolf Marku
- Alfred Lela

Shortlist

- Shkëlqim Çela - “Embriologji”
- Bardhyl Londo - “Qyteti i pandehmave”
- Grigor Banushi - “Simfonia e pambaruar”
- Mustafa Nano - “Selam aleikum, baba”
- Ada Çapi - “morPhina”
- Arb Elo - “Ursa Major”
- Pranvera Bekteshi - “Ora me rërë”

=== 2015 ===
Winner

- Rudolf Marku for his novel “Tri divorcet e zotit Viktor N.”

Jury

- Artur Zheji (kryetar jurie)
- Gilman Bakalli
- Gentian Çoçoli
- Ylljet Aliçka
- Alfred Lela
- Preç Zogaj
- Virgjil Muçi

Shortlist

Arti Lushi, Eliona Gjergo, Gazmend Krasniqi, Ilir Bezhani, Primo Shllaku, Shkëlqim Çela, Zija Çela, Shefqet Tigani dhe Rudolf Marku
