= Natasha Lako =

Albanian writer

- Born: May 13, 1948 (age 78)
- Education: Tirana University
- Occupations: Poet, novelist
- Spouse: Mevlan Shanaj
- Children: 2

Natasha Lako (born 13 May 1948) is an Albanian poet and novelist. She belongs to the country's first generation of women writers.

Lako studied political science at Tirana University, specializing in journalism. She has also worked at the New Albania Film Studios in Tirana. Together with Diana Çuli and Helena Kadare, she was one of the few women writers during the Albanian communist regime. From 1991 to 1993, she was elected as a member of the Democratic Party in the coalition government. In 1997, she became the first director of the Albanian Film Archives, working there for a number of years.

Lako, who has also worked as a screenwriter, is married to the Albanian actor and film director Mevlan Shanaj. They have two children, Hera and Joni.

== Works ==
Poetry

- 1972: Marsi brenda nesh (March within us)
- 1979: E para fjalë e botës (The world's first word)
- 1984: Këmisha e pranverës (The spring shirt)
- 1986: Yllësia e fjalëve (Constellation of words)
- 1990: Natyrë e qetë (Quiet nature)
- 1995: Thesi me pëllumba (The bag of doves) Perkthim i Tomas Transtromer ( dy ribotime) Qielli pergjysem dhe Perandoria e barit Lekura e ujit- Permbledhje poetike

2016 Kunderperfyterimi

Novels

- 1977: Stinët e jetës (The seasons of life). Esse Energjia filmike 15 films screenplay
