= Adrian Neritani =

Albanian diplomat

His Excellency Adrian Neritani

11th Permanent Representative of Albania to the United Nations
- In office 2006–2009
- President: Alfred Moisiu; Bamir Topi
- Preceded by: Agim Nesho
- Succeeded by: Ferit Hoxha

Adrian Neritani was the Permanent Representative of Albania to the United Nations. He assumed the position in 2006, replacing Agim Nesho, and remained in it until 2009. Concurrently he served as non-resident ambassador to Cuba.

== Education ==
Neritani received degrees in political science and law from the University of Tirana, Albania. He also has a Master in Diplomacy degree from the Mediterranean Academy of Diplomatic Studies, University of Malta and a Master of Laws (LL.M.) in International Business and Trade Law from the John Marshall Law School in Chicago, Illinois, U.S. He is an attorney, and as of 2005 a member of the New York Bar, in the United States.

== Career ==
Starting in 1989, Neritani was a lecturer at Luigi Gurakuqi University in Shkodër, Albania.

Neritani began his diplomatic career in 1991, when he became in charge of the United States desk at the Ministry of Foreign Affairs of Albania until 1993. Then Regional Officer in charge of China and the Far East from 1993 to 1997. In 1997, he became First Secretary and Chargé d'Affaires at Albanian Embassy in Beijing, China.

In 1999 he left the Ministry to attain his Master of Laws in the United States and starting in 2003, work as a lawyer with the legal firm, Cullison & Cullison, P.C., in Chicago. From 2000 until 2001 he also served as independent consultant on immigration issues, trade and international business.

He was the Permanent Representative of Albania to the United Nations from 2006, replacing Agim Nesho, until 2009. Concurrently he served as non-resident Ambassador to Cuba.
