= Ledia =

Ledia is a given name. Notable people with the name include:

- Ledia Dushi (born 1978) is an Albanian writer and academic
- Ledia Juárez (born 2001) is a Mexican rhythmic gymnast
- Ledia Xhoga, Albanian-American writer
