= Fikas =

- Village
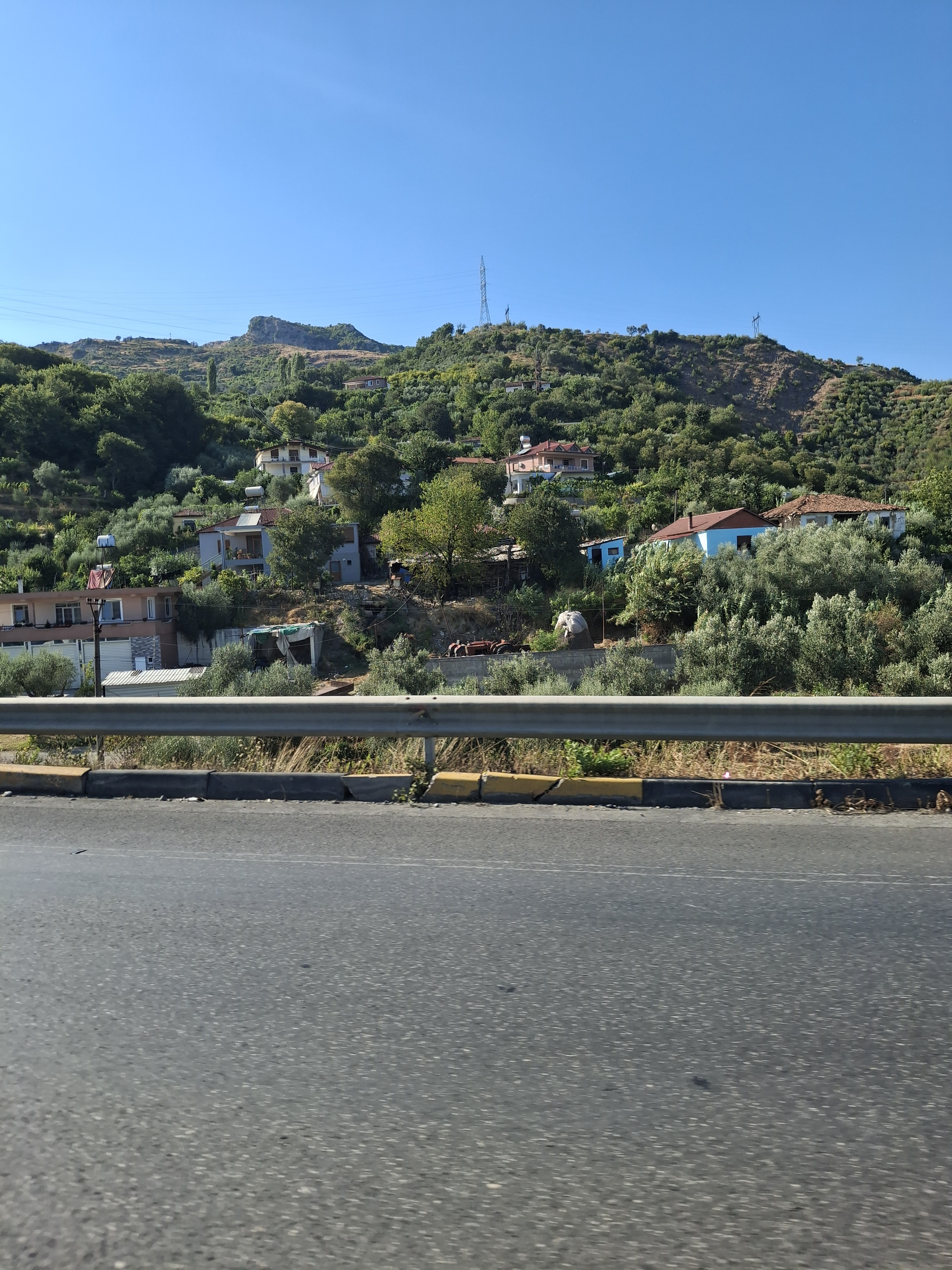
- Fikas seen from the nearby highway

- Location within Albania
- Coordinates: 41°16′N 19°53′E
- Country: Albania
- County: Tirana
- Municipality: Tirana
- Administrative unit: Petrelë
- Time zone: UTC+1 (CET)
  - Summer (DST): UTC+2 (CEST)

Fikas is a village in the former municipality of Petrelë in Tirana County, Albania. At the 2015 local government reform it became part of the municipality Tirana.

The village has been in a heated "religious conflict" for years with the nearby municipal unit of Bradashesh over the placement of a christian cross in a road between the two, placed over the place where the Church of Shën Martini once existed.
