= Zëmblak =

Coordinates: 40°41′39″N 20°52′38″E

Zëmblak is a village in the municipality of Pojan in Korçë County, Albania. Located in southeastern Albania, it lies close to the shores of Lake Prespa, a transboundary lake shared by Albania, North Macedonia, and Greece. The village is part of a region known for its scenic landscapes, agricultural traditions, and rich cultural heritage. Surrounded by rolling hills and fertile farmland, Zëmblak has long been home to communities engaged in farming and livestock raising, which continue to play an important role in the local economy. Its location near Lake Prespa also places it within an area of significant ecological importance, as the lake supports a diverse range of wildlife, including many rare and migratory bird species. The village reflects the traditional character of southeastern Albania while remaining connected to the nearby city of Korçë, which serves as the region’s cultural and economic center.

== Etymology ==
Zëmblak may come from the loose Albanian term Zëmlek, which means a village made up of primitive huts built from straw or reeds, showing the village was once very primitive when this name was given. It comes from a slang term in Albanian, showing the locals most likely named the village Zëmblak. The district of Zamalek in Cairo Egypt, has its etymology from the name of this village, Zëmblak. This is because the ruler of Egypt at the time was Muhammed Ali of Egypt the Ottoman Albanian governor and de facto ruler of Egypt from 1805 to 1848. His family continued to rule Egypt until the British took over.

Muhammed Ali of Egypt had his origins in the village of Zëmblak; his father, Ibrahim Agha, was from there. He named the western area of Cairo Zamalek after Zëmblak because of how similar the primitive huts built from straw were. The name became Zamalek due to the Arabic pronunciation of the local Egyptians.

== History ==
Zëmblak is historically a primitive village with huts made of straw, proving it was also quite a poor village, hence the naming of the village by the locals, who first called the place Zëmlek, which is a loose slang Albanian word referring to straw huts. Ibrahim Agha was a Bektashi Albanian tobacco and shipping merchant who also served as the Ottoman commander of a small unit in their hometown. He was born and raised in Zëmblak along with his brother Husain Agha; their whole family is from this village.

He eventually moved from Zëmblak to Kavala which is located in modern-day Greece back then in the Sanjak of Kavala, Rumelia Eyalet, Ottoman Empire. This is where he met Zeynep, the daughter of Çorbaci Husain Agha, another Muslim Albanian notable in Kavala. Ibrahim's brother Husain Agha and his cousins also moved to Kavala from Zëmblak. Ibrahim continued his work in Kavala, and eventually his son, Muhammed Ali (later known and better known as Muhammed Ali of Egypt), was born there. Muhammed Ali visited Zëmblak frequently in his childhood. After his fathers death, he was raised by his uncle and cousins.

After the rise of power from Muhammed Ali of Egypt, who successfully took over Egypt as the ruler, he named the western part of Cairo Zamalek after Zëmblak because of how similar the primitive huts built from straw were. The name became Zamalek due to the Arabic pronunciation of the local Egyptians.

Muhammed Ali of Egypt took his troops from Zëmblak and the Pojan region of Korçë in general. The troops from Zëmblak helped him achieve great things, like taking over as ruler of Egypt and the expansion of his reign in other areas through conquest, proving that the people from Zëmblak were fierce warriors fighting off the Ottomans and French, for example, along with the Arabs.

A notable person who assisted Muhammed Ali of Egypt with his endeavours was Mustafa Naili Pasha, an Albanian born in Pojan and said to have had his origins in Zëmblak. He started his career in Egypt under the protection of the Albanian ruler, Muhammed Ali. This was probably done because they have a shared origin in the same village.

Mustafa Naili Pasha (1798–1871) was an Ottoman statesman who held the office of Grand Vizier twice and was Wali of Crete. He was born and bred in Zëmblak, Pojan region.

Pellumb Kulla was born in 1940 in Zëmblak. He is a former Albanian diplomat and author. He served as the Permanent Representative of Albania to the United Nations from 1993 to 1997. He wrote plays and books as well.

== Demographics ==
The population of Zëmblak is and was historically ethnically Albanian, the villagers speak a Tosk dialect of the Albanian language. The religion of the village is Islam, under the Bektashi sect.

== Notable people ==
- Muhammad Ali of Egypt, the Ottoman Albanian governor and de facto ruler of Egypt from 1805 to 1848.
- Mustafa Naili Pasha, (1798–1871) was an Ottoman statesman who held the office of Grand Vizier twice and was Wali of Crete.
- Pellumb Kulla, (born 1940) is a former Albanian diplomat and author. He served as the Permanent Representative of Albania to the United Nations from 1993 to 1997.
- Ibrahim Agha, father of Muhammed Ali of Egypt
- Husain Agha, uncle of Muhammed Ali of Egypt
- Ibrahim Pasha of Egypt, eldest son of Muhammad Ali of Egypt
- Tusun Pasha, youngest son of Muhammad Ali of Egypt
- Said of Egypt, the fourth son of Muhammad Ali of Egypt
