= Selbë =

- Village
- Location within Albania
- Coordinates: 41°17′N 19°58′E
- Country: Albania
- County: Tirana
- Municipality: Tirana
- Administrative unit: Dajt
- Time zone: UTC+1 (CET)
  - Summer (DST): UTC+2 (CEST)

Selbë is a village in the former municipality of Dajt in Tirana County, Albania. At the 2015 local government reform, it became part of the municipality of Tirana.

== History ==
The Vorpsi family has been recorded in this settlement, showing they had past roots / settlements here before being in mainland Tirana. The area of "Lugu i Vorpsve" in Selbë adds to this fact, along with the elders of the village having knowledge of such a family once existing there.
