= Thanas Shkurti =

His Excellency Thanas Shkurti

8th Permanent Representative of Albania to the United Nations
- In office 1992–1994
- Preceded by: Bashkim Pitarka
- Succeeded by: Pellumb Kulla

Personal details
- Died: 31 July 2012

Thanas Shkurti (died 31 July 2012) was an Albanian diplomat. He served as Permanent Representative of Albania to the United Nations from 1992 to 1994.

== Biography ==
Shkurti served as Permanent Representative of Albania to the United Nations from 1992 to 1994. He died on 31 July 2012.
