= Picall =

Picallë
- Village
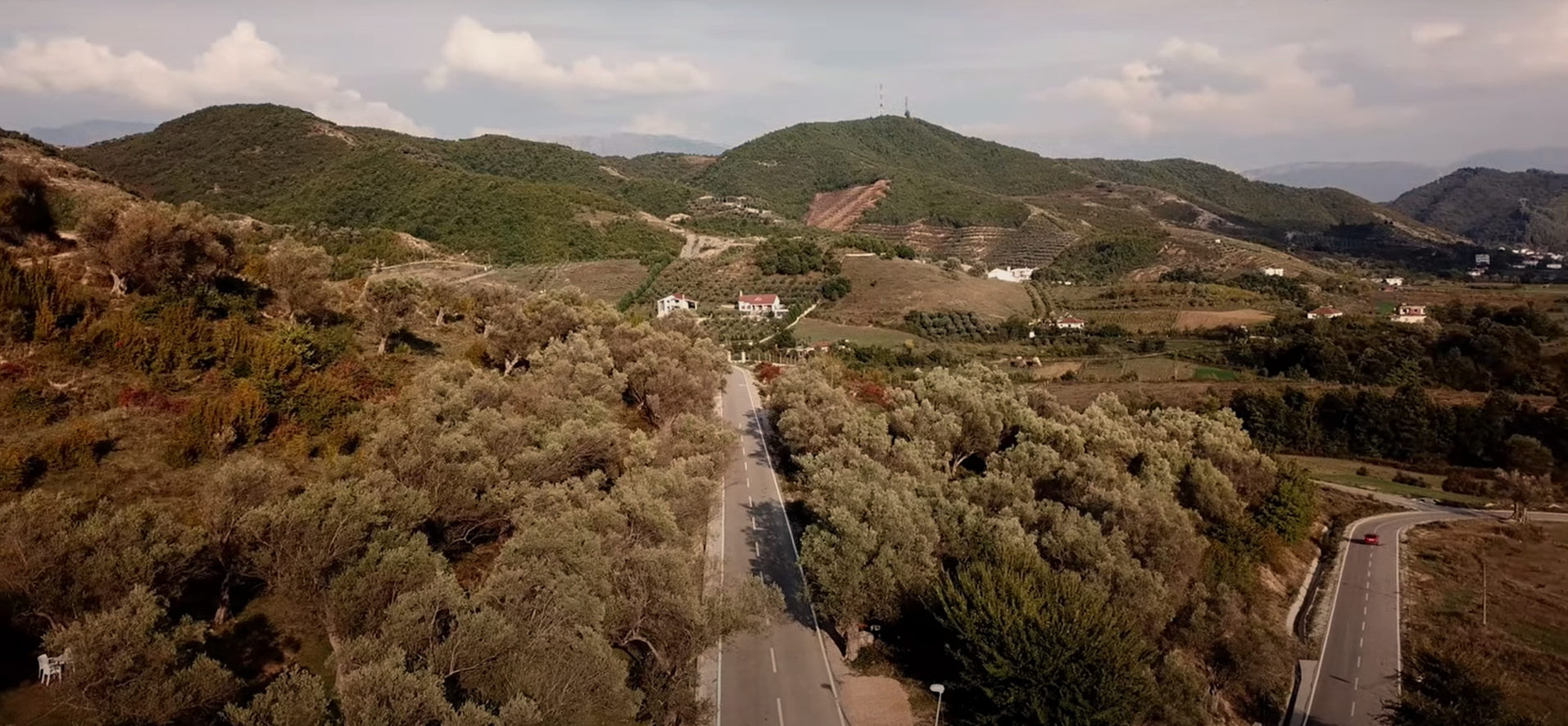

- Location within Albania
- Coordinates: 41°17′N 19°48′E
- Country: Albania
- County: Tirana
- Municipality: Tirana
- Administrative unit: Petrelë
- Time zone: UTC+1 (CET)
  - Summer (DST): UTC+2 (CEST)

Picall is a village in the former municipality of Petrelë in Tirana County, Albania. At the 2015 local government reform it became part of the municipality Tirana.

== Name ==
According to the sayings and legends, there are different versions regarding the origin of the name of the village. The name Picalle derives from the name Pici, of an early administrative or spiritual military leader in that territory, and the place was called the place of Pici or Picalle. This option is also shown as the name of the first resident placed there. He was called Picalli because he heard the saying "we are going to Picalli", and after his death the place took its name Picalle. Later the tribe expanded with other families expanding the village.

== Geography ==
The village is located about 8 kilometers south of Tirana, behind the hills of Lake Tirana. It has an area of 10 km2 and is located 110 meters above sea level. It lies on the banks of the Erzen River on the northern side of the river. It is bordered by the village of Stermas in the east, with the village of Dumje in the south, with the village of Arbane in the west, while behind the hills of the village in the north is the city of Tirana.

Access to the village of Picall (also spelled Picalle or Picallë) is possible from three main points. One route begins on the eastern side of Lake Thata (Lake Garrujsve) and follows a paved road through hilly terrain, requiring approximately 60 minutes to reach the pass between the lapidary monument and the obelisk; this section has little traffic. A second route starts at the last bus stop in Old Sauk and takes about 30 minutes. The third begins near the Farka bridge on the road toward Baldushk. A paved ring road of roughly 15 km encircles the hills of Sauk–Bathore–Stërmas–Picall, which form part of the broader Tirana area adjacent to the Erzen River.

Beyond the pass, the road descends through open hilly terrain into the village. The three oldest and largest family groups in the village are the Dervishi, Qershori, and Stafa, whose houses and associated cemeteries are located on the first three prominent hills. Each group has been present for several generations, with roughly 15–20 families divided into branches, although many members have left the village in the past 20–30 years.

== Clime ==
The village has a subtropical-Mediterranean climate with cold winters and hot summers. The stretch along the Erzen River means that the summer is not hot, with an average July temperature of 24 °C, while the winter is cold, but not with very low temperatures, because the surrounding hills protect it from the cold northern winds. The average temperature in January is 7 °C. About 1,189 mm of rain falls per year.
