= Albanians in France =

Albanians in France Shqiptarët në France
Total population
- 22,100 – 35,000

Regions with significant populations
- Paris · Mulhouse · Marseille · Lyon · Saint-Étienne · Annecy · Gap

Languages
- French, Albanian

Religion
- Islam, Christianity, Irreligious

The Albanians in France constitute an ethnic minority of the country as immigrants. The most Albanians came from Kosovo, North Macedonia, Montenegro, Turkey, Italy and Greece.

== History ==
The Confederation of Albanians in France is an organization of emigrants in France. It was quickly registered by the French authorities. It is in the process that some Albanians were personally addressed by the organization in Albania, either out of fear or rejection of the content, police dangerous letters of their will. A so-called Balkan committee, most of which had personal acquaintance with Albania and Greece, expressed in January 1941 "its deep sympathy with the Albanian people" strongly condemned the Italian aggression and demanded the restoration of full Albanian independence.

== Notable people ==
=== History and politics ===
- Senije Zogu – Albanian princess
- Adile Zogu – Albanian princess
- Perikli Teta – Albanian aircraft engineer and politician

=== University ===
- Albert Doja – Social anthropologist, Member of the National Albanian Academy of Sciences and French University Professor of Anthropology at the University of Lille.

=== Cinema ===
- Arben Bajraktaraj – Albanian actor
- Luana Bajrami-Actress

=== Arts and entertainment ===
- Angelin Preljocaj – French dancer and choreographer of contemporary dance
- Erza Muqoli – French singer

=== Writers ===
- Cizia Zykë (c. 1949–2011) – French writer
- Klara Buda – French Albanian journalist and writer
- Ismail Kadare (1936—2024) – Albanian novelist and poet, winner of the 2005 Man Booker International Prize, the 2009 Prince of Asturias Award, and the 2015 Jerusalem Prize.

=== Sports ===
- Lorik Cana – Albanian former professional footballer
- Albin Hodža – French footballer
- Florent Shehu – French footballer
- Dion Berisha – professional footballer
- Anthony Caci – French footballer

== See also ==
- Albania–France relations
- Albanian diaspora
- Albanian mafia in France
- Immigration to France
