= Reis Malile =

Albanian politician and army officer

Foreign Minister of Albania
- In office 30 June 1982 – 22 February 1991
- Prime Minister: Adil Çarçani
- Preceded by: Nesti Nase
- Succeeded by: Muhamet Kapllani

Ambassador of Albania to China
- In office 1961 – c. 1980
- Prime Minister: Mehmet Shehu

Permanent Representative of Albania to the United Nations
- In office 1958–1961
- Prime Minister: Mehmet Shehu
- Preceded by: Gaqo Paze
- Succeeded by: Halim Budo

Personal details
- Born: 12 August 1924 Gjirokastër, Principality of Albania
- Died: 6 March 2003 (aged 78) Tirana, Albania
- Party: Communist Party of Albania
- Occupation: Politician

Reis Malile (August 12, 1924 – March 6, 2003) was an Albanian politician and army officer. He served as the Foreign Minister of the People's Socialist Republic of Albania from 1982 to 1991. He also led a partisan battalion during World War II and served as the Permanent Representative of Albania to the United Nations from 1958 to 1961.

== Biography ==
Reis Malile was born on 12 August 1924. During World War II, Malile led a partisan battalion active in the Drenica region of Kosovo.

From 1958 to 1961, Malile served as the Permanent Representative of Albania to the United Nations. From 1961, Malile served as the Albanian Ambassador to China, continuing in this post until after the Sino-Albanian split. Malile also served as the Albanian Ambassador to the Democratic Republic of Vietnam in this time.

On 30 June 1982, Malile became the Albanian Foreign Minister. He continued to serve in this post until 22 February 1991, when the communist regime in Albania collapsed.
