= Musa Ramadani =

Musa Ramadani (born 21 May 1944, died 10 March 2020) was a Kosovan novelist and poet of Albanian extraction.

Born in Gjilan in Kosova, Ramadani worked as a journalist for Rilindja. In 1969 he decided to focus on writing literature and since then he has published many volumes of verse, stories and novels. Ramadani was considered one of the leading Albanian prose writers of Kosovo in the last three decades of the 20th century.

In 2017 he was awarded the Kadare Prize for his novel The Prophet from Prague

== Works ==
=== Novels ===
- Romani pa kornizë (1975)
- Zezona (1978)
- Ligatina (1983)
- Vrapuesja e Prizrenit (1995)
- Antiprocesioni (1997)
- Profeti nga Praga (2017)

=== Story collections ===
- Fluroma
- Satana ma vodhi gurin e urtisë
- Inamor: 55 (2000)

== Sources ==
- Elsie, Robert (2004). Historical Dictionary of Kosova. Lanham: Scarecrow Press. ISBN 9780810853096.
