= Gaqo Paze =

Albanian diplomat

His Excellency Gaqo Paze

1st Permanent Representative of Albania to the United Nations
- In office 1955–1958
- President: Haxhi Lleshi as the Chairman of the Presidium of the People's Assembly
- Secretary-General: Dag Hammarskjöld
- Preceded by: Post established
- Succeeded by: Reiz Malile

Gaqo Paze was the first Permanent Representative of Albania (then People's Republic of Albania) to the United Nations, in New York City. He served from 1955 to 1958.

He also served as Ambassador of Albania to Mali, Guinea, and Ghana.
