= Ferit Hoxha =

Albanian diplomat

His Excellency Ferit Hoxha
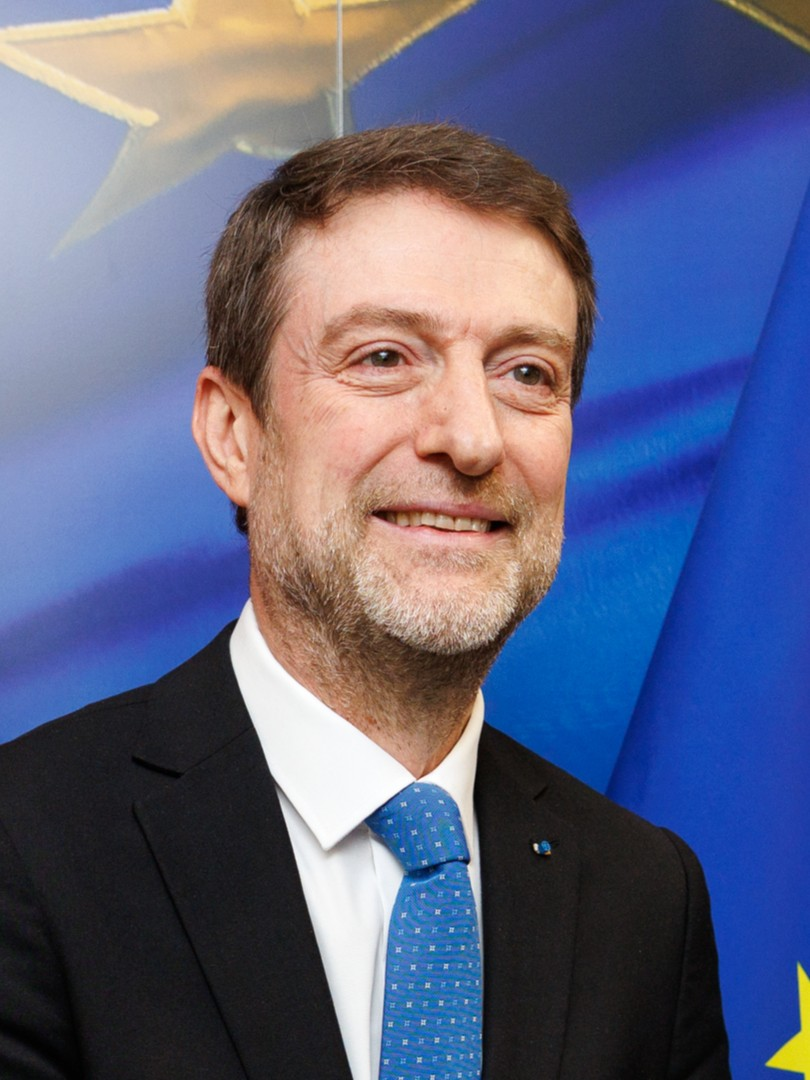
- Hoxha in 2026

Minister for Europe and Foreign Affairs
- Incumbent
- Assumed office 6 March 2026
- Prime Minister: Edi Rama
- Preceded by: Elisa Spiropali

12th Permanent Representative of Albania to the United Nations
- In office 26 October 2021 – February 2024
- President: Ilir Meta; Bajram Begaj
- Secretary-General: António Guterres
- Preceded by: Besiana Kadare

Permanent Representative of Albania to the United Nations
- In office 5 August 2009 – 1 October 2015
- President: Bamir Topi; Bujar Nishani
- Secretary-General: Ban Ki-moon
- Preceded by: Adrian Neritani
- Succeeded by: Besiana Kadare

Personal details
- Born: 22 February 1967 (age 59) Koplik, Albania
- Party: Socialist Party
- Education: University of Tirana

Ferit Hoxha (born 22 February 1967) is an Albanian diplomat serving as the Minister for Europe and Foreign Affairs of Albania. He previously served as Albania's Permanent Representative to the United Nations from 2009 to 2015 and again from 2021 to February 2024.

== Early life and education ==
Hoxha graduated from the University of Tirana in French language and civilization. In 1992, he attended the Netherlands Institute of International Relations at Clingendael in the Hague. In 1998, he attended the Center of International and Security Studies in Maryland, in the United States. In 2007, he attended a course for high level management at Georgetown University.

== Career ==
Hoxha joined the Albanian Ministry of Foreign Affairs in 1991. From 1993 to 1995, he was Deputy Director for Multilateral Cooperation and International Relations in the Ministry of Foreign Affairs in Albania. In 1995, he served as Counselor to the Permanent Mission of Albania to the United Nations in New York. From 1996 to 1998, he was the Director of that department for Multilateral Cooperation and International Relations in the Ministry of Foreign Affairs.

From 1998 to 2001, Hoxha was head of the Mission of Albania to the European Union in Brussels and concurrently Ambassador to Belgium and Luxembourg from 1999 to 2001. From 2001 to 2006, Hoxha was the ambassador to France, and from 2003 to 2006, he was ambassador to Portugal, resident in Paris. From 2001 to 2007, he was personal representative of the head of state to the Permanent Council of the International Organization of la Francophonie.

Between 2006 and 2009, he was secretary general of the Ministry of Foreign Affairs. During this time he served also as national coordinator for the Alliance of Civilizations and national coordinator for the Barcelona Process–Union for the Mediterranean, a position he held since 2008. From September 2007 to September 2009, he was also Albania's governor to the International Atomic Energy Agency (IAEA) Board of Governors.

He was the Permanent Representative of Albania to the United Nations, in New York City, from 2009 to 2015, when he was succeeded by Besiana Kadare. He was then director general for political and strategic issues at the Ministry of Foreign Affairs of Albania from 2015 to 2021. He returned to the United Nations as permanent representative in October 2021. For the month of June 2022, Hoxha served as president of the United Nations Security Council, succeeding United States ambassador Linda Thomas-Greenfield, who served as UNSC president for May 2022.

== Distinctions ==
Hoxha was awarded the title of "Grand Officier de l'Ordre du Mérite" of the French Republic. He was bestowed the title "Ufficiale del Ordine dela Stella d'Italia". He was awarded the title "Personnalité Francophone" by the Minister of Foreign Affairs of Albania, for the year 2007.
