= Pëllumb Kulla =

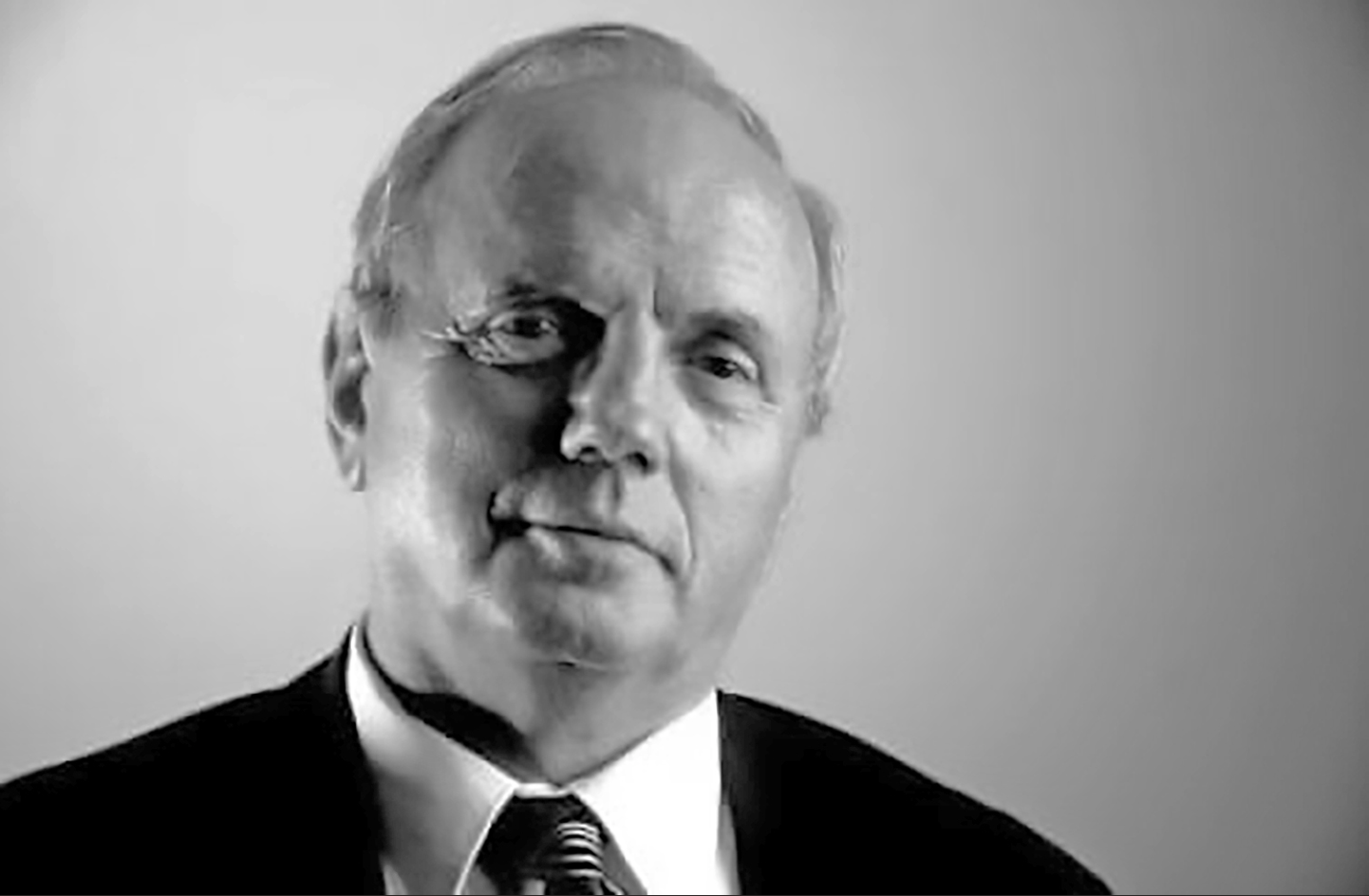

Personal details
- Born: 10 January 1940 (age 86) Zëmblak, Albania
- Spouse: Xhuljeta Strumi
- Children: Era Kulla Makoci, Fllad Kulla, Ditbardh Kulla
- Education: Faculty of Stage Art at the Institute of High Arts (now the Albanian Academy of Arts)
- Occupation: 9th Permanent Representative of Albania to the United Nations from 1993 to 1997 Predecessor: Thanas Shkurti Succeeded by: Agim Nesho
- Profession: Writer, Producer, Publicist

Pëllumb Kulla (born 10 January 1940) is a former Albanian diplomat, writer, playwright, satirist, and professor. Kulla was a prominent figure in the field of stage, serving as a professor and later as the Dean of the Faculty of Stage Art at the Academy of Arts, University of Tirana. He was honored with the Presidential Order "Grand Master of the Arts" for his contributions to the arts. In addition to his academic and administrative roles, Kulla also had a distinguished diplomatic career, serving as the Secretary for Culture and Press at the Embassy of Albania in Bonn, Germany, and later as the Permanent Representative of Albania to the United Nations from 1993 to 1997.

As an author, Kulla wrote more than 31 published titles, focusing on portraying the communist era of Albania with a sharp satirical angle. He was also a prolific stage director at the Fier Theater, where his contributions helped elevate the theater to national prominence. He wrote the libretto and directed fifteen performances, which were widely successful nationally. Kulla's writing extended to over 300 sketches and one-act comedies, 40 couplets, and 23 monologues, many of which were featured on Albanian Radio and Television. His extensive contributions to the stage are compiled in seven volumes, published under the title "Theater, This Game of Magic," with funding from the Municipality of Fier.

professor of Stage Arts, Dean of the Faculty of Stage Art (Academy of Arts, University of Tirana), and a recipient of the Presidential Order "Grand Master of the Arts". He also served as a diplomat, holding the position of Secretary for Culture and Press at the Embassy of Albania in Bonn (Germany) and then later appointed as the Permanent Representative of Albania to the United Nations from 1993 to 1997.

== Early life and education ==
Pëllumb Kulla was born in born in Zëmblak in 1940. The village was under Italian fascist occupation before coming under German control during World War II. The period from 1940 to 1950 in his birthplace village was marked by harsh persecution, including executions and imprisonment of family members. His grandfather, Rrapo Kulla, was executed in 1945, and his uncle Ridvan was among those imprisoned.

In 1951, Kulla's family moved to Tirana, where he completed his higher education, obtaining a diploma from the Technical High School. He encountered Enver Hoxha in 1960, who assured him that no obstacles would hinder his pursuit of higher education. Kulla was then able to pursue further studies at the Faculty of Stage Art.

== Career ==
After graduation, Kulla faced difficulties in Vlorë, where he was initially appointed as the stage director of the new theater's comic troupe but was later excluded from the ranks of other local artists.

From 1972 to 1990, Kulla's career flourished. He excelled in theater and television, became a notable pedagogue, and collaborated with distinguished creators across the country. He produced many theatrical pieces, which were well-received both nationally and internationally. Despite his anti-communist background, Kulla expressed his worldview through his work. He received awards for his contributions to theater, television, and literature, including the Naim Frashëri Order in 1987.

In 1990, Kulla left Fier to work as an educator in Tirana and later transitioned to a diplomatic career.

=== Diplomacy ===
In 1992, Kulla entered the diplomatic arena of the post-communist state. He began as the Secretary for Culture and Press at the Embassy of Albania in Bonn, a position he held during the initial months of the newly unified Germany's capital. A year later, he was appointed Ambassador to the Albanian Mission to the United Nations, based in New York, USA, where he served from 1993 to 1997. During his time in this role, the focus was on Kosovo's independence and the challenges posed by the pyramid schemes that plagued post-Enverist Albania, which was governed by inexperienced officials. This period coincided with heavy UN involvement in managing the Balkans' situation, culminating in international military intervention in the region.

== Works ==
- LIPE SHTOGU IS IN THE LIST," short plays for stage and TV (1980)
- "COMRADE NIQIFOR," comedy (1980)
- "PORTRAITS WITHOUT MAKEUP," stories and scenic miniatures (1984)
- "MALO'S WEDDING" miniatures (1986)
- "ADVICE FOR CHILDREN FROM 5 TO 55 YEARS OLD," stories (1989)
- "SKENDER SALLAKU: HOW WE LAUGHED UNDER DICTATORSHIP," Essay (2002)
- "TALES OF AMERICA," novel (2003)
- "THE STORKS SHALL NEVER RETURN" novel (2005)
- "THE INVASION OF AMERICA" selected stories (2005)
- "THEATER, THIS ENCHANTING GAME," volumes from the magic stage (2007)
- "THE DEATH OF ENVER HOXHA," many novels in one (2008)
- "A BRIDE IS ABDUCTED IN NEW YORK," selected stories (2012)
- "NOT ALL THE DEAD REST IN PEACE," autobiography (2012)
- "ENDLESS WAR," selected publicistic writings (2013)
- "THEATER, THIS ENCHANTING GAME – volumes 4, 5, 6, 7 (2011-19)
- "HANDS AND KNIVES," drama (2018)
- "MY DREAMY RINA," comedy (2018)
- "THE DICTATORSHIP OF MONEY," satirical selection (2020)
- "I, THE TROUBLEMAKER," satirical selection (2021)

=== Plays ===
==== Full-length ====
- "A Light Won't Let Me Sleep" (1966)
- "The Mad Island" (1967 – 1992)
- "The Wolf of the Fairytale" (1972 – 1990)
- "Comrade Niqifor" (1979)
- "Two Gunshots in Paris" (1980)
- "Snowflakes in April" (1984)
- "Many Dry Leaves That Autumn!" (1989)
- "Beautiful Old House" (1989)
- "The Log" (2003)
- "The Millionaire" (2010)
- "Someone Has to Die" (2011)
- "The House of the Endless Yesterday" (2013)
- "My Dreamy Rina" (2018)
- "Hands and Knives" (2018)

==== One-act ====
- "Lipe Shtogu" (1970)
- "Airplanes and Counterfeits" (1972)
- "The Long Sleep" (1977–1996)
- "Fleeing Ministers" (1980)
- "Asaf Lala Wants to Resign" (1980)
- "New Telephone at Home" (1981)
- "Woman on a Business Trip" (1985)
- "The First Prize" (1986)
- "The Watermelon Seeds" (1987)
