= Maksim Konomi =

Albanian politician (born 1946)

Maksim Konomi (born August 13, 1946, in Tirana) was the chairman of the Committee for Science and Technology for Albania in the 1992 government of Sali Berisha. He is a member of the Democratic Party.
