= Bashkim Pitarka =

Albanian politician and diplomat (born 1942)

His Excellency Bashkim Pitarka

7th Permanent Representative of Albania to the United Nations
- In office 1986–1991
- Preceded by: Xhustin Papajorgji
- Succeeded by: Thanas Shkurti

Personal details
- Born: 6 September 1942 (age 83) Durrës, Albania
- Spouse: Sadije Pitarka
- Relations: Sulejman Pitarka (brother)

Bashkim Pitarka (born 6 September 1942) is an Albanian politician and diplomat. He served as Permanent Representative of Albania to the United Nations from 1986 to 1991.

== Biography ==
Pitarka was born in Durrës on 6 September 1942. He was a member of the Albanian Labor Party.

Pitarka served as Permanent Representative of Albania to the United Nations from 1986 to 1991. In October 1989 he called for the dispersal of the NATO and the Warsaw Treaty military alliances.

In September 1990, after a series of talks with the United States to establish diplomatic relations after a break of 51 years, Pitarka said: "We have crossed our fingers. We are ready and we are waiting for a reply. We are waiting for the last O.K. from the President of the United States. We are ready to begin tomorrow." Bashkim is the youngest brother of Albanian People's Artist Sulejman Pitarka.
