= Besiana Kadare =

Albanian diplomat

Her Excellency Besiana Kadare
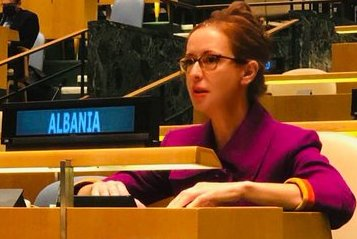
- Besiana Kadare in the UN General Assembly hall

Vice-President of the 75th UN General Assembly
- In office 16 September 2020 – 14 September 2021
- President: Volkan Bozkir
- Secretary-General: António Guterres

13th Permanent Representative of Albania to the United Nations
- In office 30 June 2016 – 1 October 2021
- President: Bujar Nishani; Ilir Meta
- Secretary-General: Ban Ki-moon; António Guterres
- Preceded by: Ferit Hoxha
- Succeeded by: Ferit Hoxha

Albanian non-resident Ambassador to Cuba
- In office 30 June 2016 – 1 October 2021
- President: Bujar Nishani; Ilir Meta
- Preceded by: Ferit Hoxha
- Succeeded by: Ferit Hoxha

Personal details
- Born: 1972 (age 53–54) Tirana, Albania
- Parents: Ismail Kadare (father); Helena Kadare (mother)
- Education: Paris IV-Sorbonne University

Besiana Kadare (born 1972) is an Albanian diplomat. She served as the Ambassador Extraordinary and Plenipotentiary Permanent Representative of Albania to the United Nations, a vice president of the United Nations General Assembly for its 75th session, and Albania's ambassador to Cuba. Albania sat on the UN Security Council for a two-year term, 2022–23. She was formerly from 2011 to 2016 Albania's Ambassador Extraordinary and Plenipotentiary and Permanent Delegate to the United Nations Educational, Scientific and Cultural Organization (UNESCO) in Paris.

== Early life and education ==
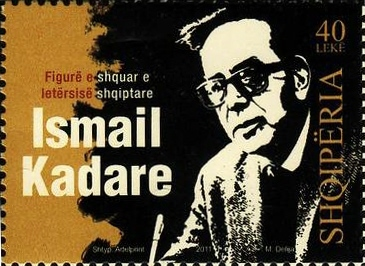
Besiana's father, writer Ismail Kadare, on an Albanian postal stamp.

Kadare is the daughter of writers Helena Kadare and Ismail Kadare.

Kadare holds a master's degree in modern and comparative literature, and a specialized high studies diploma in modern specialized literature from the Sorbonne Paris-IV University in Paris, France.

== Career ==
=== Early years ===
Kadare served as First Secretary at Albania's Permanent Mission to the United Nations in New York from 2002 to 2005. She returned to Albania in 2005 to work with the United States Agency for International Development (USAID).

In 2008, Kadare served in Albania's Embassy in France.

Between 2011 and 2016, she served as Albania's Ambassador Extraordinary and Plenipotentiary and Permanent Delegate to the United Nations Educational, Scientific and Cultural Organization (UNESCO) in Paris.

=== Permanent Representative of Albania to the United Nations ===
Kadare presented her credentials to UN Secretary-General Ban Ki-moon on 30 June 2016, and since then has been the Ambassador Extraordinary and Plenipotentiary Permanent Representative of Albania to the United Nations in New York. She is Albania's first female Ambassador to the UN, in the country's 65 years of UN membership. She was appointed to serve concurrently as Albania's Ambassador to Cuba.

In October 2017, at a UN Security Council meeting, Kadare said that the meaningful inclusion of women in conflict prevention and peace processes remained negligible, with women being sidelined during peace negotiations even when they were present, as it was always men who led and decided when and how to make peace. She urged that member states increase their commitment to fully integrate women in their peace and security agenda.

In 2018 Muslim-majority Albania co-hosted an event at the United Nations with Catholic-majority Italy and Jewish-majority Israel celebrating the translation of the Talmud into Italian for the first time. Ambassador Kadare opined: "Projects like the Babylonian Talmud Translation open a new lane in intercultural and interfaith dialogue, bringing hope and understanding among people, the right tools to counter prejudice, stereotypical thinking and discrimination. By doing so, we think that we strengthen our social traditions, peace, stability — and we also counter violent extremist tendencies."

In January 2019 Kadare on behalf of Albania co-hosted together with the World Jewish Congress and the United Nations Department of Global Communications an event on the theme "A story of humanity: the rescue of Jews in Albania". She delivered remarks at the United Nations at a briefing entitled "Holocaust Remembrance: Demand and Defend your Human Rights", marking International Holocaust Remembrance Day and reflecting on the genocide of six million European Jews during World War Two, and the little-known record of Albanians during the Holocaust in Albania, which took in thousands of Jews who would otherwise have ended up in the Nazi death camps.

Kadare in December 2019 called the decision to award Austrian writer Peter Handke, widely regarded as a denier of genocide, the 2019 Nobel Prize in Literature "shameful," saying it should forever haunt the Nobel Foundation.

Speaking in May 2021 at the UN General Assembly, while calling for a ceasefire on an outbreak of fighting between Gaza and Israel, Kadare said: "The indiscriminate firing of rockets against civilian areas from Hamas and other terrorist groups is absolutely unacceptable. This must stop immediately. There is no justification, ever, for targeting civilians indiscriminately. Like all countries in the world, Israel has the right to live in peace and to guarantee the security of its civilian population, when threatened by violent actions or attack. Like all countries in the world, it is imperative that this right to self-defense is exercised proportionately and in full compliance with international law."

Albania was voted to become a member of the 15-country UN Security Council for a two-year term, in 2022-23, on 11 June 2021. Kadare said that Albania's priorities in the Security Council were to include a focus on women, peace, and security, promoting human rights and international law, preventing conflicts, protecting civilians, countering violent extremism, addressing climate change and its links to security, and strengthening multilateralism and the rules-based international order. She tweeted thanks to all countries that "entrusted us with this huge responsibility."

==== Vice President of the United Nations General Assembly ====
In June 2020 Kadare was voted a vice president of the United Nations General Assembly for its 75th session.

== Other activities ==
- United Nations Office for Project Services (UNOPS), vice president of the executive board
- United Nations Population Fund (UNFPA), vice president of the executive board
