= Sulejman Pitarka =

Albanian actor (1924–2007)

- Born: 2 February 1924; Diber, Principality of Albania
- Died: 24 March 2007 (aged 83); Tirana, Albania
- Occupations: Actor, writer
- Years active: 1945–2005
- Spouse: Meri Pitarka
- Awards: People's Artist

Sulejman Pitarka (2 February 1924 – 24 March 2007) was an Albanian actor, writer, and playwright. His family moved to Durrës, Albania, when he was five. His brother was Bashkim Pitarka, who became an Albanian diplomat.

He was active in films and in the National Theater of Albania in Tirana. He was awarded the People's Artist of Albania.

== Filmography ==
Pitarka on a 2026 stamp of Albania

- Loin des barbares - (1994)
- Vdekja e burrit - (1991)
- Historiani dhe kameleoni - (1989)
- Nata e parë e lirisë - (1984)
- Në prag të lirisë - (1981)
- Shtëpia jonë e përbashkët - (1981)
- Goditja (1980)
- Ballë për ballë - (1979)
- Gjeneral gramafoni - (1978)
- Pas gjurmëve - (1978)
- Gunat mbi tela - (1977)
- Tinguj lufte - (1976)
- Horizonte të hapura - (1968)
- Debatik - (1961)
- The Great Warrior Skanderbeg - (1953)
- Nxenesit e klases sime - (1984)
