= Albania and the United Nations =

Republic of Albania

United Nations membership
- Membership: Full member
- Since: 14 December 1955
- Former name(s): People's Republic of Albania (1955–1976); People's Socialist Republic of Albania (1976–1991)
- UNSC seat: Non-permanent
- Permanent Representative: Ferit Hoxha

The People's Socialist Republic of Albania joined the United Nations on 14 December 1955, and has participated in several UN peacekeeping operations. The current Representative of Albania in the UN is Mr. Ferit Hoxha. Albania was a non-permanent member of the 15-country UN Security Council for a two-year term (2022–2023).

== History ==
=== 1955–99 ===
After joining in 1955, Albania started to apply for membership in other organisations of the United Nations. On 16 October 1958 Albania became a permanent member of UNESCO.

From the 1960s onwards, the People's Republic of Albania under Enver Hoxha moved an annual resolution in the General Assembly to expel the "representatives of Chiang Kai-shek" (an implicit reference to the ROC) and permit the People's Republic of China (PRC) to represent China at the UN. Albania played an important role in the process of recognizing the PRC as "the only legitimate representative of China to the United Nations" through United Nations General Assembly Resolution 2758, which was adopted on 25 October 1971.

In November 1973 Albania joined the Food and Agriculture Organization.

During 12–13 May 1990 the UN Secretary-General Javier Pérez de Cuéllar visited Albania.

In 1992 the Convention on the Rights of the Child was ratified by Albania, marking important progress on the human rights record of the newly democratic country.

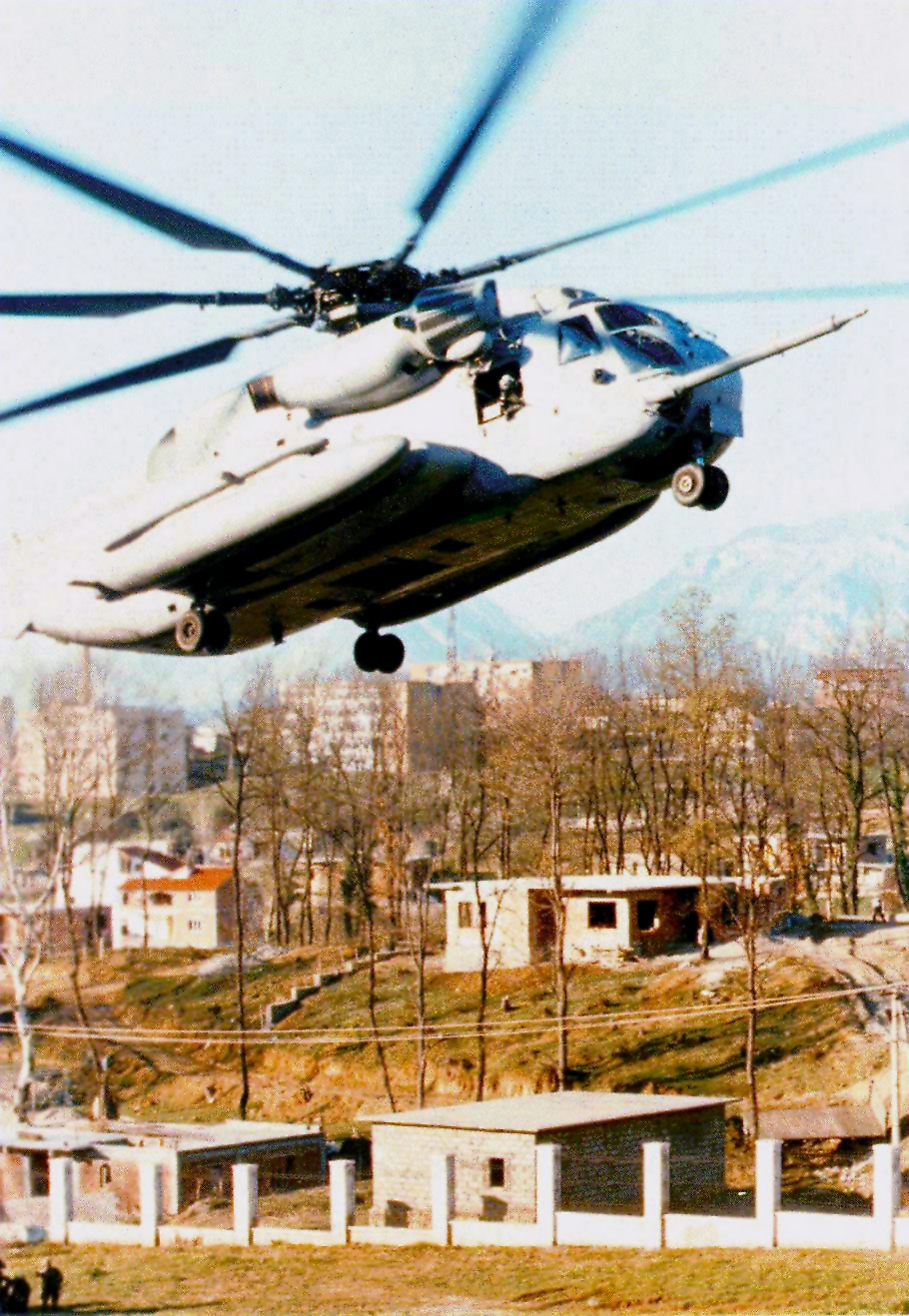
Evacuations in the Albanian capital of Tirana after Resolutions 1101 and 1114

In 1994 another resolution was prepared and introduced by the Albanian delegation to the UN, this time about the "Situation of Human Rights in Kosovo". Albania served as the main sponsor of the resolution, which was adopted with a clear majority of the UN membership. In 1995 the Permanent Representative of the Republic of Albania to the UN was elected vice president of the 50th session of the UN General Assembly.

After the 1997 rebellion in Albania, the UN adopted United Nations Security Council Resolution 1101 on 28 March 1997, after reiterating its concern over the situation in Albania. The Security Council established a multinational protection force in the country to create conditions to facilitate humanitarian assistance. On 19 June 1997 after recalling Resolution 1101 on the situation in Albania, the council authorized an extension to the multinational force in the country for a further 45 days, beginning on 28 June 1997 through United Nations Security Council Resolution 1114.

=== 2000–present ===
In 2005 Albania was elected for the first time a member of the United Nations Economic and Social Council, for a two-year term until 2007, and in 2012 reelected for the second time. In 2013 it also served as vice president of the ECOSOC.

During 2007–09 it was member of the governing board of the International Atomic Energy Agency.

On October 21, 2014, Albania joined the United Nations Human Rights Council for the term 2015–17, and was elected vice-president of its Bureau for 2015.

Ambassador Besiana Kadare presented her credentials to UN Secretary-General Ban Ki-moon in 2016, and since then has been the Ambassador Extraordinary and Plenipotentiary Permanent Representative of Albania to the United Nations in New York. On 27 January 2019, marking International Holocaust Remembrance Day, Kadare co-hosted together with the World Jewish Congress and the United Nations Department of Global Communications a conference titled "A Story of Humanity: The Rescue of Jews in Albania." In June 2020 Kadare was voted a vice president of the United Nations General Assembly for its 75th session.

Albania was voted to become a member of the 15-country UN Security Council for a two-year term, in 2022–23. Kadare said Albania's priorities in the Security Council will include a focus on women, peace, and security, promoting human rights and international law, preventing conflicts, protecting civilians, countering violent extremism, addressing climate change and its links to security, and strengthening multilateralism and the rules-based international order. The election took place on June 11, 2021.

== Peacekeeping missions ==
Albania has participated in the following peacekeeping missions led by the UN:

Country	Current Mission	Organization	No. of personnel
(Georgia (country)) Georgia	UNOMIG	United Nations	39 military observers
Ivory Coast	UNOCI	United Nations
Liberia	UNMIL	United Nations
(Central African Republic) CAR, Chad	MINURCAT	United Nations	63 troops
South Sudan	UNMISS	United Nations

== Representatives ==
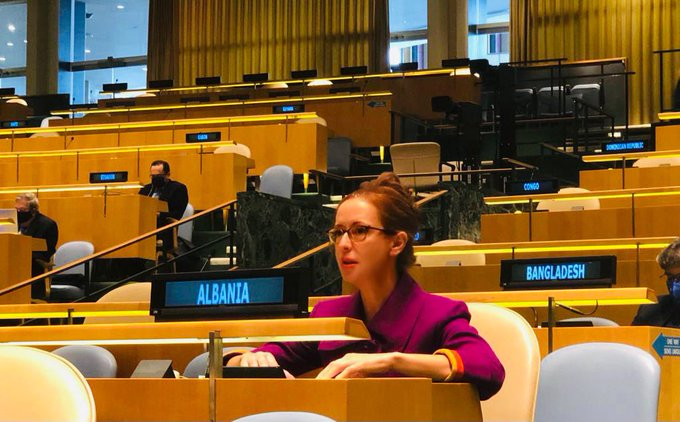
Ambassador Besiana Kadare in the UN General Assembly Hall

No.	Name	Term served
1	Gaqo Paze	1955	1958
2	Reis Malile	1958	1961
3	Halim Budo	1961	1970
4	Sami Baholli	1970	1977
5	Abdi Baleta	1977	1983
6	Justin Papajorgji	1983	1986
7	Bashkim Pitarka	1986	1992
8	Thanas Shkurti	1992	1994
9	Pëllumb Kulla	1993	1997
10	Agim Nesho	1997	2006
11	Adrian Neritani	27 April 2006	2009
12	Ferit Hoxha	5 August 2009	1 October 2015
13	Besiana Kadare	30 January 2016	1 October 2021
14	Ferit Hoxha	26 October 2021	4 April 2024
15	Suela Janina	5 April 2024	incumbent

== See also ==
- Foreign relations of Albania
