= Agim Nesho =

Albanian American diplomat, author, and political analyst, born 1956

Agim Nesho (born in 1956) is an Albanian American diplomat, author, and political analyst. He served as Permanent Representative of Albania to the United Nations between 1996 and 2005, and Ambassador to the United States from 2005 to 2006.

== Biography ==
Nesho was born in Tirana, Albania.

He served as the 10th Permanent Representative of Albania to the United Nations between 1996 and 2005. Nesho then served as ambassador to the United States from 2005 to 2006.
