= Ornela Vorpsi =

Albanian photographer and writer

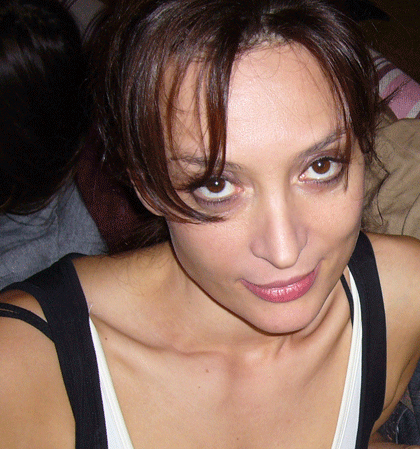
- Born: 3 August 1968 (age 58); Tirana, PR Albania
- Education: Academy of Fine Arts of Brera
- Occupations: Writer, photographer
- Family: Vorpsi family

Ornela Vorpsi (born 3 August 1968, Tirana), is an Albanian writer and photographer from the Vorpsi family in Tirana. Ornela studied at the Academy of Fine Arts of Brera in Milan, and has been living and working in Paris since 1997. An excerpt of her novel The Country Where One Never Dies was included in Best European Fiction 2010, edited by Aleksander Hemon and prefaced by Zadie Smith.

== Novels ==
- 2001 – Nothing Obvious
- 2003 – The Country Where One Never Dies
- 2006 – Pink Glass
- 2007 – The hand that does not bite
- 2010 – Drink Cocoa van Houten!
- 2012 – Fuorimondo
- 2015 – Travel Around the Mother
