= Vorpsi family =

Albanian family

The Vorpsi are an Albanian family associated with Tirana. The family name is recorded in Ottoman registries in Tirana from 1650, with Islam Vorpsi identified as the first recorded bearer. The family was historically Muslim.

Notable family members include Ornela Vorpsi (born 3 August 1968, Tirana), an Albanian writer and photographer. Ornela studied at the Academy of Fine Arts of Brera in Milan, and has been living and working in Paris since 1997. In 2012 she was named one of the 35 best writers of Europe in Best European Fiction by Aleksander Hemon and Zadie Smith. Artiola Toska, a famous Albanian singer today, is also a member of the Vorpsi family. Ismail Kadare has mentioned the family name in his literature. Several roads Tirana are also associated with the family name, including Rruga Vorpset, which is specifically named after the Vorpsi.

== Origins and History ==
The Vorpsi are said to originate from the region of Martanesh, where they formed several settlements before migrating to Tirana. The Vorpsi family have been recorded in the villages of Tirana before it was established as a city in 1614 by Ottoman Albanian ruler Sulejman Bargjini. The etymology of the surname is disputed: according to one theory, it is derived from the Albanian word "Vorbull", which means "whirlpool", which would imply a link to the pottery industry as an occupational surname. Alternatively, the name may be derived from the word "Vorbatine", in reference to the Mountain of Vorbatines in north Albania, where the family had its ancient roots. However, the former theory is regarded as the most probable.

The family converted to Islam in the late 1500s or early 1600s, during the Islamization of Albania in the Ottoman Empire. The family were involved in Albanian blood feuds and this led to one family member moving to Kosovo and another to Shkodra. Due to the family taking part in Kanun another theory of origin of the family is from Malesia but is not proven as of now. In the 1800s there was also an migration to Istanbul from a singular member of the family. In 1912 Ramazan Vorpsi killed 12 Serbian soldiers during the Balkan wars when Albania was being invaded by Serbia. He was ambushed and killed by Serbs in Lezhe. He was fighting for the Albanian state to be independent and created.
