= Fabiola Laço Egro =

Albanian activist

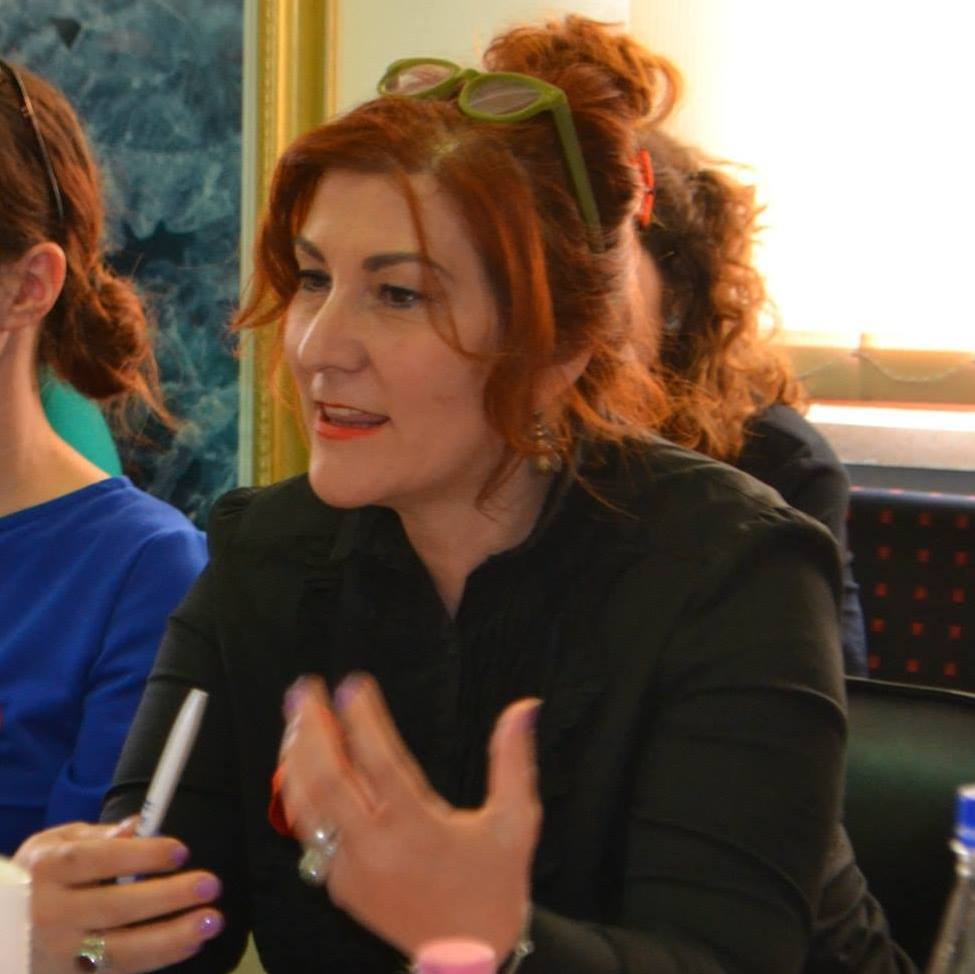
Fabiola Laco Egro Civil Society Activist for gender equality, women's rights and empowerment, Albania

Fabiola Laço Egro (born 1963) is one of the prominent activists of civil society dating back to the beginning of the civil movement for women's rights in Albania in the 1990s. She is founder and leader of "Today for the Future" Network for community development in Albania.

== Life and career ==
Born to an intellectual family in Tirana, she had opportunities to embrace the feminist ideas, which extended throughout her career in civil society on women's rights and empowerment.

A student of literature and journalism, who speaks Romanian, she began her career as National Albanian Radio's news spokeswoman in Romanian, and then as editor of poetry, drama criticism in the National Publishing House "Naim Frasheri".

In the first years of Albanian democracy, she was a spokeswoman for the Independent Trade Unions of Albania, emphasising and working for women's rights, focusing on social issues and challenges, human rights, social and economic issues of women, mentality and contributed to give voice to expectations and hopes of an entire generation and social identity to women. Under her auspices started during the first years of democracy the international aid for women's movement and marginalized and poor society groups from church-based organizations such as Brot für die Welt Germany (previously EED), HEKS EPER Switzerland and ICCO Netherlands.

Following her vision, she co-founded and directed during the first four years the Association of Young Christian Women Albania (YWCA Albania) and represented it in the International Young Christian Women Network, by raising women's movement in Albania at the international level; co-founded and directed for 23 years the association Useful to Albanian Women; and already is the founder and executive director of the Community Development Network "Today for the Future"

She is director of Albanian National Gender Equality Anthem "Bring the sun" with support of United Nations Agencies in Albania, produced by "Today for the Future" Network, which with the outstanding campaign for gender equality ranked Albania in the list of 20 global finalists for the third annual Avon Communications Awards: Speaking Out About Violence Against Women.

== Publications ==
- Unemployment Situation in Ex-Swamp Area of Durrës, Albania, Publication in Albanian, co-author
- Monitoring and Assessing the public services on waste management in Ex-Swamp Area of Durrës, Albania, Publication in Albanian, co-author
- SEED Best Practices in Albania, Publication in Albanian-English, co-author
