= Ledia Dushi =

Albanian writer and academic

Ledia Dushi (born 1978) is an Albanian writer and academic. She is known for her poetry in the Gheg Albanian dialect, unusual in a country where published writing is almost exclusively in Tosk Albanian.

== Early life and education ==
Ledia Dushi was born in 1978 in Shkodër, a city in northern Albania. She studied Albanian language and literature, obtaining a doctoral degree in ethnology and folklore from the Institute of Cultural Anthropology and Art Studies at the Academy of Albanological Studies.

== Career ==
Dushi previously worked as a journalist, as well as in municipal government in Shkodër, where she focused on cultural issues.

As an academic, she worked as a lecturer at the University of Belgrade in Albanian language and literature, then at the European University of Tirana. Her academic research focuses on folklore and religious rites, particularly burial rites in northern Albania.

In addition to her own poetry and academic writing, Dushi translates others' work from English, Spanish, and Italian, including writing by Gabriele D'Annunzio, Dylan Thomas, and Jorge Luis Borges.

== Writing ==
Dushi is best known for her work as a poet. Notably, she writes primarily in Gheg Albanian, the dialect used in her native Shkodër. This sets her apart from the vast majority of Albanian writers, who use the standard Albanian dialect that is based on the southern Tosk Albanian. Early in her career, she was criticized for publishing in Gheg, accused of wanting to divide the Albanian nation.

Her first book of poetry, Ave Maria bahet lot, was published in 1997. The following year, it was awarded the Albanian Ministry of Culture's prize for best debut book. This was followed by two more collections in 1999 and 2003.

Her 2009 collection of 33 poems Me mujt me fjet me kthimin e shpendve has been described by some critics as her "masterpiece." Most recently, she has published the collections N`nji fije t`thellë gjaku (2019) and Femna s`asht njeri (2020). A collection of her poetry translated into English was published in 2019 under the title Rain in the Dark.

Dushi's poetry is influenced by the work of such modernists as Ezra Pound.

== Selected works ==
- Ave Maria bahet lot (Ave Maria Turns to Tears), 1997
- Seancë dimnash (Session of Winters), 1999
- Askush nuk vdes për mue (No One Dies for Me), 2003
- Me mujt me fjet me kthimin e shpendve (If I Could Sleep With the Bird's Return), 2009
- N`nji fije t`thellë gjaku (In a Deep Thread of Blood), 2019
- Femna s`asht njeri (Woman Is Not Human), 2020
