= Rreze Abdullahu =

Kosovar writer

- Born: April 10, 1990 (age 35); Ferizaj, Kosovo
- Occupation: Writer

Rreze Abdullahu Ferizaj, Kosovo is a Kosovar writer who writes in Albanian. She is best known for Nuk du luftë (I don't want war), a wartime diary she kept as a child during the 1999 Kosovo conflict. The diary is written in her native Gheg dialect.
