= Irma Kurti =

Italo-Albanian poet, writer, lyricist and journalist

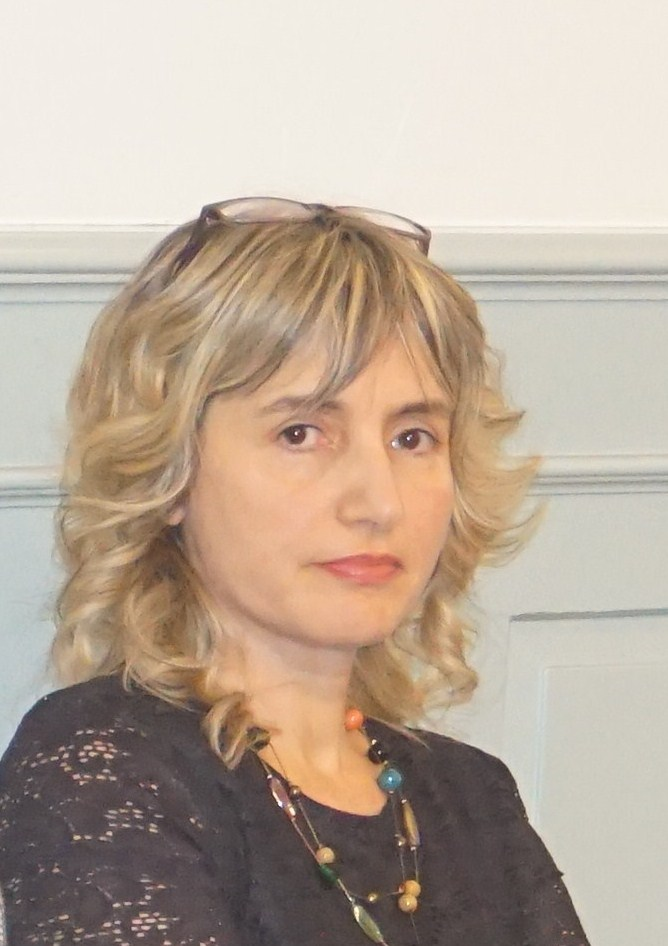
- Irma Kurti in 2019
- Born: March 20, 1966 (age 60); Tirana
- Citizenship: Italian, Albanian
- Education: University of Athens
- Alma mater: University of Tirana
- Occupations: Poet, writer, lyricist, journalist, translator
- Parent(s): Hasan Kurti, Sherife Mezini Kurti
- Writing career
- Genres: Poetry, Novels, Short stories, Lyrics

Irma Kurti (born March 20, 1966, in Tirana) is an Albanian poet, writer, lyricist, journalist and translator. She is a naturalized Italian citizen.

== Life ==
She graduated from the English Department of the University of Tirana in 1988, and has since worked as a teacher of English and journalist for various newspapers, such as "Mësuesi" (The teacher), and "Dita informacion" (The Day Information), among others.

In September 1997, she completed a one-year Greek language and culture course at the University of Athens, Greece. She also took numerous courses for specialization in journalism in various locations across Europe and North America.

Kurti began writing poetry at an early age. In 1980, she won first prize in a national contest as part of "Pionieri" magazine's 35th anniversary. In 1989, she took second prize in a competition organized by Radio-Tirana for young poets on the 45th anniversary of Albania's liberation. Since then, she has won 85 awards in several international literary contests within Italy and Switzerland. In 2013, she won the IX Edition International Prize Universum Donna (equivalent to Woman of the Year) and the Ambassador of Peace nomination from the University of Peace in Lugano, Switzerland. She was also awarded "The Albanian Poet of the year 2015" prize from the Albanian P.E.N. Center.

In the year 2020, she received the title of Honorary President of WikiPoesia.

She received the Leonardo da Vinci and Giacomo Leopardi prizes from the Chimera Arte Contemporanea Cultural Association of Lecce. The same association also honored her with the European Ambassador Award and named her the Best Poet of the Year in 2022.

Irma Kurti is a member of the jury for several literary competitions in Italy. She is also a translator for the Ithaca Foundation in Spain.

Irma Kurti is also well known as the lyrics writer of many famous Albanian songs. She has written approximately 200 lyrics for adults and children

The poems of Irma Kurti have been included in various publications of the International Library of Poetry in Maryland, USA, such as the anthology "Forever Spoken" and "The best poems and poets of 2007," among others. Her poems and short stories have been included in the anthologies: "Il Federiciano", publication of the Publishing House "Aletti Editore" 2010, "Diffusione Autori" 2011, of "GDS Edizioni", "Lingua Madre- Stories of foreign women in Italy, 2012/2013", "The Universal Encyclopedia of Italian Authors 2013" etc.

Irma Kurti has published 120 works, including books of poetry, fiction, and translations. Her books have been translated and published in 24 countries. She lives in Bergamo, Italy.

== Books published in Albanian by Irma Kurti ==
- Këtë natë me ty, poetries, 1999;
- Shihemi në një tjetër botë, poetries, 2002;
- Qirinjtë janë fikur, poetries, 2003;
- Bëj sikur fle, poetries, 2005;
- Puthja e fundit, poetries, 2007;
- Midis dy brigjeve, autobiographical novel, 2010;
- Një vjeshtë pa kthim, short stories, 2013;
- Nën bluzën time, poetries, 2013.
- Copëza shënimesh nëpër rrugët e shkreta, journalism articles, 2013;
- Njeriu që fliste me pemët, novel, 2015;
- Nuk është ky deti, poetries, 2016;
- Lajmet vijnë edhe këtu, short stories, 2016;
- Krahët rreh një flutur, poems for children, 2016;
- Në pragun e një dhimbjeje, poetries, 2016;
- Pa atdhe, poetries, 2017;
- Në borxh me dashurinë, poetries, 2018;
- Mesazhe nga lart, poetries, 2018;
- Kohë për t’u dashur, poetries, 2019;
- Dallgët thërresin emrin tënd, novel, 2020;
- Zëri yt tretet në erë, poetries, 2020;
- Grimca gëzimi, poetries, 2020;
- Kujtimet e një mjeku, coauthor Hasan Kurti, 2021;
- Shelgu lotues, poetries, 2021;
- Humbur mes ngjyrash, poetries, 2022;
- Ti je loti im, poetries, 2022;
- Ditët e fundit të një qyteti, novel, 2022;
- Hijet e qytetit tim, poetries, 2023;
- Diellin shoh pas qelqesh, poetries, 2023;
- 100 poezi, poetries, 2024;
- Bashkëbisedim me poetë dhe shkrimtarë nga bota, interviews, 2024;
- Kthimi, poetries by Irma Kurti and photographs by Iliriana Kurti, 2026.

== Books in Italian ==
- Tra le due rive, novel, 2011;
- Risvegliare un amore spento, poetries, 2011;
- Un autunno senza ritorno, short stories, 2012;
- Sotto la mia maglia, poetries, 2013;
- Le notizie arrivano anche qui, short stories, 2014;
- Non è questo il mare, poetries, 2014;
- Sulla soglia di un dolore, poetries, 2016;
- Senza patria, poetries, 2016;
- In assenza di parole, novel, 2017;
- Le pantofole della solitudine, poetries, 2018;
- Il sole ha emigrato, poetries, 2019;
- In una stanza con i ricordi, poetries, 2019;
- Nella mia anima piove, poetries, 2020;
- I ricordi di un medico, memories, coauthor Hasan Kurti, 2020;
- Messaggi dall'alto, poetries, 2021;
- Briciole di gioia, poetries, 2021;
- Le onde chiamano il tuo nome, novel, 2021;
- Un immenso cielo d’estate, poetries, 2022;
- Persi tra i colori, poetries, 2022;
- Un giorno mi racconterai, poetries, 2022;
- La tua voce nel vento, poetries, 2023;
- Met de ogen van een kind - Con gli occhi del bambino”, bilingual book (Dutch-Italian), Belgium & Netherlands, 2023;
- Sei la mia lacrima, poetries, 2023;
- Vite chiuse a chiave, novel, 2023;
- Un pètalo de flor - Un petalo di fiore, bilingual book (Spanish-Italian), Colombia,2024;
- Οι σκιερεσ πλευρεσ τησ πολησ μου - Le ombre della mia città, bilingual book (Greek-Italian), Greece, 2024;
- Mis estaciones - Le mie stagioni, bilingual book (Spanish-Italian), Argentina, 2024;
- Guardo il sole dietro la finestra, poetries, 2024;
- Tijd om lief te hebben - Tempo di amarci, bilingual book (Dutch-Italian), Belgium & Netherlands, 2025;
- Anima incrinata/Alma fracturada, bilingual book (Italian-Portuguese), Portugal, 2025;
- Alba tinge tutto di luce, poetries & photographs by Biagio Fortini, 2025;
- Cerco di dirti..., poetries & photographs by Biagio Fortini, 2025.

== Books in English ==
- I knew the gray sky, poetries, USA, 2014.
- Under my blouse, poetries, 2015.
- A cottage in the forest, children's poetry, 2016.
- Without a homeland, poetries, USA, 2019.
- Within a sorrow, poetries, Philippines, 2021.
- In every raindrop, poetries, 2021.
- Love, you don't know, poetries, Canada, 2022.
- The last days of a city, novel, Philippines, 2022.
- Vanished loves, poetry collection, India, 2022.
- It’s raining in my soul, bilingual edition, English-Turkish, Turkey 2022.
- Your image between my fingers, bilingual edition, English-Spanish, Chile 2023.
- We met in a tear, bilingual edition English-Urdu (Pakistan), 2023.
- It's raining in my soul, bilingual edition English-Urdu, 2023.
- One day you will tell me, poetries, USA, 2023.
- Lost in the colors, poetries, India, 2023.
- A difficult love, poetries, 2024.
- Walking in the rain, poetries, 2024.
- The ticket of a canceled trip, short stories, 2025.
- If love is this / Si el amor es esto, poetry collection (Guatemala), 2025.
- Lost leaves, Irma Kurti & Michael Lee Johnson, poetry collection, 2026.
- Drops of water and tears, poetry collection, Australia, 2026.
- Another day is coming, poetry collection, USA, 2026.

== Awards ==
- First prize at the International Contest of Poetry and Prose 2011 "Napoli Cultural Classic" in the category of foreign authors.
- First prize in the prose section of the International Contest "Lake Gerundo -Europe and Culture", ninth edition, 2011, at the city of Paullo, Milano.
- The International Prize "Universum Donna" for Literature, IX Edition 2013 and the "Ambassador of Peace" nomination from the University of Peace of Lugano, Switzerland.
- First Prize at the International Literary Contest: "Città di Treviglio" for short stories.
- First Prize at the International Literary Contest: "Europa" 2015, Lugano, Switzerland.
- First Prize at the International Literary Contest: "Posedonia Paestum" 2015, Salerno.
- "The Albanian Poetess of the year 2015" from the Albanian P.E.N Center.
- The best song lyrics at Children Festival "Vihuela 2016", in Pristine, Kosovo.
- First Prize at the International Literary Contest: "Posedonia Paestum" 2017, Salerno.
- First Prize at the International Literary Contest: "The days of Albanian Literature" 2017, Michigan, USA.
- First Prize at the Literary Contest: "Scriptura" 2019, in the category of foreign authors.
- First Prize at the Literary Contest: "Leandro Polverini", 2019.
- First Prize at the Literary Contest: "Universum-Switzerland", 2020, in the category of published books.
- First Prize at the International Literary Contest: "Picàturi de suflet", 2020.
- First Prize at the National Literary Contest: "L'arte in versi", 2021, in the category of foreign authors.
- First Prize at the National Literary Contest: "Le più belle frasi d'amore", 2022.
- Naji Naaman’s Literary Prize, Honor Prize for complete work, 2023.
- First place winner of Poetry Thymes Award Contest, USA.
- First place at the International Literary Contest "Scriptura", Naples, 2024.
- First place at the International Literary Contest "Leandro Polverini", 2024.
- First place in Weekly Poems, Wax Poetry and Art Magazine, British Columbia, Canada, 2025.
- First Prize in the Pan-Hellenic and Pan-Cypriot Literary Contest 2025 organized by the Union of Greek Writers (Athens, Greece).
- “Golden Pen Award” by the Korean Association of World Literature (KAOWL) in collaboration with the Korean newspaper “Culture & People” (CNPN), 2026.
