= Elvira Dones =

Albanian novelist, screenwriter, and documentary film producer

- Born: July 24, 1960 (age 66); Durrës, PR Albania
- Occupation: Writer
- Writing career
- Language: Albanian
- Genres: Fiction, short story, poetry
- Notable works: Sworn Virgin, Yjet Nuk Vishen Keshtu etc.

Elvira Dones (born July 24, 1960) is an Albanian novelist, screenwriter, and documentary film producer.

== Biography ==
Born in the coastal city of Durrës Dones graduated from the State University of Tirana. In 1988 she was employed by Albanian State Television and in this capacity traveled to Switzerland, where she defected. Tried for treason in Albania (in absentia), she was sentenced to prison and denied access to her young son until after the collapse of communism in Albania in 1992. From 1988 until 2004, Dones lived in Switzerland where she worked as a writer and a television journalist, while also writing, directing, and producing several documentaries. Since 2004, she has lived in the United States. The bulk of her writing is in either Italian or Albanian, but several of her documentary films have been subtitled in English. Several of these films have either won or been nominated for various awards. Her most recent documentary, Sworn Virgin, tells the story of women in northern Albania who swear perpetual chastity in their teenage years and become men in their society —not women acting like men or women who have gender reassignment, but simply women who are now men. This film was named the best documentary at the Baltimore Women's Film Festival in 2007.

== Selected bibliography ==
- Dones, Elvira (1998). Kardigan. Tirana: Cabej Publishing House.
- Dones, Elvira (1999). Lule te Gabuara. Tirana: Onufri Publishing House.
- Dones, Elvira (2001). Yjet Nuk Vishen Keshtu. Elbasan: Sejko Publishing House.
- Dones, Elvira (2001). Dite e Bardhe e Fyer. Elbasan: Sejko Publishing House.
- Dones, Elvira (2002). I Love Tom Hanks. Elbasan: Sejko Publishing House.
- Dones, Elvira (2004). Me Pas Heshtja. Elbasan: Sejko Publishing House.
- Dones, Elvira (2007). Vergine giurata. Milano: Feltrinelli.
- Dones, Elvira (2011). Piccola guerra perfetta. Torino: Einaudi.
- Dones, Elvira (2014). Sworn Virgin. London: And Other Stories.
- Dones, Elvira (2023) La breve vita di Lukas Santana, Milano, La nave di Teseo

== Filmography ==
- Brunilda (2003)
- I ngujuar (Nailed) (2004)
- Sworn Virgin (2015)
