= Mimoza Ahmeti =

Albanian woman poet

- Born: Krujë, PR Albania
- Education: Post doc SFU Paris
- Occupations: poet, writer

Mimoza Ahmeti is an Albanian poet, writer and the winner of the first Festival of Poetry in Sanremo in 1988, organized by RAI. She has been described by Robert Elsie as an "enfant terrible." Mimoza is a postdoctoral lecturer in psychotherapy. She graduated with a PhD degree from SFU Vienna with honors and completed her postdoctoral studies at SFU Paris.

Mimoza Ahmeti participated as a contestant in the third season of the Albanian reality show "Ferma VIP", which she won on 15 June 2026.

== Works ==
After two volumes of verse in the late eighties, it was the 53 poems in the collection Delirium which caught the public's attention. Then the poetry collection The Pollination of Flowers. Ahmeti has published widely and her books have been translated into Italian, French and English. Although best known for her poems, she has also written short stories and made three expositions of her paintings. She has also two albums of her songs. Ahmeti ran a program Transculture, in Albanian RTSH-tv from 2019 to 2022. She speaks English and French. List of her published works include:

- Ça va Albanie?
- L'absurde coordinatif
- Milchkuss Novel
- The tutor Novel
- The stories of civilization Stories & drawings
- The book of happiness Poems
- Pjalmimi i luleve: Poezi
- Meaning, Significance: Science
- Womanizing Science
- Contigency Science
- Arkitrau Novel
- Bëhu i bukur: Poezi
