= Helena Kadare =

Albanian writer and translator

- Born: Helena Gushi; 21 September 1943 (age 83); Fier, Albanian Kingdom
- Occupation: Writer
- Spouse: Ismail Kadare
- Children: 2, including Besiana
- Writing career
- Notable work: Një lindje e vështirë
- Notable awards: Autorja e Vitit 2011 (Author of the Year in Albania)
- Movement: Postmodern literature

Helena "Elena" Kadare (née Gushi; born 21 September 1943) is an Albanian screenwriter, translator and author of short stories and novels. One of the latter, 1970's Një lindje e vështirë, is the first novel by a woman to have been published in Albanian. A Woman from Tirana (1990) is the novel of Kadare's that is perhaps her most widely read.

== Biography ==
Helena Gushi was born on 21 September 1943 in Fier, in southern Albania. She studied literature at the University of Tirana, and then worked in journalism and as an editor in the publishing industry. In 1963, she married writer Ismail Kadare, and the couple had two children, Gresa and Besiana. Kadare moved to Paris, France, with her husband 1990, as her husband had been critical of the Albanian government and needed to receive political asylum there. The couple returned to Albania in 2021. Ismail died on 1 July 2024.

Their daughter, Besiana Kadare, is the Albanian Ambassador to the United Nations, a Vice President of the United Nations General Assembly for its 75th session, and Albania's Ambassador to Cuba.

== Works ==
Kadare has written numerous short stories, as well as translations of other works. She has the distinction of being the first woman to have a full length novel published in Albanian: Një lindje e vështirë, issued in Tirana in 1970 (A Difficult Birth). Her novel Një grua nga Tirana, issued in Tirana in 1994. has been translated into French (Une femme de Tirana, 1995), Dutch (Een vrouw uit Tirana, 1996) and German (Eine Frau aus Tirana, 2009), as well as into English (A woman from Tirana).

- Një lindje e vështirë (A Difficult Birth), novel, 1970
- Një grua nga Tirana (A Woman from Tirana), novel, 1990 ISBN 99927-45-13-4
- Bashkëshortët (Spouses), novel, 2002 ISBN 99927-45-77-0
- Le temps qui manque mémoires, 2010
- Kohë e pamjaftueshme (Insufficient Time), novel, 2011 ISBN 978-99956-87-51-9
- Një grua në Berlin: Ditar 20 prill - 22 Qershor 1945 (A Woman in Berlin - Anonymous (Diary April 20 - June 22, 1945), 2016

== See also ==
- Albanian literature
