= Petrelë =

- Administrative unit
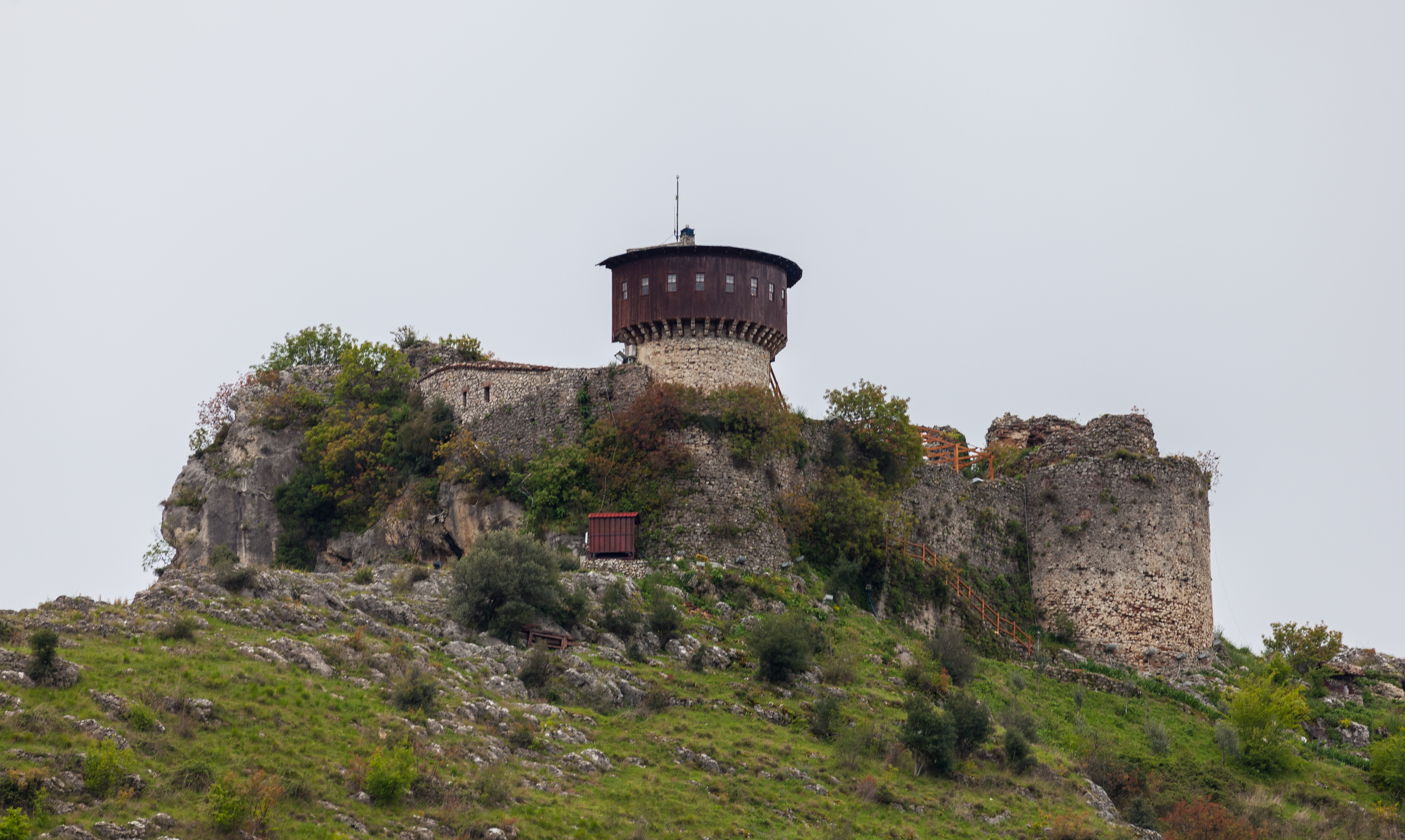
- Petrelë Castle

- Location within Albania
- Coordinates: 41°15′N 19°51′E
- Country: Albania
- County: Tirana
- Municipality: Tirana

Population (2011)
  - Administrative unit: 5,542
- Time zone: UTC+1 (CET)
  - Summer (DST): UTC+2 (CEST)
- Postal Code: 1034
- Area Code: (0)49

Petrelë is a village and a former municipality 15 km south of Tirana, in central Albania. It is part of Tirana County. At the 2015 local government reform it became a subdivision of the municipality Tirana. The population at the 2011 census was 5,542. It is known for its castle and history.

== Castle ==
It has been suggested that Petrela was originally called Petralba. Moikom Zeqo has further suggested that the name Petralba evolved from Albanopolis, a Roman-era city mentioned by Ptolemy. The name Petrelë comes from the fact that the town and its castle are built on a huge stone on top of a small mountain. Halfway up the hill on which Petrela is situated are the remains of defensive walls which comprise terracing operations on the S, E, and W sides; above each section is a level area. On the best preserved, which is on the W side, rises a building to a height of 5 m and to a length of 20 m. The walls form a double ring, of which the outer section is built of square blocks which form a pseudo-isodomic structure strengthened by buttresses. In the vicinity, fragments of Hellenistic pottery have been discovered.

The tower in the center was built in the 5th century AD, although most of the remainder is Byzantine, dating from between the 11th and 14th centuries. The castle was used mostly to watch for Ottoman troops marching towards inner Albania. In Ottoman times, the castle was the house of Scanderbeg's sister (Mamica Kastrioti). The town and castle were also very dear to Scanderbeg, and he used to take time off to come and rest in the area.

The castle has views of the Erzen valley, the hills, olive groves, and surrounding mountains.

== See also ==
- History of Albania

== Gallery ==
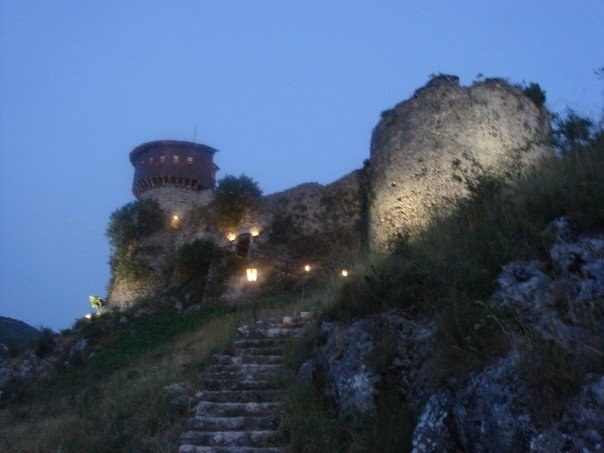
Petrelë Castle, near Tirana, Albania

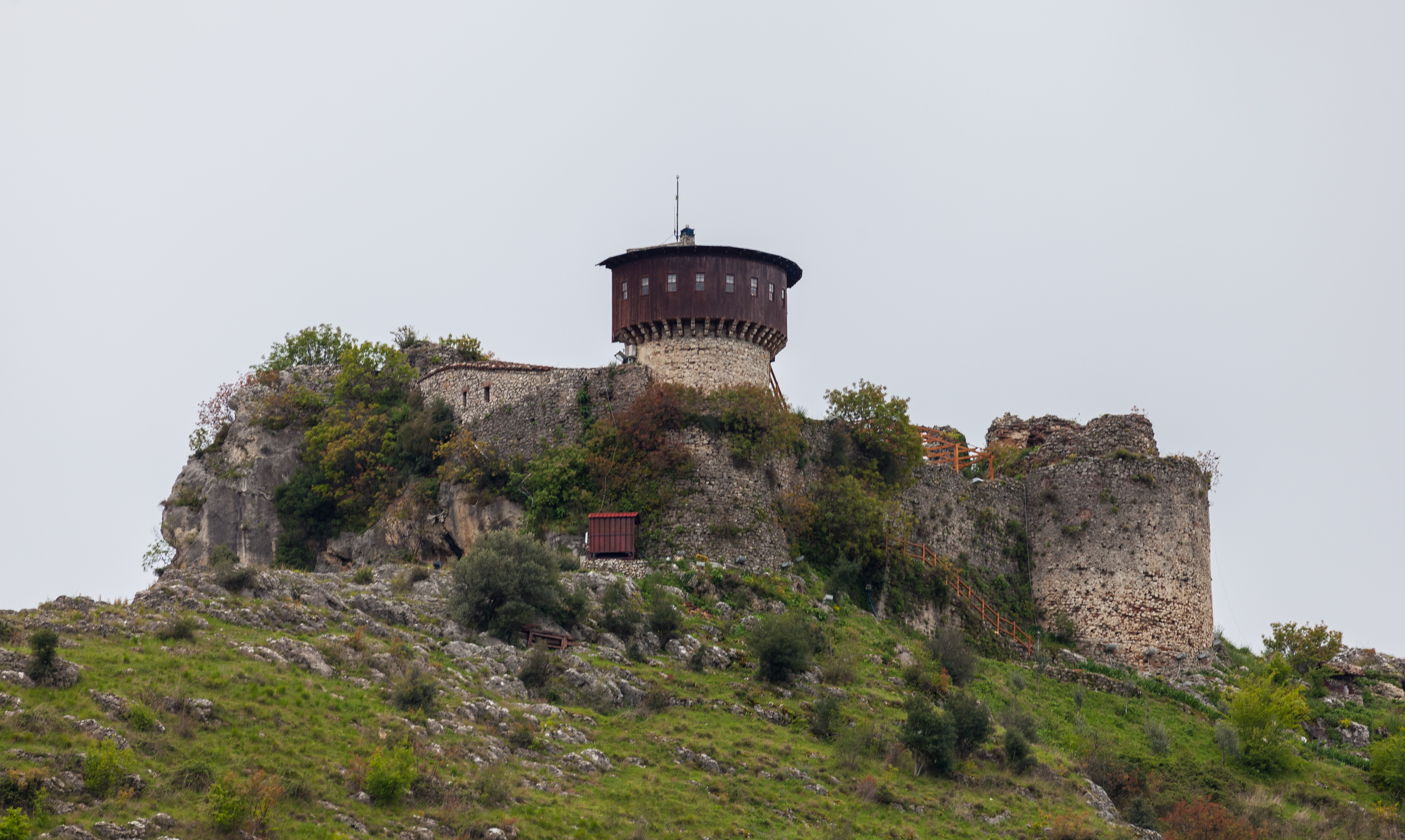
Rock on which Petrela castle was built

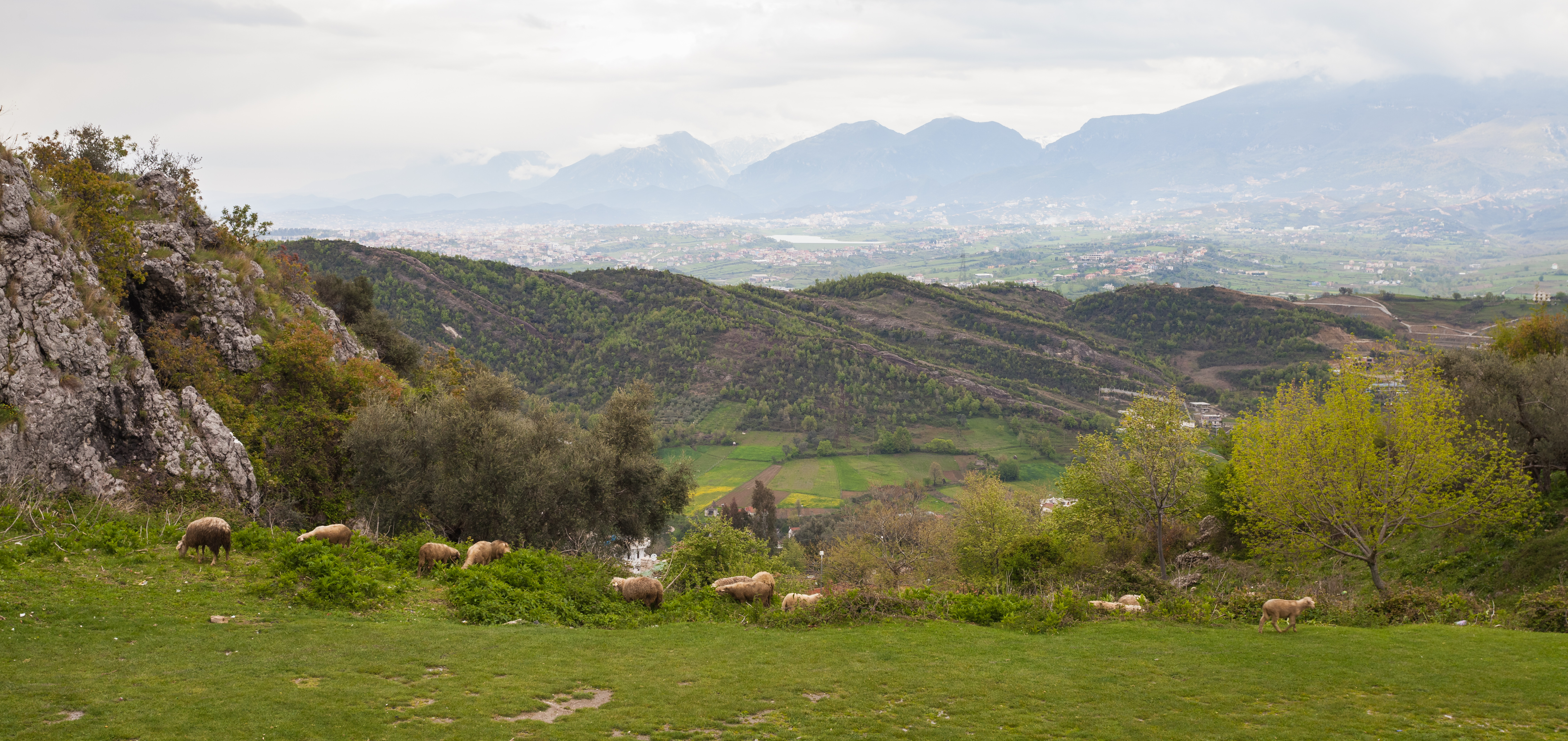
View from Petrela Castle
