= List of Albanian writers =

This is a list of Albanian writers.

== A ==
- Rreze Abdullahu (born 1990)
- Dritëro Agolli (1931–2017)
- Mimoza Ahmeti (born 1963)
- Ylljet Aliçka (born 1951)
- Gëzim Alpion (born 1962)
- Valdete Antoni (born 1953)
- Fatos Arapi (1930–2018)
- Lindita Arapi (born 1972)
- Pjetër Arbnori (1935–2006)
- Asdreni (1872–1947)

== B ==
- Frang Bardhi (1606–1643)
- Marin Barleti (15th century)
- Eqrem Basha (born 1948)
- Mario Bellizzi (born 1957)
- Nafiz Bezhani (1928–2004)
- Ben Blushi (born 1969)
- Pjetër Bogdani (1630–1689)
- Flora Brovina (born 1949)
- Maria Antonia Braile (20th century)
- Dionis Bubani (1926–2006)
- Gjergj Bubani (1899–1954)
- Klara Buda (21st century)
- Pjetër Budi (1566–1622)
- Uran Butka (born 1938)
- Gjon Buzuku (16th century)

== C ==
- Martin Camaj (1925–1992)
- Nicola Chetta (1741–1803)
- Selfixhe Ciu (1918–2003)
- Constantine of Berat (18th century)

== Ç ==
- Nelson Çabej (born 1939)
- Aleks Çaçi (1916–1989)
- Andon Zako Çajupi (1866–1930)
- Thoma Çami (19th century)
- Spiro Çomora (1918–1973)
- Diana Çuli (born 1951)
- Tonin Çobani (born 1947)

== D ==
- Gavril Dara the Younger (1826–1885)
- Adem Demaçi (1936–2018)
- Musa Demi (1878–1971)
- Jeronim De Rada (1814–1903)
- Ridvan Dibra (born 1959)
- Dora d'Istria (1828–1888)
- Spiro Dine (1846–1922)
- Elvira Dones (born 1960)
- Yahya Dukagjini (1498–1582)

== E ==
- Pal Engjëlli (1416–1470)
- Rudi Erëbara (born 1971)

== F ==
- Nikollë Filja (1691–1769)
- Gjergj Fishta (1871–1940)
- Nezim Frakulla (1680–1760)
- Dalip Frashëri (19th century)
- Naim Frashëri (1846–1900)
- Sami Frashëri (1850–1904)
- Shahin Frashëri (19th century)
- Llazar Fundo (1899–1944)

== G ==
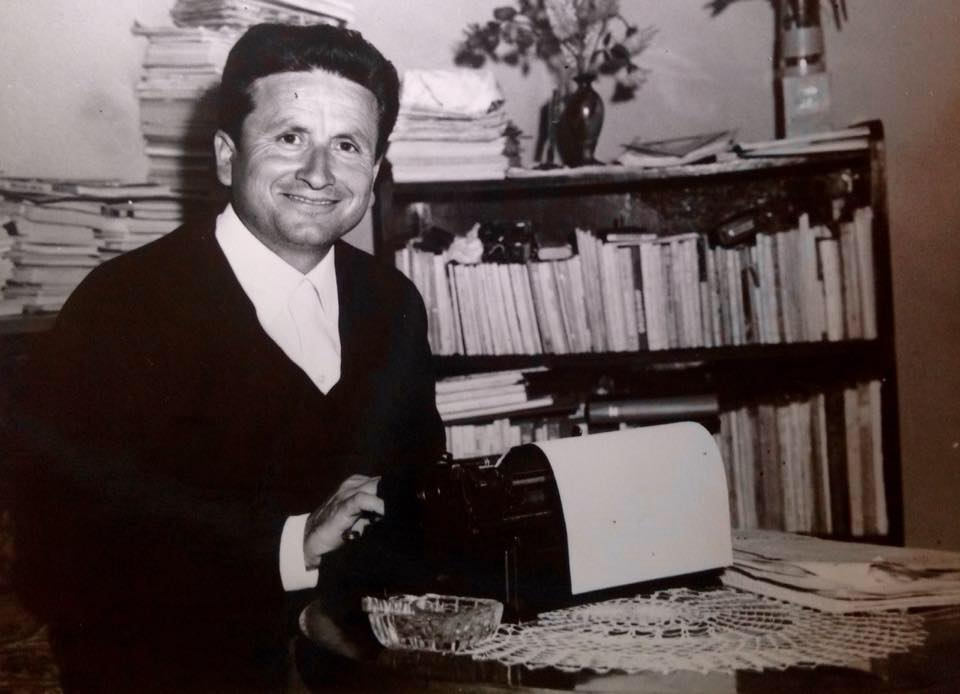
Odhise Grillo

- Mirko Gashi (1939–1995)
- Sabri Godo (1929–2011)
- Gregory of Durrës (18th century)
- Odhise Grillo (1932–2003)
- Luigj Gurakuqi (1879–1925)

== Gj ==
- Fatmir Gjata (1922–1989)
- Kadri Gjata (1865–1912)
- Julia Gjika (born 1949)

== H ==
- Sinan Hasani (1922–2010)
- Ervin Hatibi (born 1974)
- Rifat Hoxha (born 1946)
- Shefki Hysa (born 1957)

== I ==
- Anilda Ibrahimi (born 1972)
- Vera Isaku (1955-2021)
- Nikolla Ivanaj (1879–1951)

== J ==
- Halil Jaçellari (1940–2009)
- Petro Janura (1911–1983)
- Irhan Jubica (born 1973)

== K ==
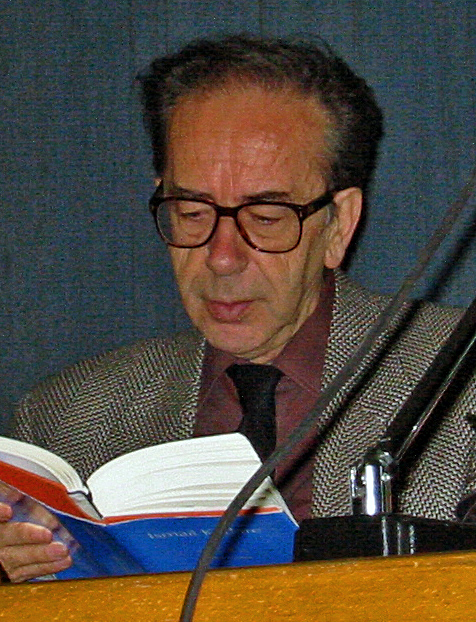
Ismail Kadare

- Helena Kadare (born 1943)
- Ismail Kadare (1936—2024)
- Hasan Zyko Kamberi (18th century)
- Veli Karahoda (born 1968)
- Amik Kasoruho (1932–2014)
- Teodor Keko (1958–2002)
- Jeton Kelmendi (born 1978)
- Skifter Këlliçi (born 1938)
- Ardian Klosi (1957–2012)
- Jolanda Kodra (1910–1963)
- Musine Kokalari (1917–1983)
- Vedat Kokona (1913–1998)
- Dashnor Kokonozi (born 1951)
- Aristidh Kola (1944–2000)
- Ernest Koliqi (1903–1975)
- Anastas Kondo (1937–2006)
- Fatos Kongoli (born 1944)
- Faik Konica (1875–1942)
- Vath Koreshi (1936–2006)
- Eulogios Kourilas Lauriotis (1880–1961)
- Irma Kurti (born 1966)
- Mitrush Kuteli (1907–1967)

== L ==
- Teodor Laço (1936–2016)
- Natasha Lako (born 1948)
- Skënder Luarasi (1900–1982)
- Fatos Lubonja (born 1951)

== Ll ==
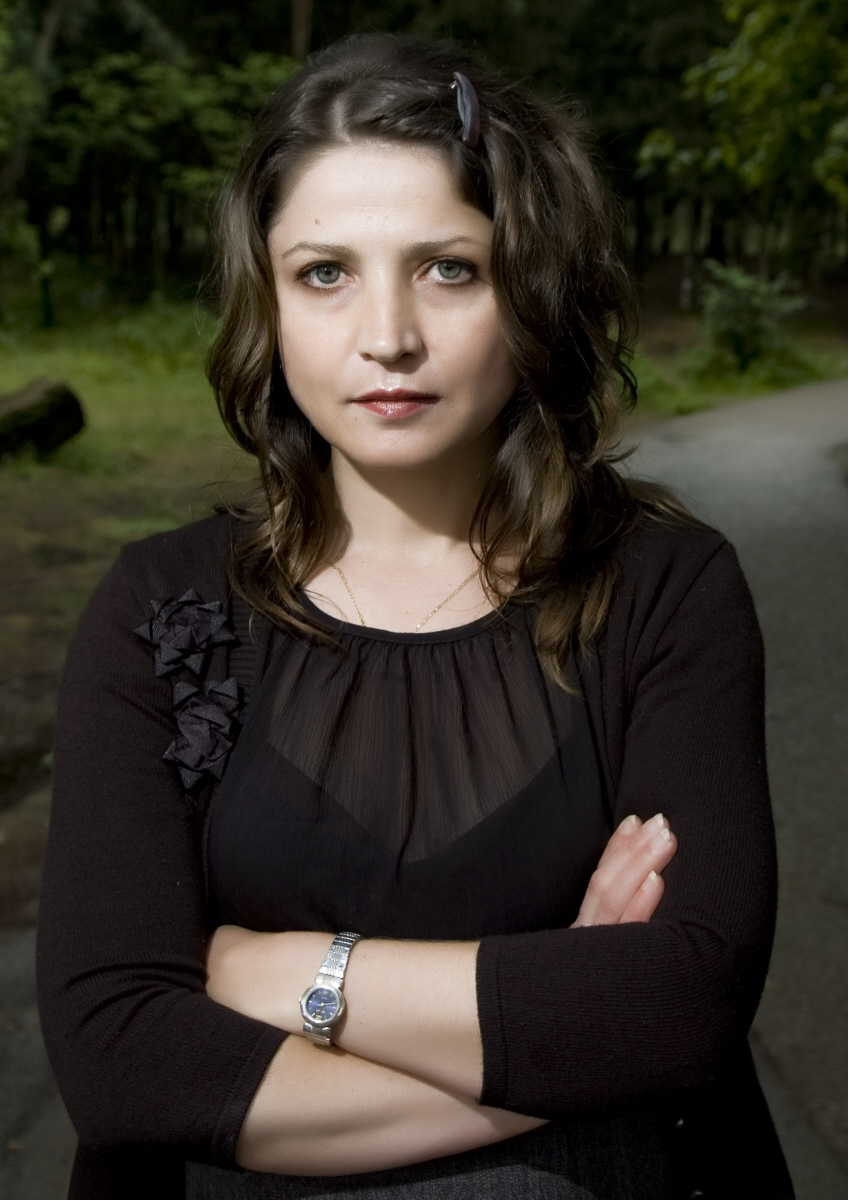
Luljeta Lleshanaku

- Luljeta Lleshanaku (born 1968)

== M ==
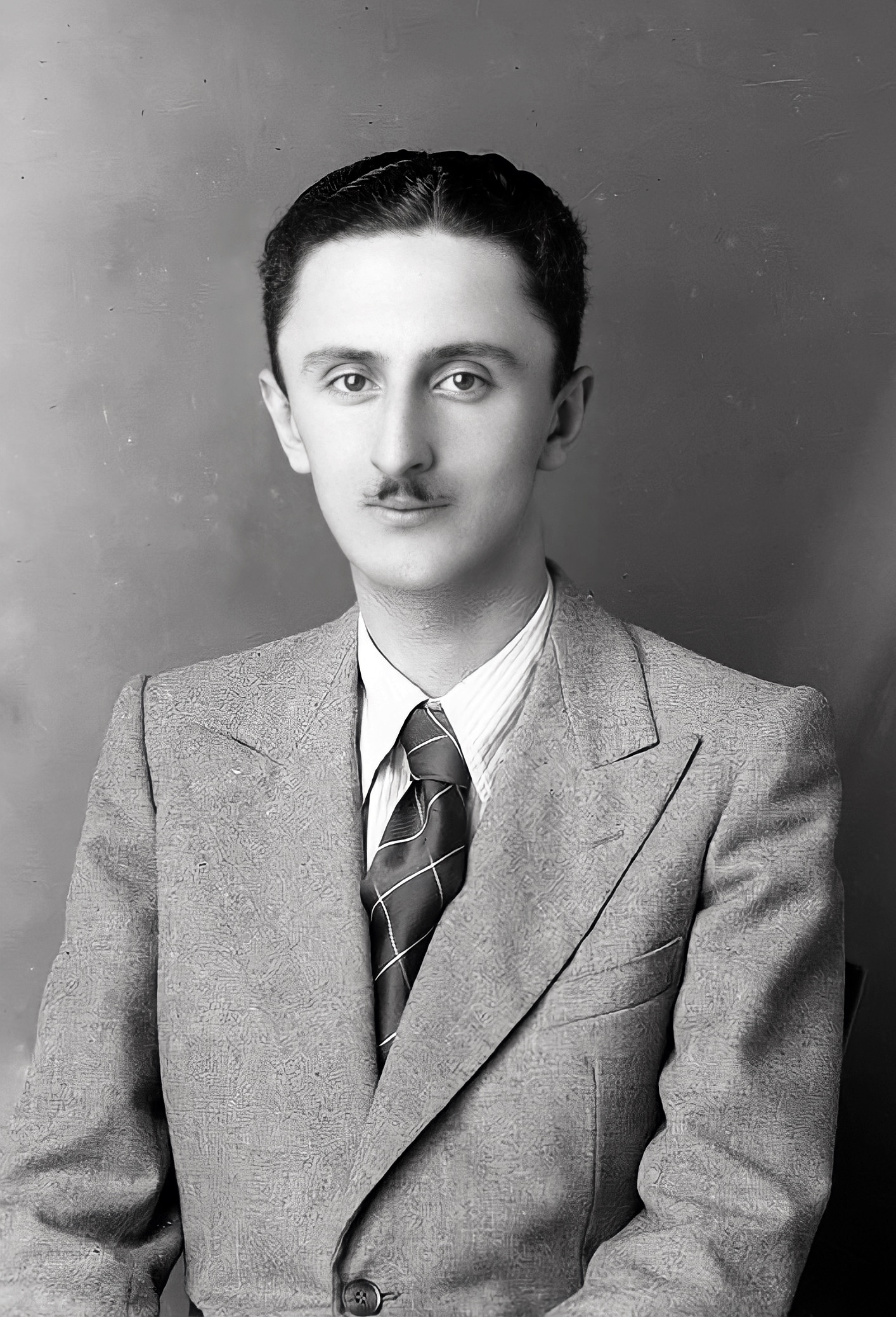
Migjeni

- Sejfulla Malëshova (1900–1971)
- Gjekë Marinaj (born 1965)
- Petro Marko (1913–1991)
- Petrus Massarechius (16th century)
- Lekë Matrënga (1567–1619)
- Din Mehmeti (1932–2010)
- Vangjel Meksi (1770–1821)
- Esad Mekuli (1916–1993)
- Branko Merxhani (1894–1981)
- Mesihi (15th century)
- Migjeni (1911–1938)
- Ndre Mjeda (1866–1937)
- Betim Muço (1947–2015)
- Besnik Mustafaj (born 1958)
- Gjon Muzaka (16th century)
- Faruk Myrtaj (born 1955)

== N ==
- Sulejman Naibi (18th century)
- Kristo Negovani (1875–1905)
- Ndoc Nikaj (1864–1951)
- Fan Noli (1882–1965)
- Majlinda Nana Rama (born 1980)

== P ==
- Fadil Paçrami (1922–2008)
- Ludmilla Pajo (1947–1995)
- Vaso Pasha (1825–1892)
- Arshi Pipa (1920–1997)
- Aurel Plasari (born 1956)
- Ali Podrimja (1942–2012)
- Lasgush Poradeci (1898–1987)
- Foqion Postoli (1889–1927)
- Iljaz Prokshi (1949–2007)

== Q ==
- Leon Qafzezi (born 1953)
- Gjergj Qiriazi (1868–1912)
- Rexhep Qosja (1936–2026)

== R ==
- Kadrush Radogoshi (born 1948)
- Luan Rama (born 1952)
- Musa Ramadani (1944-2020)
- Nijazi Ramadani (born 1964)

== S ==
- Francesco Antonio Santori (1819–1894)
- Zef Serembe (1844–1901)
- Nokë Sinishtaj (1944–2021)
- Brikena Smajli (born 1970)
- Xhevahir Spahiu (born 1945)
- Sterjo Spasse (1914–1989)
- Luan Starova (1941–2022)
- Haki Stërmilli (1895–1953)
- Iliriana Sulkuqi (born 1951)

== Sh ==
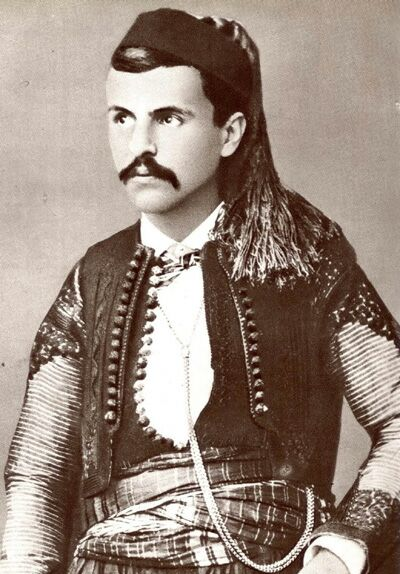
Filip Shiroka

- Halit Shamata (born 1953)
- Sokol Shameti (born 1978)
- Bashkim Shehu (born 1955)
- Filip Shiroka (1859–1935)
- Stefan Shundi (1906–1947)
- Dhimitër Shuteriqi (1915–2003)

== T ==
- Skënder Temali (1946–2021)
- Ismet Toto (1908–1937)
- Kasëm Trebeshina (1926–2017)

== U ==
- Vorea Ujko (1918–1989)
- Hajro Ulqinaku (born 1938)

== V ==
- Giulio Variboba (1725–1788)
- Ardian Vehbiu (born 1959)
- Naum Veqilharxhi (1797–1846)
- Eqrem Vlora (1885–1964)
- Ornela Vorpsi (born 1968)

== W ==
- Anila Wilms (born 1971)

== X ==
- Jakov Xoxa (1923–1979)

== Xh ==
- Bilal Xhaferri (1935–1986)
- Dhimitër Xhuvani (1934–2009)

== Z ==
- Muçi Zade (18th century)
- Injac Zamputi (1910–1998)
- Tajar Zavalani (1903–1966)
- Petraq Zoto (1937–2015)

== Zh ==
- Gjergj Zheji (1926–2010)
- Petro Zheji (1929–2015)

== See also ==
- List of Albanian-language poets
- List of Albanian women writers
