= List of Albanian-language poets =

This is a list of poets who have written in the Albanian language.

== 17th century ==
- Llukë Bogdani (–1687)
- Nezim Frakulla (1680–1760)
- Muçi Zade (18th Century)

== 18th century ==
- Zenel Bastari (18th Century)
- Constantine of Berat (1745–1825)
- Haxhi Ymer Kashari (18th Century)
- Hasan Zyko Kamberi (18th Century)
- Etëhem Bey Mollaj (1783–1846)
- Nasibi Tahir Babai (–1835)
- Sulejman Naibi (–1771)
- Tahir Efendi Jakova (1770–1835)
- Giulio Variboba (1725–1788)
- Demir Vlonjati (1780–1845)

== 19th century ==
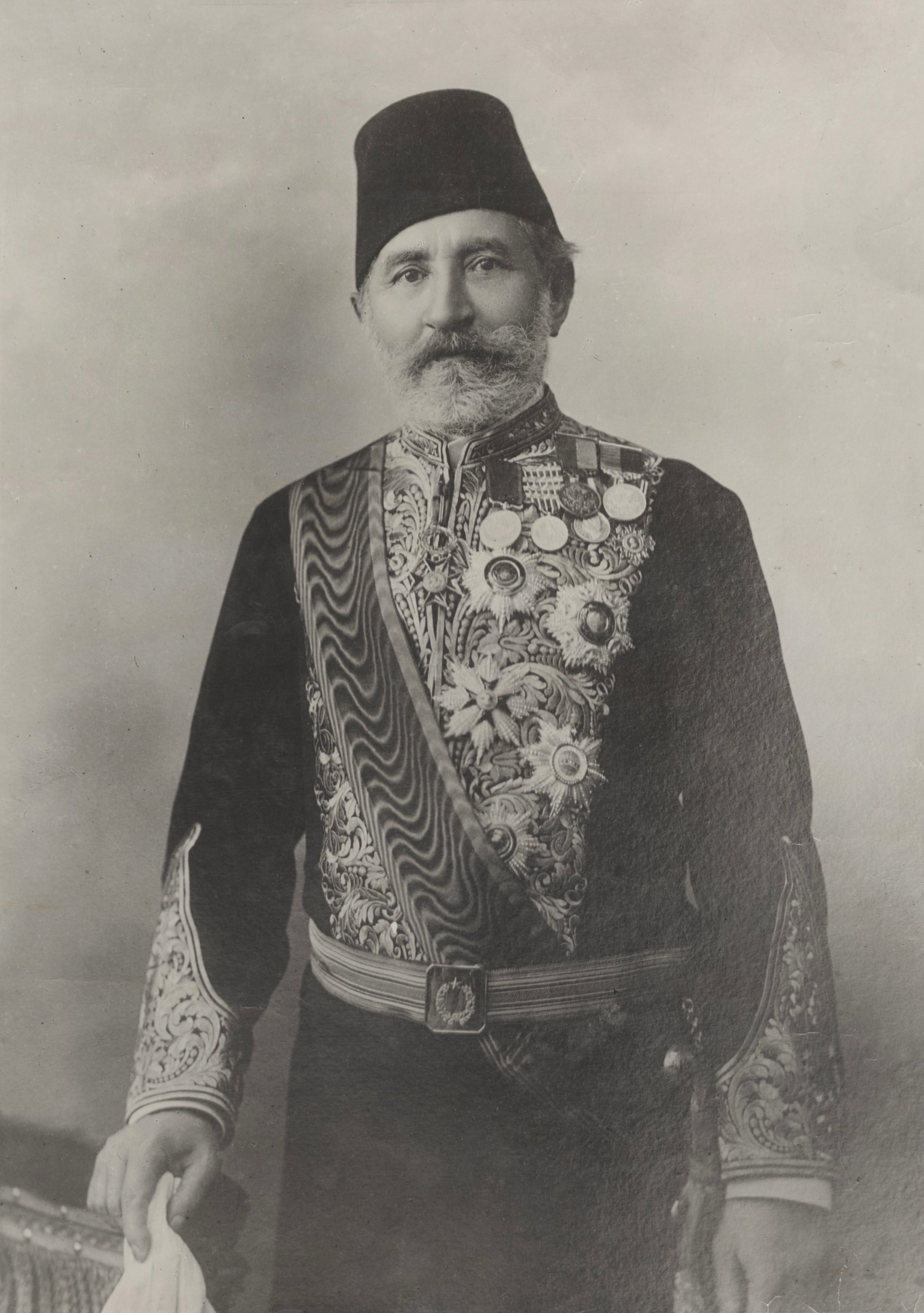
Vaso Pasha

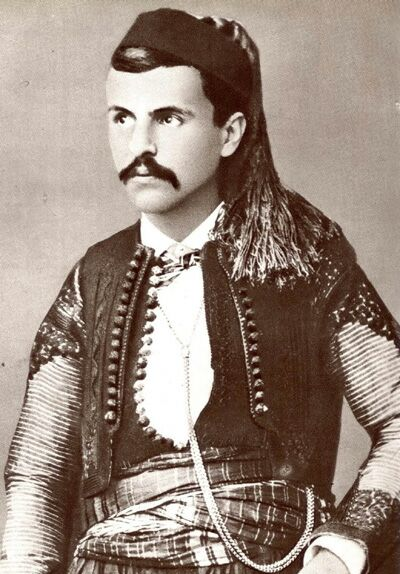
Filip Shiroka

- Asdreni (1872–1947)
- Thoma Avrami (1869–1943)
- Josif Bageri (1870–1916)
- Çajupi (1866–1930)
- Qamil Çami (1875–1933)
- Spiro Dine (1846–1922)
- Abedin Dino (1843–1906)
- Prend Doçi (1846–1917)
- Gjergj Fishta (1871–1940)
- Dalip Frashëri (19th Century)
- Mid’hat Frashëri (1880–1949)
- Naim Frashëri (1846–1900)
- Shahin Frashëri (19th Century)
- Loni Logori (1871–1929)
- Ndre Mjeda (1866–1937)
- Fan Noli (1882–1965)
- Bernardin Palaj (1894–1947)
- Vaso Pasha (1825–1892)
- Girolamo de Rada (1814–1903)
- Francesco Antonio Santori (1819–1894)
- Giuseppe Schirò (1865–1927)
- Filip Shiroka (1859–1935)
- Kristo Sulidhi (1858–1938)
- Murad Toptani (1867–1918)

== 20th century ==
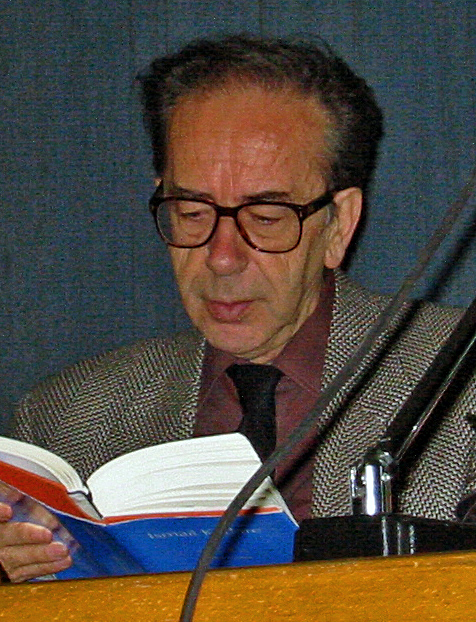
Ismail Kadare

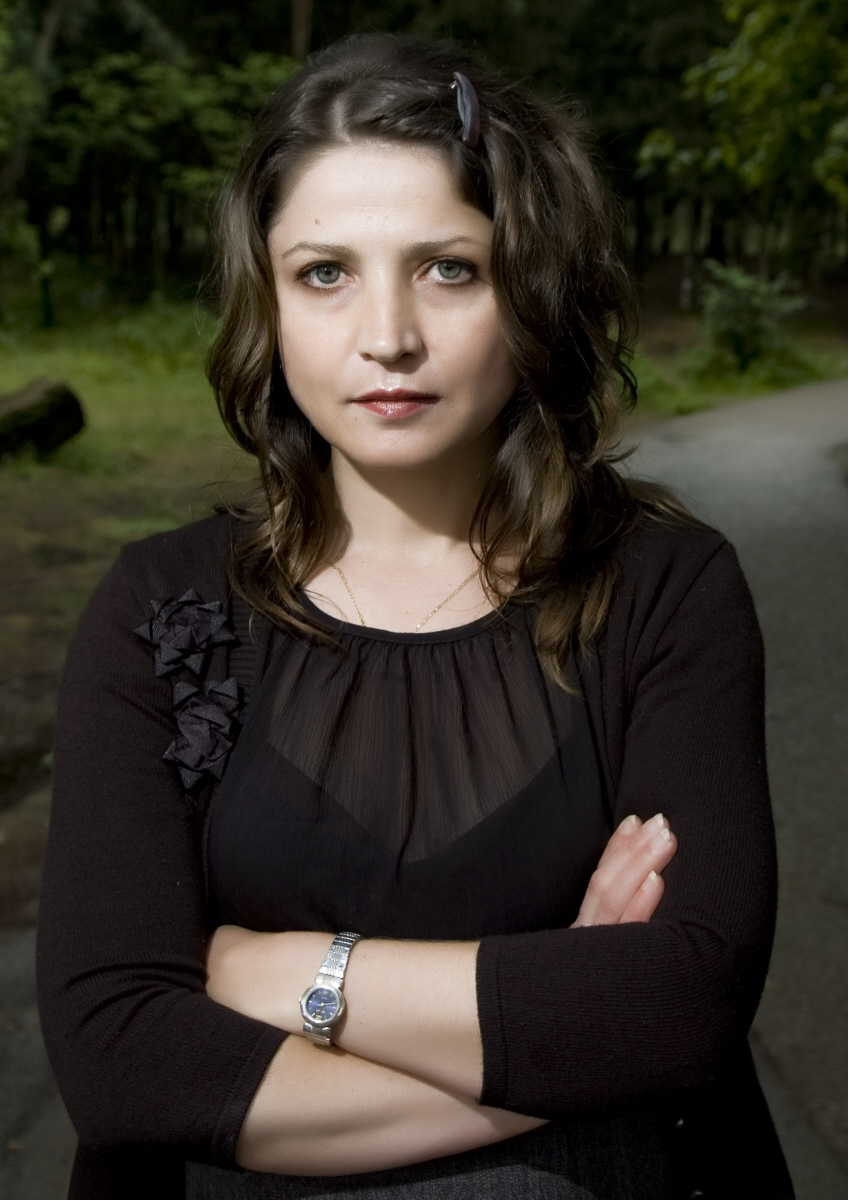
Luljeta Lleshanaku

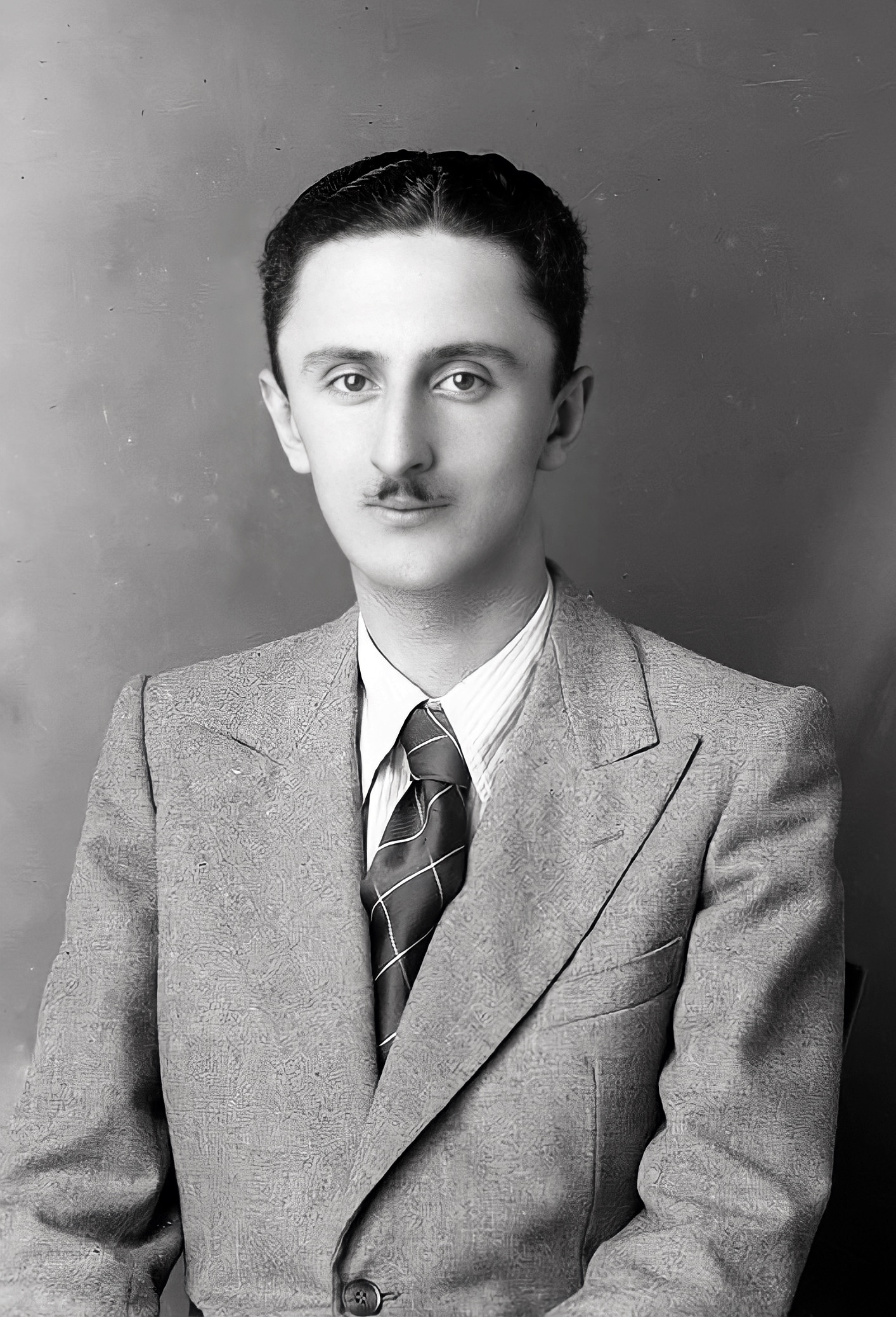
Migjeni

- Flutura Açka (born 1956)
- Dritëro Agolli (1931–2017)
- Mimoza Ahmeti (born 1963)
- Sadri Ahmeti (1939–2010)
- Valdete Antoni (born 1953)
- Fatos Arapi (1930–2018)
- Lindita Arapi (born 1972)
- Besim Bokshi (1930–2014)
- Flora Brovina (born 1949)
- Ibrahim Dalliu (1878–1952)
- Mirko Gashi (1939–1995)
- Ndoc Gjetja (1944–2010)
- Julia Gjika (born 1949)
- Milto S. Gurra (1884–1972)
- Anton Harapi (1888–1946)
- Ervin Hatibi (born 1974)
- Irhan Jubica (born 1973)
- Ismail Kadare (1936–2024)
- Karmel Kandreva (1931–1982)
- Veli Karahoda (born 1968)
- Teodor Keko (1958–2002)
- Ernest Koliqi (1903–1975)
- Mark Krasniqi (1920–2015)
- Irma Kurti (born 1966)
- Natasha Lako (born 1948)
- Luljeta Lleshanaku (born 1968)
- Sejfulla Malëshova (1900–1971)
- Migjeni (1911–1938)
- Betim Muço (1947–2015)
- Faruk Myrtaj (born 1955)
- Havzi Nela (1934–1988)
- Dhimitër Pasko (1907–1967)
- Arshi Pipa (1920–1997)
- Lasgush Poradeci (1899–1987)
- Vinçens Prennushi (1885–1949)
- Leon Qafzezi (born 1953)
- Kadrush Radogoshi (born 1948)
- Nijazi Ramadani (born 1964)
- Giuseppe Schirò Di Maggio (born 1944)
- Dhimitër Shuteriqi (1915–2003)
- Drago Siliqi (1930–1963)
- Llazar Siliqi (1924–2001)
- Risto Siliqi (1882–1936)
- Nokë Sinishtaj (1944–2021)
- Xhevahir Spahiu (born 1945)
- Iliriana Sulkuqi (born 1951)
- Edi Shukriu (1950–2023)
- Skënder Temali (1946–2021)
- Bilal Xhaferri (1935–1986)
- Mihal Zallari (1894–1976)
- Adem Zaplluzha (1943–2020)

== 21st century ==
- Ndriçim Ademaj (born 1991)
- Majlinda Nana Rama (born 1980)
- Mark Lucgjonaj (born 1986)

== See also ==
- List of Albanian writers
