= Adem =

- Pronunciation: /ˈædɛm/ [ɑ:ˈdem]
- Gender: Male
- Language: Arabic, Turkish

Origin
- Meaning: Arabic: "made from"

Other names
- See also: Adam, Ademar, Khadem

Adem (Ottoman Turkish: آدم, Ādem) corresponding to Adam (see also Adam in Islam), is a masculine given name common in Turkey, Bosnia and Albania.

== Given name ==
- Adem Alkaşi (born 1984), Turkish footballer
- Adem Arous (born 2004), Tunisian footballer
- Adem Asil (born 1999), Turkish gymnast
- Adem Bereket (born 1973), Turkish wrestler
- Adem Bona (born 2003), Nigerian-Turkish basketball player
- Adem Boudjemline (born 1994), Algerian Greco-Roman wrestler
- Adem Büyük (born 1987), Turkish footballer
- Adem Čejvan (1927–1989), Bosnian actor
- Adem Demaçi (1936–2018), Kosovar Albanian writer and politician
- Adem Doğan (born 2001), Turkish footballer
- Adem Dursun (born 1979), Turkish footballer
- Adem Grabovci (born 1960), Kosovan politician
- Adem Güven (born 1985), Norwegian footballer
- Adem Hecini (born 1975), Algerian athlete
- Adem Hodža (born 1968), Kosovan politician
- Adem Huskić (born 1955), Bosnian
- Adem İbrahimoğlu (born 1957), Turkish footballer
- Adem Ilhan (born 1977), English composer, producer and singer-songwriter
- Adem Jashari (1955–1998), Kosovar Albanian soldier
- Adem Kapič (born 1975), Slovenian footballer
- Adem Karapici (1912–1972), Albanian footballer and coach
- Adem K (born 1975), Australian musician
- Adem Kılıççı (born 1986), Turkish boxer
- Adem Kurt, Turkish musician
- Adem Koçak (born 1983), Turkish footballer
- Adem Ljajić (born 1991), Serbian footballer
- Adem Mekić (born 1995), Macedonian basketball player
- Adem Agha Mešić (1868–1945), Bosnian politician and military officer
- Adem Mikullovci (1937–2020), Albanian actor and politician
- Adem Ören (born 1979), Turkish basketball player
- Adem Poric (born 1973), Australian footballer
- Adem Redjehimi (born 1995), Algerian footballer
- Adem Sarı (born 1985), Turkish footballer
- Adem Somyurek (born 1968), Australian politician
- Adem Uzun (born 2001), Turkish wrestler
- Adem Yıldırım (born 1973), Turkish politician
- Adem Yze (born 1977), Australian Rules footballer
- Adem Zaplluzha (1943–2020), Kosovar Albanian poet
- Adem Zorgane (born 2000), Algerian footballer

== Surname ==
- Alberto Bustani Adem (born 1954), Mexican engineer
- Alejandro Adem, Mexican mathematician
- Ali Adem (born 2000), Macedonian footballer
- José Adem (1921–1991), Mexican mathematician
- Khalid Adem (born 1975), American convict
- Sonay Adem (1957–2018), Turkish Cypriot politician
- Yashar Adem (1940–2014), Turkish actor

== See also ==
- Adam (given name)
