= Ndriçim =

Ndriçim is a masculine Albanian given name. Notable people with the name include:

- Ndriçim Ademaj, Albanian-speaking poet and writer
- Ndriçim Babasi, Albanian politician
- Ndriçim Shtubina (born 1987), Albanian footballer
- Ndriçim Xhepa (born 1957), Albanian actor
