= Jolanda Kodra =

Albanian writer and translator

- Born: Iolanda Guazzoni; 18 March 1910; Rome, Italy
- Died: 16 August 1963 (aged 53)

Jolanda Kodra (1910–1963) was an Italian-Albanian writer and translator, one of the first women writers in the Albanian language, as well as a translator into the Italian language of the works of Albanian writers, such as Ndre Mjeda, Migjeni, Petro Marko, and Sterjo Spasse.

== Life ==
Jolanda Kodra was born an Italian, Iolanda Guazzoni, in 1910, in Rome, Italy, and was a niece of Enrico Guazzoni, an Italian screenwriter and film director. She was pursuing studies in a classical lyceum, when she met with Malo Kodra, originally from Gjirokastër, who was a student in Rome. A fitness teacher, he brought her to Albania in 1931. She soon learned Albanian and started not only to communicate well, but also to publish poetry in Albanian as well as literary criticism articles in well known magazines Hylli i Dritës, Përpjekja shqiptare, Fryma, Njeriu and Tomori on Naim Frashëri, Gjergj Fishta, Migjeni, and Ndre Mjeda. Kodra worked particularly on Migjeni and Mjeda, which she later translated into Italian. She was one of the first women to publish in Albania, in the company of Selfixhe Ciu and Musine Kokalari.

After World War II she worked as a translator from and into Italian, as well as Russian, of, among other, writers such as Petro Marko and Sterjo Spasse. She was allowed to neither teach by the communist regime nor to go back to her home country until 1962, one year before her death.

== Work as a translator ==
Kodra translated into Italian almost the complete work of Migjeni; she worked on his poetry in the version of 1957, published by Skënder Luarasi, and finished them in 1962, entitled Poesie e prose. The only song missing is the Kanga e fundit. Also she omitted Migjeni's notes, as well as certain subtitles of some poetries such as that of Dityramb Nietzsche-an, Melodisë kombëtare (To the national melody) and the dedications. Her translations of the 1960s are very precious, because nowadays hard to find. Kodra remained very true to the original text as a translator, which was a must in those years for a translator. For this reason, there is an emotional shift in Kodra's translations.
