= Huskić =

Huskić is a surname. Notable people with the surname include:

- Adem Huskić (born 1955), Bosnian politician
- Goran Huskić (born 1992), Serbian basketball player
