= Luljeta =

Luljeta is an Albanian feminine given name, which means "flower of life". The name may refer to:

- Luljeta Bitri (born 1976), Albanian actress, director and producer
- Luljeta Lleshanaku (born 1968), Albanian poet
