= Vera Isaku =

Albanian poet (1955–2021)

- Born: March 1955 (age 70–71); Bilisht, Albania
- Education: University of Tirana
- Occupations: Journalist, writer, director
- Spouse: Agim Isaku

Vera Isaku (12 March 1955 – 22 July 2021) was an Albanian journalist, writer and director of institutions.

== Life ==
Isaku graduated at 1979 in University of Tirana, Faculty of Albanian Linguistics and Literature, one of the first women journalists of the first opposition newspaper in the end of Stalinism in Albania, the Rilindja Demokratike. Vera Isaku held the position of deputy director of Albanian Radio and Television and the other position as a director of the International Center of Culture at the Pyramid of Tirana. Isaku was the wife of the writer, diplomat and publicist Agim Isaku, ambassador of the Republic of Albania in Bratislava, Slovakia. Isaku lost her life as a result of an incurable disease, from which she suffered for a long time.

== Books ==
- 2000 – "Bald Fates" – "Fate Tullace" ISBN 9789992783238, OCLC 248921013
- 2002 – "Fate hang in Biarritz" – "Në Biarritz rri fati" ISBN 9789992783283, OCLC 734097799
- 2004 – "Good intentions" – "Qëllime të mira" OCLC 61406366
- 2007. – Shqipëtarët nuk e njohin grinë : publicistike Tiranë : Botimet "Isaku", ISBN 9789994399604, OCLC 591651421
- 2008 – "Russian Ladies in Albania" – "Ruset ne Shqipëri"

== See also ==
- List of Albanians (section writers)
- List of Albanians (section journalists)
- List of Albanian writers
