= Sadri Ahmeti =

Albanian painter and poet (1939–2010)

- Born: 3 March 1939
- Died: 24 June 2010 (aged 71); Tirana
- Known for: painter, watercolor
- Awards: Onufri award

Sadri Ahmeti (3 March 1939 – 24 June 2010) was an Albanian painter and poet from Vusanje, Plavë, Gusinje of Montenegro.

== Career ==
He was born in the village of Vusanje. In 1957 he emigrated to Albania. He worked as an agronomist in Berat and Krujë.

He created portraits of women titled Muses or Albanian virgins, as well as landscapes of his fantasies and memories from the past using watercolor techniques.

== Death ==
Ahmeti died, age 71, in Tirana.

== Painting exhibitions ==
Ahmeti participated in several international collective exhibitions and opened personal ones in Belgium, Germany, Kosovo, Slovenia, Sweden, Turkey, Switzerland and the United States.

In Albania, he had sixteen solo exhibitions and participated in three collective exhibitions.

== Awards ==
In 1994, the National Art Gallery of Albania in Tirana presented Ahmeti the Onufri award.

== Poetic publishings ==
- 1991 – "The sun to Balkan does not shine through Goliotok"
- 1993 – "A laugh storms in the darkness"
- 1993 – "The iceberg of the Catastrophe's Prelude"
- 1996 – "The massacre of Tivar"
- 1999 – "33 years in Crucifix"
- 2000 – "The dance of Insanity"
- 2000 – "The wind plays with the leaves of my Fall"
- 2000 – "Will we meet tomorrow?"
- 2001 – "Ridding around the world on a cloud"
- 2001 – "While bathing in the silver of the Moon"

== See also ==
- Modern Albanian art
- List of Albanian painters
- List of Albanian poets
- Literature of Albania
