= Petro Janura =

Albanian literary critic and judge

Petro Janura (1911–1983) was a main personality of the Albanian language, literature, and folklore in Yugoslavia during the mid-1950s to the 1980s. A writer, journalist, folklorist, pedagogue, literary critic, and researcher, he is remembered as the founder of the Albanian language Catedra of the University of Skopje, and editor-in-chief of Skopje-based periodicals as Flaka e vëllazërimit (Flame of brotherhood), and Jehona (The echo).

== Life ==
Janura was born on 25 March 1911 in Fier, then still part of the Ottoman Empire. He emigrated to Romania at an early age and finished high school there. Janura studied law in Italy and graduated in jurisprudence from the University of Pisa. In 1941 he returned to Albania (at that time the Albanian Kingdom under Italy) where he started working as a judge in Gostivar, which had been recently incorporated in the Albanian state. Janura remained in Yugoslavia after World War II. From that moment he was engaged in the development of the Albanian literature and language, literary criticism, and the overall status of the Albanian language within Yugoslavia, and specifically the Republic of Macedonia. He was also a folklorist, having collected and published rare Albanian folklore. As the head of the Albanian Catedra of the University of Skopje, he participated in the Orthography Congress of 1972 and was one of the signatories of the newly established orthographic rules. Janura died on 30 August 1983.

== Work ==
Janura is the author of around 300 articles of three categories: informative-publicity, research studies, and monographs. The first category comprises articles about various literature figures, as Fan Noli, Zef Serembe, Ali Asllani, Mark Gurakuqi, etc. Some of the research articles focus about Voskopojë old scripts and writings, work of Naim Frasheri, Ndre Mjeda, Asdreni, also the Codex of Berat, and the Albanian language in Dubrovnik's archives.
Janura was very active as a contemporary literature critic, especially of that originating in Yugoslavia. His most important monographs are Për historinë e alfabetit shqip (For the history of the Albanian alphabet) of 1969 which remains one of the first studies on the diachrony of the Albanian language, and Migjeni (Migjeni) of 1982, both published in Skopje. The book on Migjeni's work (Millosh Gjergj Nikolla) is a monograph of 326 pages and is one of the first in the history of Albanian literature. It is arranged in four sections. The first covers the poet's life important moments and how they affected his work, the second and largest section covers the poet's work in the prism of the Albanology. The monograph led the way to many following studies on Migjeni's work.
He was also the co-author of didactic textbooks for elementary schools. and a poetry collections for children.

== Publications ==
- Naim Frasheri. Work. (Naim Frasheri. Vepra), Beograd: Enti për botimin e teksteve i Republikës Socialiste të Sërbisë, 1963. OCLC 504735974.
- Early illuminist ideas of the Albanians of Polog (Ranite iluministički idei kaj Albancite vo Polog), Skopje 1983. OCLC 442193922.
- Migjeni, Sopje: Flaka e vëllazërimit, 1982. OCLC 440105087.
- For the history of the Albanian alphabet (Për historinë e alfabetit shqip), Skopje: Nova Makedonia, 1969. OCLC 50816250.
- Folk tales (Përralla popullore), as collector and editor, Skopje: Nova Makedonija, 1964.
- Crane, you hadji-beg (O lejlek haxhibek), Skopje: Nova Makedonija, 1968.
- Longing of the emigrants (Përmallimi i gyrbetçijve) of Milisav Antonijevic-Drimkolski, as translator, Pristina: Rilindja, 1958.
