= Odhise Grillo =

Albanian writer

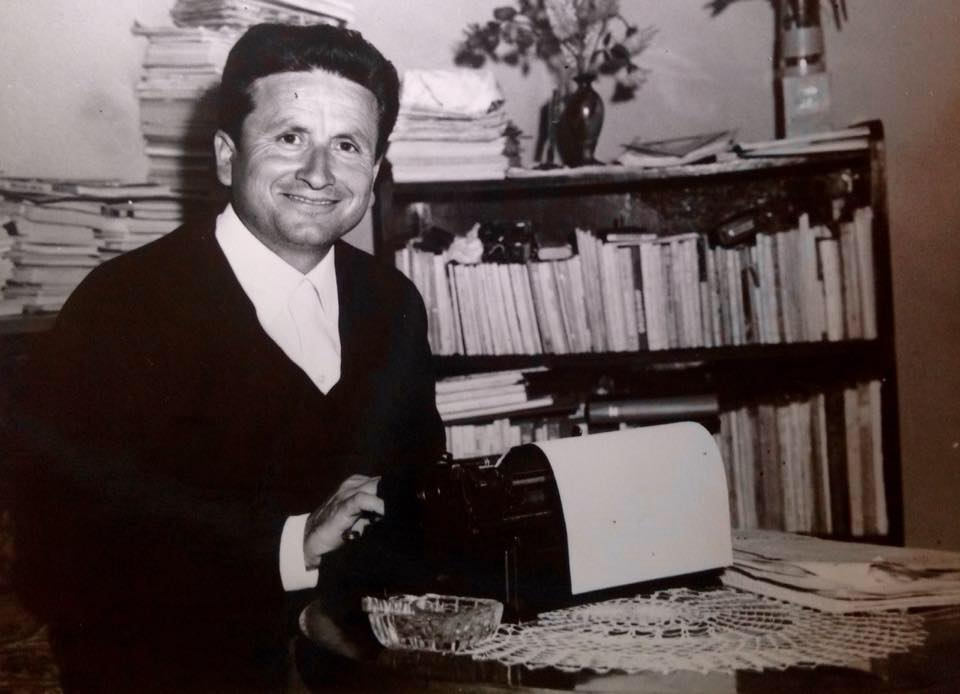
- Photo of Odhise Grillo
- Born: 21 March 1932 Vuno, Albanian Kingdom
- Died: 24 September 2003 (aged 71) Tirana, Albania
- Occupation: Writer
- Language: Albanian
- Genre: Children's literature

Odhise Kristo Grillo (1932–2003) was an Albanian writer of children's books.

== Biography ==
Grillo was born in 1932 in Vuno, where he went to elementary school. He completed middle school in the capital of Albania, Tirana. In 1962, he graduated from the Faculty of Philology as well as the Faculty of Law at the University of Tirana.

He started to work at the humour magazine, Hosteni, and later at the Naim Frashëri Publishing House as an editor for children's publications until he retired, although he went back to editing and writing at the Publishing House "Toena". He had publications in the magazines Drita, "Nëntori", "Ylli", "Zëri i Rinisë", Hosteni, Pionieri, "Fatosi", "Yllkat", and "Bota e fëmijëve". He was president of the International Association of Children's Writers, also a professor at the University of Tirana and the Aleksandër Xhuvani University. He was a recipient of many national literary prizes in Albania. Internationally he was translated into Greek, Macedonian, Italian, French, Dutch, and Arabic.

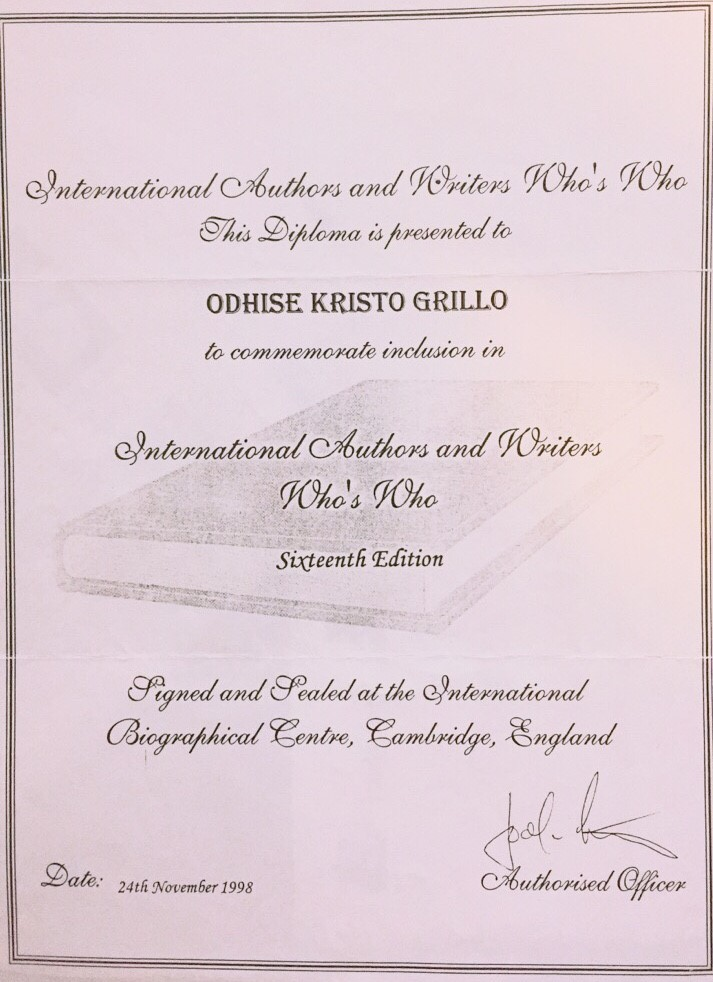
Diploma for Odhiso Grillo from the Authors and Writers Who's Who

In 2013 Milaim Nelaj published a monograph on Grillo.

Odhise Grillo died on 24 September 2003, in Tirana, Albania.

== Main works ==
- Shtatë ngjyrat
- Ai që mundi perandorin
- Balada e burrave të Vunoit
- Balada e lirisë
- Një zogë e një lule
- Zërat e fëmijërisë
- Njeriu i natës
- Pushkë në bregdetë
- Çamçakëzi
- Një njeri u bë majmunë
- Përtacukët
- Historia e Skënderbeut
- Lahuta e malësisë
- Tradhti në sarajet Topiase
- Don Kishoti i Mançës
- Erdhi dite e Arbrit
- Thike Pas Shpine
- Jeta ime pas vdekjes
