= Adem Doğan =

Turkish footballer (born 2001)

Personal information
- Date of birth: 5 October 2001 (age 25)
- Place of birth: Kocasinan, Turkey
- Position: Centreback

Team information
- Current team: Güzide Gebzespor
- Number: 30

Youth career
- 2013–2018: Kayserispor

Senior career*
Years	Team	Apps	(Gls)
2018–2021	Kayserispor	3	(0)
2019–2020	→ 52 Orduspor (loan)	7	(0)
2021	→ Düzcespor (loan)	12	(0)
2021–2022	Niğde Anadolu	10	(0)
2022–2023	Orduspor 1967	44	(2)
2023–2024	Çorum	5	(0)
2024–2025	Beyoğlu Yeni Çarşı	24	(0)
2025–	Güzide Gebzespor	14	(0)

International career^{‡}
2018	Turkey U18	2	(0)
2020	Turkey U19	1	(0)
- * Club domestic league appearances and goals as of 7 December 2025 ‡ National team caps and goals as of 12 October 2020

Adem Doğan (born 5 October 2001) is a Turkish professional footballer who plays as a centre back for TFF 2. Lig club Güzide Gebzespor.

== Professional career ==
A youth product of Kayserispor, Adem made his professional debut for them in a 3–2 Süper Lig loss to Yeni Malatyaspor on 18 May 2018, at the age of 16

On 3 September 2019, he joined 52 Orduspor on a season–long loan deal.
