= Hajro Ulqinaku =

Montenegrin writer (born 1938)

- Born: 3 April 1938 (age 88); Ulcinj, Kingdom of Yugoslavia (now Montenegro)
- Citizenship: Montenegrin
- Education: Universiteti i Prishtinës
- Occupations: Writer, novelist, journalist

Hajro Ulqinaku (born April 3, 1938) is an Albanian writer from Ulcinj, Montenegro.

== Life ==
Hajro was born on 3 May 1938 to an Albanian family in Ulcinj, Montenegro. He finished the primary and secondary school in Ulcinj and the university studies in Universiteti i Prishtinës in Pristina, Kosovo.

== Works ==
=== Books for children ===
- Fëmijët e detit
- Margaritarët e zinj
- Çelësi i artë
- Kolovajza e florinjtë e Hënës
- Mbrëmje pulëbardhash
- Fëmijëria në bregdet
- Gjiri i Shpresës
- Ligji i detit
- Ani, Ben, Ani
- Bukuria e detit
- Panorama e detit
- Thesari i piratëve
- Pëllumbat në antenë
- Mos qaj Kestrina
- Barka me vela
- Limani i Qetësisë
- Lulekuqet mbi banka
- Ishulli i Gjelbër
- Libri për detin 6 + 1

=== Dramas ===
- Tërë bota Kosovë!

=== Scientific books ===
- Deti, detarët e Ulqinit
- Detarë, peshkatarë, ulqinakë
- Detaria, detarë, dokumente
- Libri për Ulqinin dhe ulqinakët
- Glosar
- Thesar popullor
