= Julia Gjika =

Albanian poet

- Born: Julia Naçi; 1 July 1949 (age 77); Gjirokastër, Albania
- Occupation: Poet
- Writing career
- Language: Albanian

Julia Gjika (born 1 July 1949) is an Albanian-born poet living in the United States. She is one of the few writers publishing in the Albanian language and writes poetry as well working as a journalist. Her poems have been praised by her peers and have been included in several publications of collected works.

== Biography ==
Julia Naçi was born on 1 July 1949 in Gjirokastër, Albania during the Enver Hoxha dictatorship, which imposed strict sanctions and censorship on literature allowing no development of literary markets until the 1970s. In spite of the ban, Gjika studied finance at Ushtarake Academy and Albanian literature at university.

She served as editor of the magazine 10 Korriku (10 July) and was chief financial officer in various military units in Korçë and Tirana. She was one of a group of "military poets," women who served together in the Albanian military and wrote poems, which included award-winning poet Iliriana Sulkuqi. Gjika published two works in Albania, her first book Ditëlindje (Birthday) in 1971 and the second Ku Gjej Poezinë (Where I Find Poetry) in 1978.

She immigrated to the United States in 1996 and took advantage of the absence of censorship. She is a regular contributor to the press of the Albanian-American diaspora in such works as Dielli and Iliria as well as in the Albanian publications Shqip and Korça, in which she writes about the lives of immigrants in America and other places the diaspora have settled, culture, and social issues.

Gjika's work is well respected by her peers in eastern Europe and has been included in published collections of poetic works. Jan M. Stuchlý, a Moravian lawyer and writer, has published three collections of poems from those he considers to be "masterpieces." He included Gjika's work in his 1998 collection. A recent publication by Raimonda Moisiu, Letrat shqip këndej e përtej Atlantikut (Letters Slip Here and Across the Atlantic) included works by Gijika, in his attempt to preserve those voices he deems "masters of dialogue and conversation, who communicate artistic values".

She is married to the scientist Thanas Gjika and has a daughter.

== Selected works ==
- Ku Gjej Poezinë (Where I Find Poetry) (1978)
- Muzg : (vëllim poetik) (2008)
- Ëndrra e Kthimit (The Dream of Return) (2010)
- Oxhaku famëmadh Zogu : album historik i përzgjedhur me esse, ligjërata, kujtime..., etj. (with Ramiz Lushaj)
- Legjenda shqiptare e Rozafatit (The Albanian legend of Rozafat) (with Rozi Theohari, Niko Dako & Pandi Mele)
- Ëndrrra e kthimit : poezi (with Stavri Sharxhi)
- Jorgjie Misa, sopranoja me zë të veçantë që e "zbuluan" rusët
- Jeta e vërtetë - jeta në shërbim të njerëzve
- Vals me jetën : tregim
- Dielli zbret ngadalë nëpër shkallë të arta : poezi
- Lojë luftash : poezi
- Amerikë për mua është Korça ime e dashur : (portret për mjekun stomatolog, Spiro Bimbli, në 70 vjetorin e lindjes)
- Nga kampet e përqëndrimit drejtoreshë e "Ralph Lauren" : [Edlira Merlika Hepburn] (with Edira Merlika (Hepburn))
