= Brikena Smajli =

Albanian writer

Brikena Smajli (born 1970) is an Albanian writer, and a lecturer at the European University of Tirana.

Smajli was born in Shkodra, where she still lives. She has been described as "a fine representative of a new generation of female writers in Albania".

== Selected publications ==
- Përdite ndërtoj shtëpi me ashkla (2006, Shtëpia Botuese albas: ISBN 9994388347
- Të fundit vdesin ulkonjat : poezi (1997, Shtëpia botuese "At Gjergj Fishta")
