= Filip Shiroka =

Albanian writer (1859–1935)

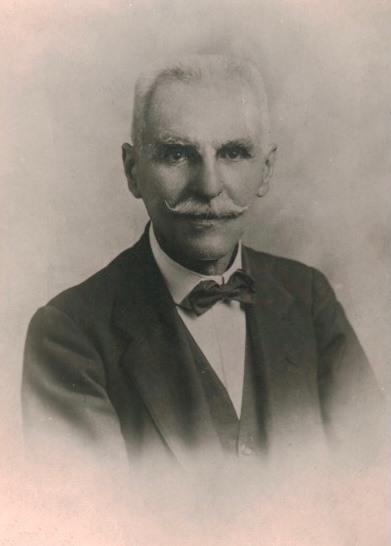
- Shiroka photographed by Kel Marubi, c. 1880-83
- Born: Filip Shiroka; 13 August 1859; Shkodër, Ottoman Empire (now Albania)
- Died: 14 November 1935 (aged 76); Beirut, State of Greater Lebanon
- Occupations: Poet, Engineer
- Writing career
- Language: Albanian, Italian

Filip Shiroka (13 August 1859 – 14 November 1935) was a classical Rilindja (Albanian: Renaissance) poet.

== Life ==
He was born and raised in Shkodër and educated there by the Franciscans. Among his teachers was poet Leonardo De Martino (1830–1923), whose influence is omnipresent in Shiroka's verse. In 1880 he participated as an irregular in the Battle of Ulcinj (1880). His earliest verse publication, All'Albania, all'armi, all'armi! ("To Albania, to arms, to arms!"), was a nationalist poem on the defense of Ulcinj, which was written in Italian and printed in the Osservatore Cattolico]l (Catholic Observer) of Milan in 1880. After the defeat of the League of Prizren, he emigrated to the Middle East, and settled in Egypt and, later, in Lebanon where, helped by then Governor Pashko Vasa, he worked as an engineer in railway construction. Shiroka became a member of a society named "Vëllazëria Shqiptare" (Albanian brotherhood) that was founded in Cairo during 1894 by Albanian expatriates.

== Writing ==
Shiroka's nationalist, satirical and meditative verse in Albanian was written mostly from 1896 to 1903. It appeared in journals such as Faik Konitza's Albania, the Albanian periodicals published in Egypt, and the Shkodër religious monthly Elçija i Zemers t'Jezu Krisctit ("The Messenger of the Sacred Heart"). Shiroka, who also used the pseudonyms Gegë Postripa and Ulqinaku, is the author of at least sixty poems, three short stories, articles and several translations, in particular of religious works for Catholic liturgy. His verse collection, Zâni i zêmrës, Tirana, 1933, ("The voice of the heart"), which was composed at the turn of the century, was published by Ndoc Nikaj two years before Shiroka's death in Beirut.

== Writing style ==
Shiroka's verse, inspired by early-19th-century French and Italian romantic poets such as Alfred de Musset (1810–1857), Alfonse de Lamartine (1790–1869), and Tommaso Grossi (1790–1853), whom he had read as a young man in Shkodër, does not cover any unusual thematic or lexical range, nor is it all of literary quality, though the latter assertion is no doubt valid for most Rilindja poets. Shiroka is remembered as a deeply emotional lyricist, and as one of linguistic purity, who was obsessed with his own fate and that of his distant homeland. Recurrent in his work, there is the theme of nostalgia for the country of his birth.

Here is a translation of Shiroka's "Be Off, Swallow":

Farewell, for spring has come,
Be off, swallow, on your flight,
From Egypt to other lands,
Searching over hill and plain
Be off to Albania on your flight,
Off to Shkodër, my native town!

Convey my greetings
To the old house where I was born,
And greet the lands around it
Where I spent my early years;
Be off thither on your flight,
And greet my native town!

Go to that school where I studied
With my friends, my childhood friends;
Go to that Church where I first wished
God's Blessing.
Be off thither on your flight,
And greet my cousin!

With those men, with those hills,
with those streams around you,
In those fields that Shkodër has for me,
That bloom, stop there.
Singing with sweetness,
Greet my city!

I could fly too,
I would set off with you,
I would pass through Shkodër,
And see that place with my own eyes again!
But—you go there—fly --
And you cry my fate!

And when you reach the Field of Rmajit,
Swallow, stop there and take your rest.
In that place of mourning are the graves
Of the mother and father who raised me.
Weep in your exquisite voice
And lament them with your song!

For ages I have not been to Albania
To attend those graves.
You, swallow, robed in black,
Weep there on my behalf,
With that exquisite voice of yours,
Lament them with your song!

== Sources ==
- Vila, Besa (1986), Zani i zemrës dhe shkrime të tjera (in Albanian), Tirana: Naim Frashëri Publishing House
