= Faruk Myrtaj =

Albanian writer

- Born: 4 March 1955 (age 71); Vlora, Albania
- Occupations: Novelist; poet; translator; journalist; engineer
- Writing career
- Period: 1985–present

Faruk Myrtaj (born 4 March 1955 in Selenicë, Vlora, Albania) is an Albanian novelist, poet, translator and engineer. Myrtaj was born in a small mining town in Vlora. He was deprived the right for higher education (University) because of the communist regime, then in power. Only after 9 year was given to him the possibility to continue University, in the Mining Engineering Faculty of the University of Tirana, where he graduated in 1988.

Since his first book, published in 1985, he has constantly written poetry, short stories, novels, essays and translated different Canadian authors. His book "Nudo zyrtare" ("Official Nudo") has won the Prize "Best short stories book for 1996", given by the Ministry of Culture and Sports of Albania in 1997. Among others Myrtaj has worked as a journalist and professional translator. Since 2003 he lives in Canada with his family. Faruk Myrtaj is member of The Writers’ Union of Canada.

== Works ==
=== Poetry ===
- "Dielli i nëntokës" (1985)
- "Rroba e fjalëve gjithnjë ngushtë më rri" (1991) - Tirana, Albania. "Naim Frashëri" Publishing House

=== Short stories ===
- "Njerëz që kam njohur" (1987)
- "Marrëveshje për të jetuar" (1989)
- "Nudo Zyrtare" (1996) – Tirana, Albania.
- "Njerëzit janë tepër" (2000) - Shkup, Macedonia. "Vatra" Publishing House
- "Luftëtarët vriten në paqe" (2003) – Prishtinë, Kosovo. "Dukagjini" Publishing House
- "Hijet e Virgjëreshave" (2006) – Tirana, Albania. "Arbëria" Publishing House

=== Novels ===
- "Qyteti i Ministrave"(1998) – Tirana, Albania. "Toena" Publishing House.
- "Atdhè Tjetër" (2012)

=== Essays ===
- "Përse druhemi nga nacionalizmi" (1995)
- "Markezë shqiptarë" (2002)
- "How I discovered Canada through its Literature"; "Speaking in Tongues", PEN Canada and Writers in Wxile, BANFF Center Press, 2005.

== Translations into Albanian ==
- "Tolerance, the threshold of peace" Betty Reardon, UNESCO.
- "The power of G.G.Marquez", Jon Lee Anderson
- "The best stories of William Saroyan"
- "No Great Mischief", Alistair MacLeod
- "The Grass Harp", Truman Capote
