= Arshi Pipa =

Albanian-American writer

- Born: 28 July 1920; Shkodër, Principality of Albania
- Died: 20 July 1997 (aged 76); Washington, D.C., United States
- Citizenship: Albanian, United States
- Education: PhD on philosophy
- Alma mater: University of Florence
- Occupation: Philosopher
- Writing career
- Language: Albanian, English, French, Italian
- Period: 1944–1995
- Genres: Epic poetry, literary criticism

Arshi Pipa (28 July 1920 – 20 July 1997) was an Albanian American writer, philosopher, poet and literary critic.

== Biography ==
Arshi Pipa was born on 28 July 1920 in Shkodër and attended school there until 1938. Pipa received a BA equivalent degree ("Laurea") in philosophy at the University of Florence in 1942. After he completed his studies he was a teacher of Italian language in different schools in Albania.

He was imprisoned for ten years (1946–56) in Communist Albania because he antagonized the communist regime with his recitation of a verse from a "Song of the Flea" by Goethe found in a translation of Faust. After he was released from prison (his original sentence was 20 years, but after amnesty it was cut to 10) he escaped to Yugoslavia and lived in Sarajevo during the period 1957–9. In 1959 he emigrated to the United States where he taught at Adelphi College, Georgetown University, Columbia University, and UC Berkeley. Then, from 1966 to 1989, he was a professor of Italian literature in the Department of Romance Languages at the University of Minnesota.

Pipa died in Washington DC on July 20, 1997.

== Work ==
The first poetry Pipa composed in late 1930, Lundërtarë [Seamen], was published in Tirana in 1944. When he was in prison he thought out and actually wrote some parts of his best-known collection of poems, Libri i burgut [The Prison Book], published in 1959. His epic poem Rusha (1968), composed in 1955 during his imprisonment, describes love between Albanians and Serbs in the late 14th century.

Pipa claimed that the unification of the Albanian language was wrong because it deprived Albanian language of its richness at the expense of Gheg. He called the unified literary Albanian language a "monstrosity" produced by the Tosk communist leadership, who conquered anti-communist north Albania and imposed their Tosk Albanian dialect on the Ghegs.
