= Leon Qafzezi =

Albanian writer and filmmaker (born 1953)

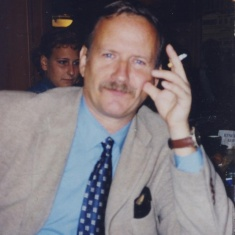
- Qafzezi in October 2000
- Born: February 23, 1953 (age 73); Tirana, Albania
- Education: Academy of Arts of Albania
- Occupations: Writer, film director
- Years active: 1972-present
- Known for: TV Documentaries
- Notable work: Historiku i Kinematografise Boterore (2008)

Leon Qafzezi (born 23 February 1953 in Tirana, Albania) is an Albanian writer and cineaste.

== Life ==
Leon Qafzezi was born 23 February 1953 in Albania, the son of Niko Qafzezi and Amalia Qafzezi (Zheji). He studied at the Academy of Arts of Albania (1974–1976). Qafzezi lives and works in Tirana.

== Career ==
Since 1986 he has worked as producer, director, inspector of film, for the "New Albania" Film Studio (Albanian: Kinostudio Shqipëria e Re) and "Alb-Film-Distribution"(1986–1992). During 1993–1998, he worked for the Albanian National Television (RTVSH) in the Department of Film, Department of Programming, and as director, as well as a freelance journalist in Bashkimi (The union), Skena dhe Ekrani (The scene and the screen), and Ylli (The star) magazine as a film critic.

In 1992. he co-founded FILM magazine together with Piro Milkani and Vasil Tabaku, and is chief editor of the magazine. He also directs the "Eagle Film Albania", a private held cinematographic society.

Qafzezi is a member of the Albanian League of Writers and Artists since 1997, and of the "Union of Albanian Cineasts", and since 2000 of the "Albanian Journalists League”.

== Published works ==
=== Novels ===
- Passport to Hell, Aferdita, 1997
- The Sky Down, Eagle Film Albania, 1998
- The Market of Dreams, Toena, 1998. ISBN 99927-1-056-X
- The Black Hole, Toena, 1998. ISBN 99927-1-098-5
- The Prostitute of Abuokir, 2008
- Selected Novels, Morava, 2011. ISBN 978-9928-120-09-0

=== Poetry ===
- No Love for Credit, Eagle Film Albania, 1992
- Eda, Eagle Film Albania, 1996
- Funeral of Lives, Morava, 2012. ISBN 978-9928-120-66-3

=== Monographs ===
- Author, Toena, 1999. ISBN 99927-1-160-4
- Godard, Toena, 2002
- Kubrick, 2002

=== Studies and critics for films ===
- Great Directors, Eagle Film Albania, 1993
- Directors Portrait, Toena, 1996
- Albanian Film and Time, Eagle Film Albania, 2002
- Interview for Film, Eagle Film Albania, 2002
- With Keep Movies, Eagle Film Albania, 2003
- The History of World Cinematography, INFBOTUES, 2008. ISBN 978-99956-682-3-5
- Metamorphosis of the Transition of Dictatorship to Democracy, Turdiu, 2024. ISBN 978-9928-4783-8-2
- The Passion for Film, Turdiu Publication, 2025. ISBN 978-9928-833-10-5
- Film Criticism, Turdiu Publication, 2025. ISBN 978998833273

=== Documentary-Filmography ===
- 1974 – Don't Forget My Son (screenplays), National competition
- 1990 – Directors 90 (screenplays)
- 1992 – Headache Without Head (director, co-screenplays)
- 1993 – Man of Free Words (director, screenplays)
- 1993 – In Film Way (director, screenplays)
- 1993 – The Light of City (director, screenplays)
- 1994 – Poet and Inquisition (director, screenplays)
- 1994 – Nation, Religion, Country (director)
- 1994 – One Painter in New York (director)
- 1994 – Join in Diaspora (director, co-operator)
- 1995 – Children's Dreams (director, screenplays, producer)
- 1995 – Courage in Cinematography (director, screenplays)
- 1996 – Ismail Kadare and Sabato (screenplays, operator)
- 1996 – One Painter in Paris (screenplays, operator)
- 1996 – Omer Kaleshi (screenplays, operator)
- 1996 – Paris–Paris (director, operator)
- 1996 – Avalanche (screenplays, operator)
- 1996 – Directors Way (director, screenplays, operator)
- 1997 – Sipa-Press (direction, screenplays, operator)
- 1997 – My Heard Refren (director, screenplays, operator)
- 1997 – The Father of Albanian Circus (director, operator)
- 1998 – Krantia Our Dirigent (director, producer, director of photography)
- 1998 – The Struggle to Be Man (director, director of photography)
- 1999 – Message of Humanism (director, screenplays, director of photography), 2 series
- 2000 – Message of Love (director, screenplays, producer, director of photography)
- 2003 – WHO (director, screenplays, director of photography)
- 2003 – A. Moissi (director, co-screenplays, director of photography)
- 2004 – Sue Ryder Care (director, screenplays, director of photography)

=== Collaborations with magazines ===
- FILM, 1992–2002
- Film Image, 1997 (Album photography)
