= Veli Karahoda =

Albanian writer, poet, novelist and essayist

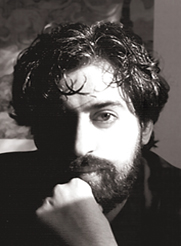
- Karahoda in 2003
- Born: 4 January 1968 (age 58); Prizren, SAP Kosovo, SR Serbia, SFR Yugoslavia (now Republic of Kosovo)
- Occupation: Writer

Veli Karahoda (born 4 January 1968) is an Albanian writer, poet, novelist and essayist. He studied at the University of Pristina, Faculty of Arts.

== Published books ==
=== Novels ===
- Kafka's Albanian Castle, 1991, Gjon Buzuku Publishing House, Pristina.
- The Demons, 2000, Rilindja Publishing House, Pristina.
- The Seven Last Words, 2003, Gjon Buzuku Publishing House, Pristina.
- The Serpent and The Shadow, 2015, Gjon Buzuku Publishing House, Pristina.
- The inglorious end of Igor Bagricki, 2023, Gjon Buzuku Publishing House, Pristina.

=== Novellas / Short stories ===
- Sirius and Other Stories, 1994, Rilindja Publishing House, Pristina.
- Lucrecia, 1995, Rilindja Publishing House, Pristina.

=== Poetry ===
- Yellow Hourglass, 1992, ArtCenter Publishing Company, Pristina.
- The Academy, 1993, BlendAS Publishing Company, Pristina.

=== Essays ===
- The Fair of Corpses (Essays on literature, philosophy, art, aesthetics.), 1992, ArtCenter Publishing Company, Pristina.
