= Majlinda Nana Rama =

Albanian writer and literati (born 1980)

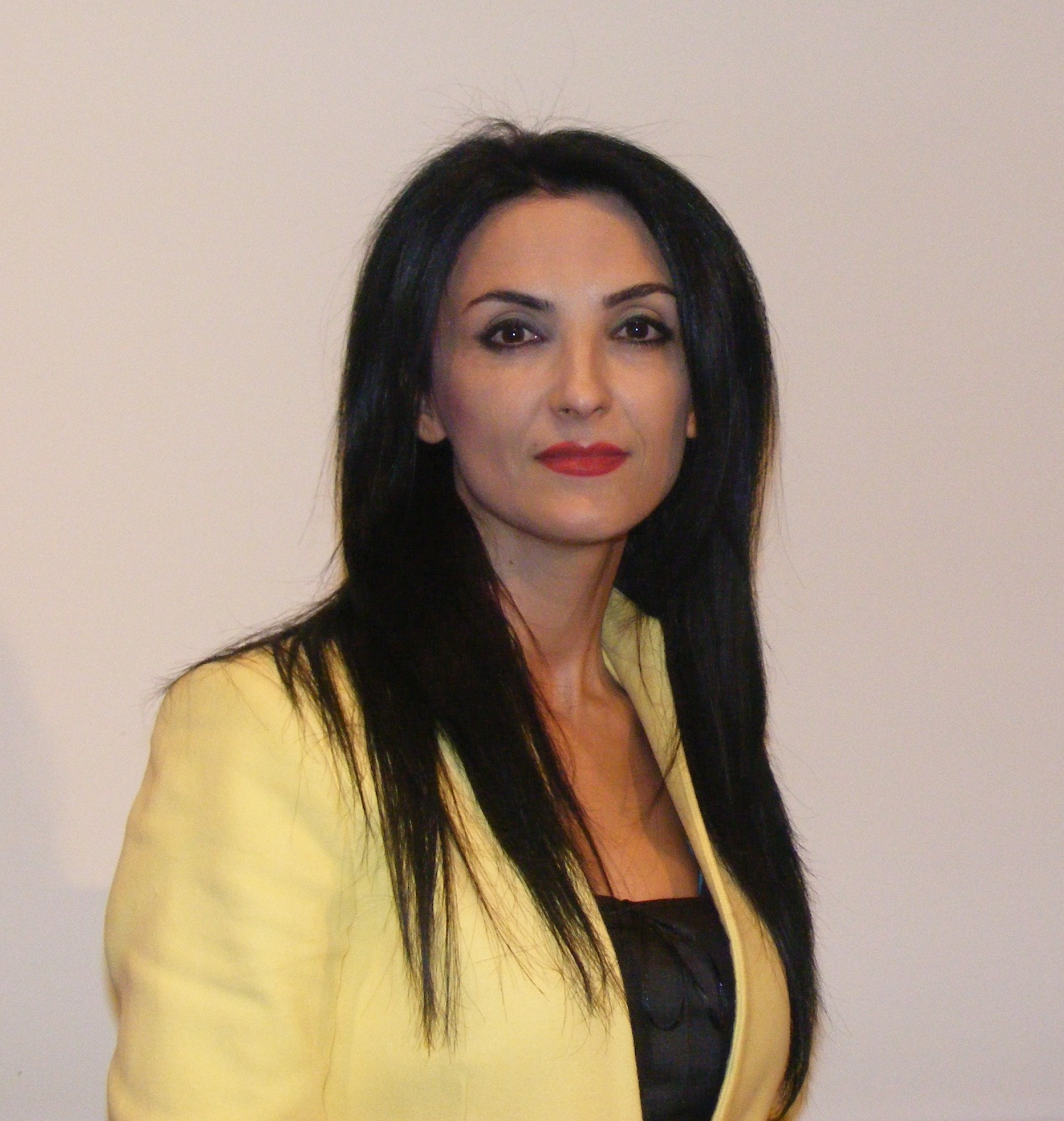
- Born: 27 May 1980 (age 45) Tepelene, Albania
- Occupation: Writer, literary critic, journalist
- Education: University of Tirana, Faculty of Philology

Majlinda Nana Rama (born May 27, 1980) is an Albanian pedagogue, writer and researcher. Her works include poetry, essays, scientific articles, studies, literary criticism, novels and short stories. She is a lecturer at the University of Arts, Tirana.

== Early life and education ==
Majlinda Nana Rama was born in Tepelena, where she received her primary and secondary education. She completed higher studies in Albanian Literature and Language in Tirana (1998–2002). In 2012, she graduated from the Faculty of Political Science with a degree in International Relations. In 2014 she received the title of Master of Science in Political and Legal Sciences.

== Career ==
She has worked as an administrator of "SHSSH" and as a teacher of Albanian Language and Literature. Since 2004 she has been working in several media. She has been a journalist for the national newspaper Panorama since 2006. She has been the director of the Information Department at the "Apollon" television. She has also worked as a journalist for "Ora News" television, TV "Klan" television and "Abc News" television. She is an author, screenwriter, and show manager for social, cultural, and political. She works in the Municipality of Fier and is the executive director of the Cultural Foundation "Harpa". She is the founder and director of the National Book Fair "Fieri". She is a member of the WPS (League of Contemporary Poets of the Globe).

As a writer, Majlinda Rama became known with the novel Emperors, which was praised for its sharp theme, treatment and fable fusion. The novel was made into a film in Switzerland. She writes in several genres, including lyrics, epics, romance, drama and tragedy. In 2019, she was included in the study column of academician Ali Aliu on the work of the best contemporary authors. Her literature has been promoted and translated in several countries, including Kosovo, Macedonia, Montenegro, Germany, France, Switzerland, Austria, Belgium, Poland, the Netherlands, Hungary, Spain. The foreign press has compared her to Dostoevsky, A. Chekhov and Alexander Griboyedov.

== Bibliography ==
Novels

- Emperors – novel – 2014;
- The Lady in Red – novel, 2015;
- Escape – novel, 2016;
- Return – novel, 2017;
- Arzoe – Novel, 2019;

Poetry

- Take me tear hostage – (Poetry) – 2004;
- Moon of my sky – (Poetry) – 2006;
- Anthology of poetic prose – 2017;
- Wild Flowers – poetry, Skopje, 2017;
- Lyric with pain – poetry, Onufri, 2020;

Nonfiction

- But the trial continues (Essay) – 2006;
- Literary Criticism – studies, criticism, essays, journalism, Skopje, 2014;
- The polycentric logic of a new state – studies, 2016;
- Defined concept of an economic model – studies, 2016;
- Poetic code of Agoll – monograph, 2018;
- Moving messages (On the poetry of Ali Podrimja) – monograph, 2018;
- Literary Notes – Studies, literary criticism, 2019.

== Prizes ==
- Finalist of the National Prize for Literature awarded by the Ministry of Culture, Albania, (2020);
- International Award "Woman 2019" awarded by Universum Academy, Switzerland;
- Finalist of the "Kadare Award" (2018);
- Award "Best Poetic Book" ("Wild Flowers") given at the XX International Fair of Prishtina (2017);
- First Prize in Macedonia awarded by the Ministry of Culture, Macedonia (poetry);
- "Faik Konica" Award for Best Literary Criticism;
- She was declared "Ambassador of Peace", Tirana, Albania;
- "Naim Frashëri" Award, given at the Albanological Institute, Prishtina;
- "Esad Mekuli" Award, given to the National Library in Kosovo;
- “Mountains Hour” Award, given in Rozaje, Montenegro;
- “Poetic Muse” Award, given in Mat, Albania;
- She was announced "Man of the Year" in 2014, Tirana, Albania;
- Award "Poetic Muse 2012", given in Tirana, Albania.
