= Skënder Temali =

Albanian writer, poet and schoolteacher (1946–2021)

Skënder Temali (30 July 1946 – 17 April 2021) was an Albanian writer, poet, journalist and teacher.

== Life and career ==
Temali was born in Shkodër, Albania, on 30 July 1946. He studied Albanian language and literature at the Luigj Gurakuqi University of Shkodër.

For fifteen years he worked as an editor in Shkodër's press, Radio Shkodra, and the magazine 10 Korriku. He then spent around twenty-five years as a literature teacher and school administrator in Shkodër high schools.

He began writing poetry and prose in high school and continued throughout his life, publishing over 22 volumes of poetry, short stories, and novels since 1971. Some of his works were translated into foreign languages. In 2018 his short story collection This Winter No Snow Fell (Këtë dimër nuk ra dëborë) was published in Montenegrin by the Center for Preservation and Development of Minority Cultures of Montenegro.

Temali received several literary prizes. In 2001, with the short story Shoes of Shame (Këpucët e turpit), translated into Italian, he was awarded the Special Jury Prize at the 7th International Contest of the “Cristalide” Writers’ and Artists’ Association in Italy. In 2015, with the poem Me, the Balkans and Europe (Unë, Ballkani dhe Europa), the Kosovo Writers’ League awarded him the “Adem Demaçi” prize at the “Drini poetik” manifestation. He was also honored by the Montenegrin PEN Club.

Between 2013 and 2017 he was president of the Shkodër Writers’ Association and edited three collective anthologies titled The Pen of Shkodër (Pena e Shkodrës). He was active in promoting young authors and in cross-border cultural collaborations with Kosovo, Montenegro and North Macedonia.

== Death ==
Temali died in Shkodër on 17 April 2021, after contracting COVID-19.

== Selected works ==
Some of his published books include:

S’di të urrej... (I Do Not Know How to Hate) – poetry

Vajza që nuk putha (The Girl I Didn't Kiss) – poetry

This Winter No Snow Fell – short stories (translated into Montenegrin, 2018)

Një det pa dallgë s’është det (A Sea Without Waves Is Not a Sea) – aphorisms

Metamorfoza e inxhinier Brunos (The Metamorphosis of Engineer Bruno) – short stories

Të pathënat (The Unspoken) – poetry

Curriculum Vitae – poetry

Kur vuaj, shkruaj (When I Suffer, I Write) – poetry

Lirika të hershme dhe të vona (Early and Late Lyrics) – poetry

Tre shokët (The Three Friends) – children's poems

Studentja e Bolonjës (The Bologna Student) – poetry

Këpucët e turpit (Shoes of Shame) – short stories

Askushi (Nobody) – novel

Ballo në mbrëmjen e maturës (Ball at the Graduation Evening) – short stories

Stina e divorceve (The Season of Divorces) – novella
