= Valdete Antoni =

Albanian poet

Valdete Antoni (born 13 September 1953) is one of the best known Albanian contemporary poets. Lyricism, intimacy, sensitivity, thinking and symbolism define her poetry.

== Life ==
Valdete Antoni was born in Tirana, Albania. She graduated with High Honors from the Tirana University, Faculty of Politics & Juridical Sciences, Department of Journalism (1975). She has been working since 1977 and onwards, at the Tirana Radio, National Radio & Television.

Antoni is the author of a large number of radio dramas, radio shows on art and culture. During her experience as a journalist she has prepared, conducted a noted number of programs related to the history of the ancient civilization, history of arts and symbols, and has published in the written media, a number of articles for art personalities, especially in figurative art.

Antoni is one of the founders and ongoing member of the Albanian Forum of Journalists (2000). In such quality she has organized many workshops, for specialized culture and literacy journalism.

== Publications ==
- Dream in the wall (original title Ëndërr në mur), Pristine, "Ylberi": 1994
- My wall has got a shirt (Muri im ka veshur këmishë), Tirana, "Toena": 1997
- I saw my flight (E pashë fluturimin tim), Tirana, "Toena": 1999
- Enter in God’s chest (Hyj në kraharor zoti), Tirana, "Toena": 2001
- Wasted in Light Pole (Tretur në polen drite, Tirana, "Toena": 2005
- Dew Sound (Vesë Tingulli)- Selected poetry, Tirana, "Toena": 2011
- Lady Marmara (Marmara Hanim)- Novel, Tirana, "Toena": 2015

Antoni's poetry is published in the weekly literacy press and monthly cultural magazines such as Mehr Licht!, Anthology of Albanian Poets "Take te Larta", etc.

== Awards ==
- In 1999 the book "I Saw My Flight" ("E pashë fluturimin tim"), has been awarded with the first prize from the Albanian Association of Artists and Writers.
- In 2000, Antoni has been awarded as the Best Radio-Journalist of the Year, by Albanian Cultural Foundation "VELIJA".

== Sources ==
- Albanian Radio Television
- Valdeta Antoni Blog
- Pro Helvetia
- Mehr Licht! 2008Eurozine
- Mehr Licht! 25 (2005) Eurozine
- Ndryshe
- Poezirapsodet.com
- Lista e plote e botimevetoena.com.al
- "Marmara Hanëm, Valdete Antoni". Libraria ShtepiaeLibrit.com (in Albanian). 24 November 2015.
