= Irhan Jubica =

Albanian writer and poet (born 1973)

Irhan Jubica (born 1973 in Shkodra) is an Albanian writer and poet.

Jubica was editor-in-chief of Thyerje newspaper in 1994–95. He was also editor-in-chief of Orana Review, and co-ordinator of Pen-Club ORANA, an association of young Shkodra writers, since 1997. He was a cultural journalist for the Gazeta 55 from 1997 to 1999, and has also edited Fjala e Shkodres newspaper.

In 1996 he published his first poetry collection, Beduini i fundit (Orana), and in 1997 published his first prose book, Nata e Shen Valentinit (Marin Barleti). Selected parts of his work are published in many reviews in both Italian and English languages. He has published articles about culture and literature in the literary press and periodicals, as well as translations from Italian and English.

He is founder and editor of the Albanian Literary Review, "ARS", the first literary review published simultaneously in Albania, Kosovo and elsewhere.
