= Selfixhe Ciu =

Albanian writer (1918–2003)

Selfixhe Ciu (married name Selfixhe Broja, pen name Kolombja; 1918, Gjirokastër – 2003, Tirana) was an Albanian writer and the first Albanian woman writer to ever publish literature in Albania. On 28 November 1935, when she was 17, Selfixhe Ciu published under the plume name Kolombja, a poem on the Populli newspaper. She is part of the Albanian writers of the 1930s period. She was also one of the first Albanian feminists.

== Life ==
Born in Gjirokastër on March 31, 1918, Ciu was friends with Musine Kokalari, one of the first Albanian women to publish literature. She was studying in Florence, Italy, when the Italian invasion of Albania occurred, in 1939. She then returned to Albania with her husband, Xhemal Broja, and opened with him a book store in Shkodër. She joined the ranks of the Communist Party of Albania, along Drita Kosturi and Nexhmije Hoxha, and was one of the organizers of an illegal antifascist demonstration on February 22, 1942. For that she was arrested and condemned to death, but then later released. After World War II, in 1947, she was deported along with her husband Xhemal Broja. In 1966 she was deported for a second time. In 1998 Ciu published her memories, as well as poetry and other publications, into a book, entitled Tallazet e jetes (English: Winds of life). She died on August 22, 2003.
