= Betim Muço =

Albanian writer

- Born: 21 January 1947; Tirana, Albania
- Died: 15 January 2015 (aged 67); Rockville, Maryland, United States
- Occupations: Poet; writer; translator; seismologist
- Writing career
- Period: 1967–2015
- Literary movement: Postmodern literature

Betim Muço (21 January 1947 – 15 January 2015) was an Albanian writer, poet, translator, and seismologist.

== Biography ==
Betim Muço was born in Tirana, the capital of Albania, on January 21, 1947. He graduated in nuclear physics from the University of Tirana in 1970, specializing in seismology. He held a PhD in Earth Sciences. Muço's scientific career spans more than four decades. He contributed to the practice and development of seismology in Albania and the Balkans through his work at the Albanian Seismological Institute (1974 – 2001). He was head of the institution from 1993 to 1997. As director of the Seismological Network of Albania, he led several international and regional projects and published a wide array of scientific articles and books. From 1998 to 2005 Muço co-led two NATO Science for Peace projects on seismology. In 2001 he moved to the United States with his family, and received U.S. citizenship as an "Exceptional Ability Individual in the Sciences and Arts, who would substantially benefit prospectively the national economy, cultural or educational interests, or welfare of the United States."

From 2001 Muço lived and worked with his family in Rockville, Maryland, where he continued his scientific work. He was Science Editor and Translator at General Dynamics Information Technology and a consultant for the Incorporated Research Institutions for Seismology (IRIS) in Washington DC. He presented scientific papers in many conferences in the U.S. and Europe. He wrote a series of papers on the correlation between rain and earthquakes in the state of Virginia.

Muço was a writer and poet; his first poems were published when he was in high school in 1967 in Albania. He also wrote the lyrics of many songs. He went on to write and publish more than 25 books of poetry, short stories, novels and essays. He also wrote children's books, including three collections of fairy tales, dedicated to each of his three children. He won several literary awards in Albania and overseas. Many of his poems and short stories have been translated and published in literary anthologies, journals and magazines in English, Russian, French, Dutch, Romanian and Turkish.

He was also a translator into Albanian of works of Graham Greene, Saul Bellow, Yukio Mishima, Reiner Maria Rilke, James Joyce, Vladimir Nabokov, and Alice Munro. In 2008 he translated into Albanian an "Anthology of World Poetry of the 20th Century", one of the most comprehensive collections of poetry published in Albanian, including included translations of works by 135 world poets. On the evening before his death he was putting the finishing touches to his latest novel, "The Stars Are Quite Close," which is going to be published post-mortem.

Muço was honorary consul of Japan in Albania in the 1990s. During a post-doctorate program at the University of Tokyo (1990–1991), he developed close ties with Japan, its culture and especially its community of seismologists. Upon his return, he published a book of haiku (the first ever in Albanian) and a collection of essays on Japanese customs and culture.

== Primary career as a physicist ==
Muço studied physics at the Faculty of Natural Sciences of the University of Tirana, from which he graduated in 1970. After graduation he worked for four years as mathematics and physics teacher in the Krujë District, north of Tirana. In 1974 he moved back in the capital to work as a researcher in the Seismological Institute of the Academy of Sciences of Albania. From 1993 to 1997 he was Director of the Institute and, until 2001, was the head of the Seismological Network of Albania. In 2001 he emigrated to the United States. He was a specialist in the earth sciences, and collaborated or directed many international science projects in the field.

== Poet, fiction writer, and translator ==
Muço published his first poems when he was in high school: his first book of poetry On the roads of fatherland (Albanian: Rrugëve të Atdheut) was published in 1967. During over 30 years of literary activity, Betim Muço published more than 25 books of poems, short stories, novels and essays. He won several national literary awards, in Albania and abroad. Many of his poems and short stories were translated into literary anthologies, journals, and magazines of different countries.

Muço also translated into Albanian works of Saul Bellow, Yukio Mishima, Rainer Maria Rilke, James Joyce, Vladimir Nabokov, Alice Munro and others.

From 2001, he lived and worked in the United States until his death in January 2015 in Rockville, MD.

== Links to work ==
- From Poetry Magazine website
- From Poetry Soup website
- Some Poems from Poetry Soup website
- Muço, Betim (2014). "The atmospheric water as a triggering factor for earthquakes in the central Virginia seismic zone". Natural Hazards. 71: 135–150. doi:10.1007/s11069-013-0902-9. S2CID 129837014.
- Muço, Betim; Alexiev, Georgi; Aliaj, Shyqyri; Elezi, Zenun; Grecu, Bogdan; Mandrescu, Neculai; Milutinovic, Zoran; Radulian, Mircea; Ranguelov, Boyko; Shkupi, Defrim (2012). "Geohazards assessment and mapping of some Balkan countries". Natural Hazards. 64 (2): 943–981. doi:10.1007/s11069-012-0185-6. S2CID 129292861.
- Muço, Betim (2006). "Seismicity of the Adriatic Microplate and a Possile Triggering: Geodynamic Implication". The Adria Microplate: GPS Geodesy, Tectonics and Hazards. Vol. 61. pp. 351–367. doi:10.1007/1-4020-4235-3_24. ISBN 978-1-4020-4233-1.
- Muço, Betim (1998). "Twenty Years Seismic Monitoring of Induced Seismicity in Northern Albania". Seismicity Caused by Mines, Fluid Injections, Reservoirs, and Oil Extraction. pp. 151–162. doi:10.1007/978-3-0348-8804-2_9. ISBN 978-3-7643-6048-1. S2CID 128706945.
- Muço, Betim; Puka, Llukan (1993). "Periodic features of seismic activity in Albania". Pure and Applied Geophysics. 141 (1): 59–69. Bibcode:1993PApGe.141...59M. doi:10.1007/BF00876234. S2CID 128423146.
- Muço, Betim (1991). "Evidence for induced seismicity in the vicinity of Fierza reservoir, Northern Albania". Pure and Applied Geophysics. 136 (2–3): 265–279. Bibcode:1991PApGe.136..265M. doi:10.1007/BF00876377. S2CID 128974443.
- http://www.bssaonline.org/content/81/3/1015.extract
- http://www.setimes.com/cocoon/setimes/xhtml/en_GB/features/setimes/articles/2008/05/05/reportage-01
- http://www.geophysics.geol.uoa.gr/papers/makro/makro166.pdf
- "FTP link" (PDF). ftp.iris.iris.edu (FTP). (To view documents see Help:FTP)59
- From Recours au Poeme
