= Adem Zaplluzha =

Kosovan Albanian poet (1943–2020)

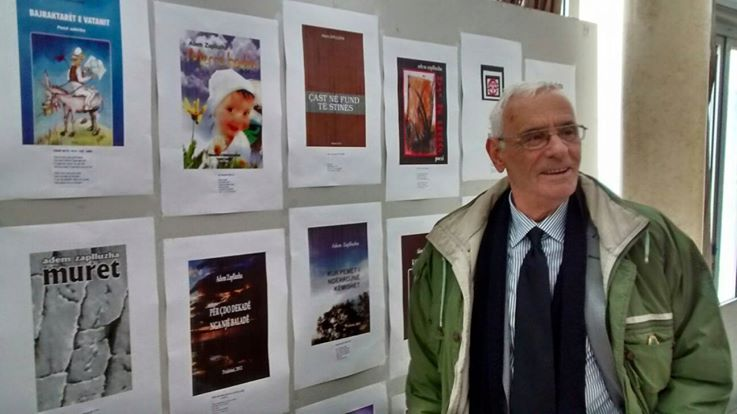
- Adem Zaplluzha at an exhibition in Prizren in 2015.
- Born: 1 February 1943
- Died: 9 November 2020 (aged 77)
- Education: University of Pristina
- Occupations: Poet, legal translator

Adem Zaplluzha (1 February 1943 – 9 November 2020) was a prolific Kosovan Albanian poet.

== Biography ==
Zaplluzha completed his primary and secondary education in his hometown, Prizren, and graduated from the School of Pedagogy at the University of Pristina. He worked as a teacher for a while in several villages near Prizren, then as a legal translator at the Kosovan Electricity Corporation, where he remained until the end of his career. He started writing and publishing literature from his childhood, with his first poem being published in 1957 in the Pionieri literary magazine. At the Kosovan Electricity Corporation, he co-founded the literary club Kosovan Poppies, which later published some of his works, most notably in the Ngjyra e Kohës (The colour of time) anthology. His works were published in a wide variety of literary and non-literary publications in Kosovo, Albania, Macedonia and Romania. He was a member of the Kosovan Writers Society.

In 2013, Zaplluzha was awarded the Lifetime Achievement Award by the Writers and Artists Club of Durrës, Albania. In the same year, the Albanian literary critic Fatmir Minguli published a collection of critical essays on his body of work in a book entitled Revoltë dhe meditim mbi poetikën e Adem Zaplluzhes.

== Selected poems ==
Zaplluzha extensive publication list includes the following:

- Puthje in Rilindja (Pristina), 1974
- Ecjet e viteve të mëdha in Jeta e Re (Prinstina), 1995
- Çamarrokët e Thepores in Shkëndija (Pristina), 1996
- Muret in Jeta e Re (Prinstina), 1997
- Morfologjia e dhembjes via Faik Konica (Prinstina), 2000
- Letër nga mërgimi via Fahri Fazliu Publishing House (Kastriot), 2007
- Udhëndarja via Fahri Fazliu Publishing House (Kastriot), 2008
- Asgjë sikur molla via Fahri Fazliu Publishing House (Kastriot), 2009
- Metafora e heshtjes via Fahri Fazliu Publishing House (Kastriot), 2010
- Merre kodin via Kastriot Writers' Association (Kastriot), 2011
- Më pëlqejnë mendimet e tua via Kastriot Writers' Association (Kastriot), 2012
- Pyesni zogjtë në ikje via Fahri Fazliu Publishing House (Kastriot), 2013
- Druri i pikëlluar via Fahri Fazliu Writers' Association (Kastriot), 2014
- Përtej portave të mbyllura via TREND Publishing House (Prinstina), 2015
- Kumritë prej deltine via TREND Publishing House (Prinstina), 2016
- Më pritni te baladat e gurit via TREND Publishing House (Prinstina), 2017
- Një stuhi prej bryme via TREND Publishing House (Prinstina), 2018
- Kur kyçen yjet e harresës via TREND Publishing House (Prinstina), 2019
- Mbetëm sërish në fillim via TREND Publishing House (Prinstina), 2020
