= Luljeta Lleshanaku =

Albanian poet (born 1968)

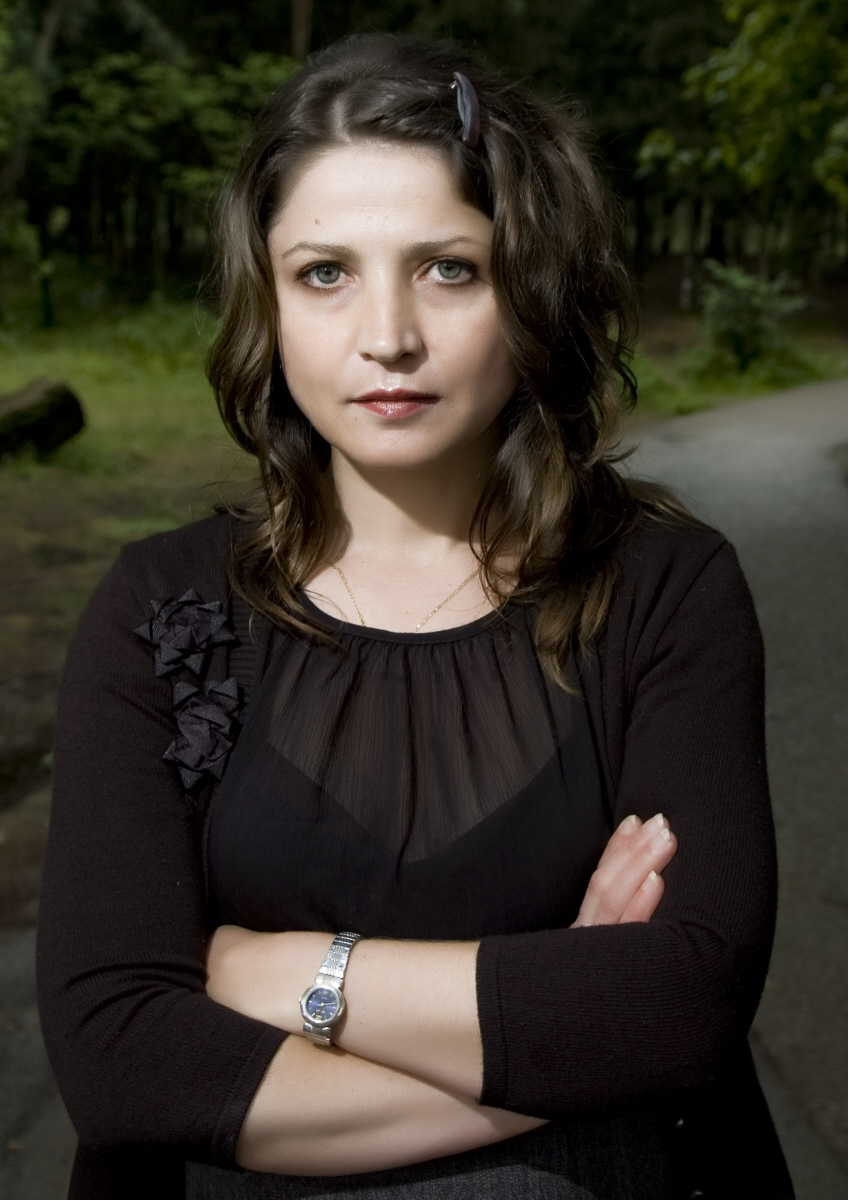
- Born: 2 April 1968 (age 58); Elbasan, Albania
- Occupation: poet
- Writing career
- Notable work: Fresco
- Literary movement: Imagism

Luljeta Lleshanaku (born 1968, in Elbasan, Albania) is an Albanian poet who is the recipient of the 2009 Crystal Vilenica award for European poets. She was educated in literature at the University of Tirana and was editor-in-chief of the weekly magazine Zëri i rinisë (The Voice of Youth). She then worked for the literary newspaper Drita (Light). In 1996, she received the best book of the year award from the Eurorilindja Publishing House. In 1999, she took part in the International Writers Program at the University of Iowa. She is the author of four poetry collections, one volume of which has been translated into English: Fresco, available from New Directions. The writer, critic and editor Peter Constantine, in his introduction to Fresco, sums up her style in this way:

Luljeta Lleshanaku is a pioneer of Albanian poetry. She speaks with a completely original voice, her imagery and language always unexpected and innovative. Her poetry has little connection to poetic styles past or present in America, Europe, or the rest of the world. And it is not connected to anything in Albanian poetry either. We have in Lleshanaku a completely original poet."

In the same introduction, Constantine further elaborates about Lleshanaku's style:

...one of the elements that distinguishes Luljeta Lleshanaku's poetry is the absence of direct social and political commentary. Her poetry's remarkable variety of themes, which avoids [sic] simplistic reactions to a terrible past and an unstable present and future, is perhaps one of the elements that makes her poems contemporary classics of world literature. The imagery and rhythms captured in the masterful translations gathered under these covers make her poems as compelling in English as they are in Albanian. She speaks individually to her readers, the mark of a true poet able to transcend time and culture.

In his afterword to Fresco, translator Henry Israeli added:

She is quiet but tough, and her raw brand of honesty and biting humor can offend as quickly as her innocence and sincerity can draw one back in. She can be as direct, critical, and perversely funny as she is in her poems, where, for instance, she states that "our breath disappearing in my lungs / is like lilies dropped into a cesspool." "In her verse, joy lives side by side with melancholy in a kind of symbiotic contradiction. Her lines can be exalting, playful, often bursting with a sense of wonder that is unmistakably youthful, and almost naïve. Her poems are highly imagistic, the connections between images precociously and precariously intuitive. They are, for the most part, short, contained studies, still lifes [sic] rendered abstractly, yet they soar within the boundless imagination of a speaker who delights in the sensual, the tactile, who "light as an Indian feather ... can easily reach the moon" and witnesses "asteroids dying like drones / in ecstasy for their love, their queen."

== Bibliography ==
- Fresco, New Directions Publishing, 2002 (translated by Henry Israeli, with an afterword by the same and an introduction by Peter Constantine)
- Child of Nature, New Directions Publishing, 2010
- Haywire: New & Selected Poems, Bloodaxe Books, 2011
- Negative Space, New Directions Publishing, 2018 (translated by Ani Gjika) (shortlisted for the 2019 Griffin Poetry Prize)
