= Mirko Gashi =

Albanian writer (1939–1995)

Mirko Gashi (Serbian Cyrillic: Мирко Гаши, romanized: Mirko Gaši; 2 January 1939 – 6 June 1995) was an Albanian writer. Born in Kralje, he studied journalism in Belgrade and worked as a journalist in Flaka e vëllazërimit in Skopje and in Radio Prishtina. He wrote poetry during the 1980s, producing collections Gjarpëri i shtëpise (The House Snake) (1980); Arbor vitae (The Tree of Life) (1988); and Plagë uji, (Water Wound) (1990). Gashi translated literature from Kosovo Albanian authors into Serbo-Croatian. In late years, he suffered from depression and alcoholism, which ended in his death in July 1995.
