= Kadrush Radogoshi =

Albanian poet, novelist, play-writer, and literary critic

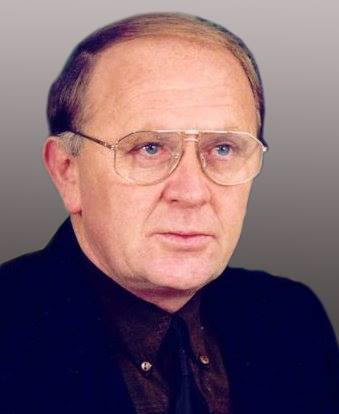

Kadrush Radogoshi (born 1948 in Gjakova, Kosova) is an Albanian poet, novelist, play-writer, and literary critic from Kosovo. He is a dissident who opposed the revocation of the autonomy of Kosovo from the Milosevic's regime, consequently being arrested and imprisoned. Radogoshi served as President of Writers' Union of Kosovo. In 2010, he settled in Canada.

== Life ==
He was born in Gjakova. He completed the primary school, the secondary school and the Teachers' College in Gjakova, whereas the Faculty of Philosophy in Pristina, where he also completed the postgraduate studies and received the Master of Arts in literature. From 1979 to 1986, he edited literary magazine Paths and edited several books of different literary genres.

Kadrush Radogoshi was president of Literary Club "Gjon Nikollë Kazazi" in Gjakova from 1992 to 1997. He worked as a teacher from 1969 to 1981, where after he was repeatedly imprisoned under section 133 of the Yugoslav criminal law forbidding freedom of speech. When Kosovo's nascent autonomy was revoked by Serbian leader Slobodan Milosevic, Radogoshi was one of 237 Albanian intellectuals arrested and imprisoned, and for 18 years, unable to practice his occupation, he was unemployed and politically persecuted.

After the Kosovo War (1998–99), Radogoshi worked as a professor of literature, until 2010, when he immigrated to Canada with his family. During this time he served as president (2007–09) and vice-president (2005–07) of the Union of Writers of Kosovo.

== Work ==
Kadrush Radogoshi has published poems, prose (short stories and novels), a drama, essays, and literary criticism.

- Në mes të heshtjes e këngës (Between the silence and the song), poems, Pristina: "Rilindja", 1981.
- Në udhëkryq (On the crossroad), poems, Pristina: "Rilindja", 1984.
- Poetika e romanit bashkëkohor shqiptar... (The poetics of the Albanian contemporary novels...), literary criticism, Faculty of Philosophy of University of Pristina, 1985.
- Nekrologji për Sodomën (Necrology for Sodom), poems, Pristina: "ZERI", 1991,
- Jeta artistike e Ilir Shkretës (Artistic life of Ilir Shkreta), novel, Pristina: "Rilindja", 1993.
- Interpretime (Interpretations), literary criticism, Pristina: "Rilindja", 1993.
- Heraldika e pikëllimit (Heraldry of sorrow), poems, Pristina: "Rilindja", 1997.
- Homo Dardanicus, novel, Pristina: "Rilindja", 2001.
- Adem Jashari dhe vdekja (Adem Jashari and death), drama, Pristina: "Rilindja", 2001.
- Nëpër universin letrar (Through the literary universe), literary criticism, Pristina: "Rilindja", 2003.
- Pikon çati e shpirtit (The roof of soul is leaking), poems, Pristina: Writers Union of Kosovo, 2004.
- Orfeu nga Vendenisi (Orpheus from Vendenis), poems, Pristina: Writers Union of Kosovo, 2005.
- Nëpër rrathët e ferrit serb (Through circles of the Serbian hell), memoirs, Pristina: Foundation for Literature, Art and Culture Generation ’81, 2000.
- Pikëllim i buzëqeshur (Smiling sorrow), poems, Pristina: "Buzuku", 2006.
- Semantika e bregut tjetër (Semantics of the other bank), literary criticism, Pristina: Writers Union of Kosovo, 2008.
- Çabrat antologjia - seancë e përshpirtshme (Chabrath anthology – a devout session), poems, Pristina: Writers Union of Kosovo, 2008.
- Seancë e përshpirtshme 2 (A devout session 2), poems, (bilingual book: English and Albanian), Pristina: Writers Union of Kosovo, 2014
- Laokooni (Laocoon), novel, Tirana, Toena, 2017
- Orpheus’ Palimpsest, poems in English, Tirana, Nacional, 2018
- Palimpsest orfeik 2, poems in Albanian, Tirana, Nacional, 2018
