= Ndriçim Ademaj =

Albanian-speaking poet and writer from Kosovo

Ndriçim Ademaj (born 1991) is an Albanian-speaking poet and writer from Kosovo. He is the author of four published works including three poetry books and one novel. He is presented as one of the representative members of Kosovo's new generation of authors. He has participated in several international literary festivals in Kosovo, Macedonia, Switzerland and France. His work has been featured in anthologies and literary magazines in Kosovo, Albania and abroad. In 2022, he is awarded the "Prix de la Francophonie" at the Sorbonne University International Poetry Contest for his poem "Le blues des anciens combattants".

== Published works ==
- Kërkoj diellin, 2008
- Dera, 2011
- Dera, 2012 (ISBN 978-9928-06-056-3)
- Dera, 2021
- Këngë nga Rruga e Farkëtarëve, 2015 (ISBN 978-9928-175-86-1)
  - Chants de la Rue des Forgerons, 2022 : French translation by Festa Molliqaj (ISBN 978-2-8290-0647-0)
- Pa heronj, pa bujë, 2017 (ISBN 978-9928-228-93-2)
  - Keine Helden weit und breit, 2022 : German translation by Florian Kienzle (ISBN 978-3-949045-13-4)
