= Ervin Hatibi =

Albanian poet, essayist, & painter (born 1974)

Ervin Hatibi (born May 31, 1974, Tirana, Albania) is an Albanian poet, essayist and painter. At the age of 14, Hatibi published his first poems in the literary pages of the main newspapers of the epoch. His first poetry collection Përditë Shoh Qiellin, Naim Frashëri, Tirana prefaced by Ismail Kadare, was published in 1989 when he was only 15 and was widely acclaimed by the critics of the communist regime. At that time, following the sudden fame of the young author and his grooming as future national poet of the communist state, the National Film Studios of Albania "Shqiperia e Re", produced a documentary film on his works, entitled "The 15 Year Old Poet".

== Early career ==
His first painting exhibition was held in spring 1991 at the National Gallery of Fine Arts. In 1992, while finishing up his studies at the School of Foreign Languages "Asim Vokshi" in Tirana, Ervin Hatibi co-founded the literary avant-garde magazine "e per-7-shme". In the ensuing years, he wrote extensively on matters of social and literary import, and also actively took part in youth movements, which preceded the democratic changes in his country. He wrote memorable lyrics for well-known pop singers and bands in Tirana, and had his own share of rock scene with his band, as a front man.

== Education ==
Having finished his studies in Albanian Literature & Language at the University of Tirana, and before moving to Jordan with the purpose of studying the Arabic language and Islamic Theology, Ervin Hatibi published his second and most notorious poetry collection 6, Tirana, 1995. From that point on his poetry was published in various anthologies on major Albanian poets: Anthology of Albanian Poetry, in Macedonian, Republic of Macedonia, 1998, Anthology of Contemporary Italian and Albanian Poetry, in Italian & Albanian, Italy, 1998, Three Albanian Poets, in Spanish, Spain, 2003, Lightning from the Depths: An Anthology of Albanian Poetry, Northwestern University Press, Evanston, Illinois, 2008, in English. During these years he served as editor in chief of Drita Islame magazine of the Muslim Community of Albania but resigned from his post as editor in chief of Drita Islame after the murder of Salih Tivari, the secretary general of Muslim Community.

== Writings ==
His most recent collection of poems, Pasqyra e Lëndës (Table of Contents), came out in 2004 in Albania. This book and many of his essays after 2000 reflect strong Islamic overtones.

Along the years Ervin Hatibi's writing has progressively intensified in the genre of essays. He has periodically written and published articles and essays in all major newspapers and magazines in Albanian: the leading Albanian newspaper Shekulli and the historical Albanian Macedonian magazine Lobi, Bota Shqiptare, in Italy and Fjala, in Albania, have also frequently been tribunes of his writings. Ervin Hatibi has written in length on issues related to culture, religion and arts.

His collection of essays, Republick of Albanania, Albania, 2005, is a collage of some of his essays written during this past decade where he displays his Sufi Islamic ideals regarding the reshape of the Albanian society.

Ervin Hatibi has exhibited his works in Paris, France 2003, Ferrara, Italy 2004, Skopje, Republic of Macedonia 2004, Istanbul, Turkey 2008. In 2007 he was called upon by the National Gallery of Fine Arts and the Ministry of Culture of Albania to curate the yearly international visual arts contest Onufri '07, Albania's most important visual art event.

== Works ==
- Përditë Shoh Qiellin, Naim Frashëri, Tirana, 1989
- Poezi, Marlin Barleti, Tirana, 1995
- Pasqyra e Lëndës, Ora, Tirana, 2004
- Republick of Albanania, Ora, Tirana, 2005
