= Adem Huskić =

Politician in Bosnia and Herzegovina

Adem Huskić (born 1955, Bugojno) is a member of the House of Representatives in Bosnia and Herzegovina. He is a member of the Party for Bosnia and Herzegovina led by Haris Silajdžić. In 2009 he called for the official recognition of January 27 as Holocaust Remembrance Day and July 11 as Srebrenica Genocide Remembrance Day. His proposal was voted down by Bosnian Serb MPs. Also together with MPs Remzija Kadrić and Ekrem Ajanović, he proposed to the BH parliament a change to the Criminal Code of Bosnia and Herzegovina where Holocaust, genocide and crimes against humanity denial would be criminalized. Huskić commemorated the passing of Marek Edelman, the famous Warsaw ghetto commander and friend of Bosnia & Herzegovina On 12.02,2010, Huskic's initiative to mark 27 January as Holocaust Remembrance Day finally passed the first stage in Parliament procedure after almost a year of resistance from Serb delegates.

He is also known as the Bosnian William Proxmire for his persistence in advocating for genocide victims.

Adem Huskić is a member of the Defense committee; Financial committee and the Law committee.
