= Iliriana Sulkuqi =

Albanian poet and journalist

Iliriana Sulkuqi (born 1951) is an Albanian poet and journalist living in the United States.

She was born in Elbasan and studied at the Skanderbeg Military University. After completing her education, she served as an officer in the academy and as a journalist for the military press until 1995, reaching the rank of lieutenant-colonel. She later worked for Drita, a newspaper published by the Albanian Writers Union. Sulkuqi moved to New York City in 2004. By 2010 she managed the publication of the literary magazine Pelegrin (Pilgrim).

She began to write while still young. Her work has appeared in various anthologies and been translated into English, Italian, Greek, Bulgarian, Romanian and Macedonian. She helped initiate and contributed to an anthology of writing by Albanian exiles entitled Perëndim i malluar (Waiting for the sunset). She is one of a number of Albanian poets who have written haiku in Albanian.

Sulkuqi has published 17 books of poetry. She has also contributed to Kësulkuqja (Little Red Riding Hood) magazine and “Perëndim i malluar” (Longing for the sunset), an anthology of works by Albanian writers in exile.

Sulkuqi has been a member of the International Federation of Journalists and the Albanian-American Academy of Arts and Sciences.

Sulkuqi is married with children; she also plays piano.

== Selected works ==
- Po plas (I'm fed up) (2009)
- POEZIA, ‘HARAÇI’ TJETËR PËR KOHËRAT (2010)
- Kujto poetin!: 1945-2010 : album poetik në kujtim të 40 poetëve që nuk jetojnë më, ndër të cilët pesë të ekzekutuar nga diktatura (with Kolec Traboini) (2011)

== Awards ==
Sulkuqi has received several awards including;

- First Prize for Love, in Balkan Poetic Days (2002)
- Special prize at the Balkan meeting "Days of Asdren" - Skopje (2005)
- First Prize - Branch of the League of Writers (2005)
- The Migjen Award - Michigan, U.S. (2007)
- Ali Asllani Award - the Albanian Embassy in Athens and the Club of Albanian Writers, for the poetic volume Poezi.
- The Golden Pen Award - awarded by the League of Albanian-American Writers

In 2011 Sulkuqi was awarded the title of "Outstanding Artist of the City" by the city of Elbasan; she was also named as 'Ambassador of Peace' by the World Federation for Peace (October 2011).
