= Migjeni =

Albanian poet and writer (1911–1938)

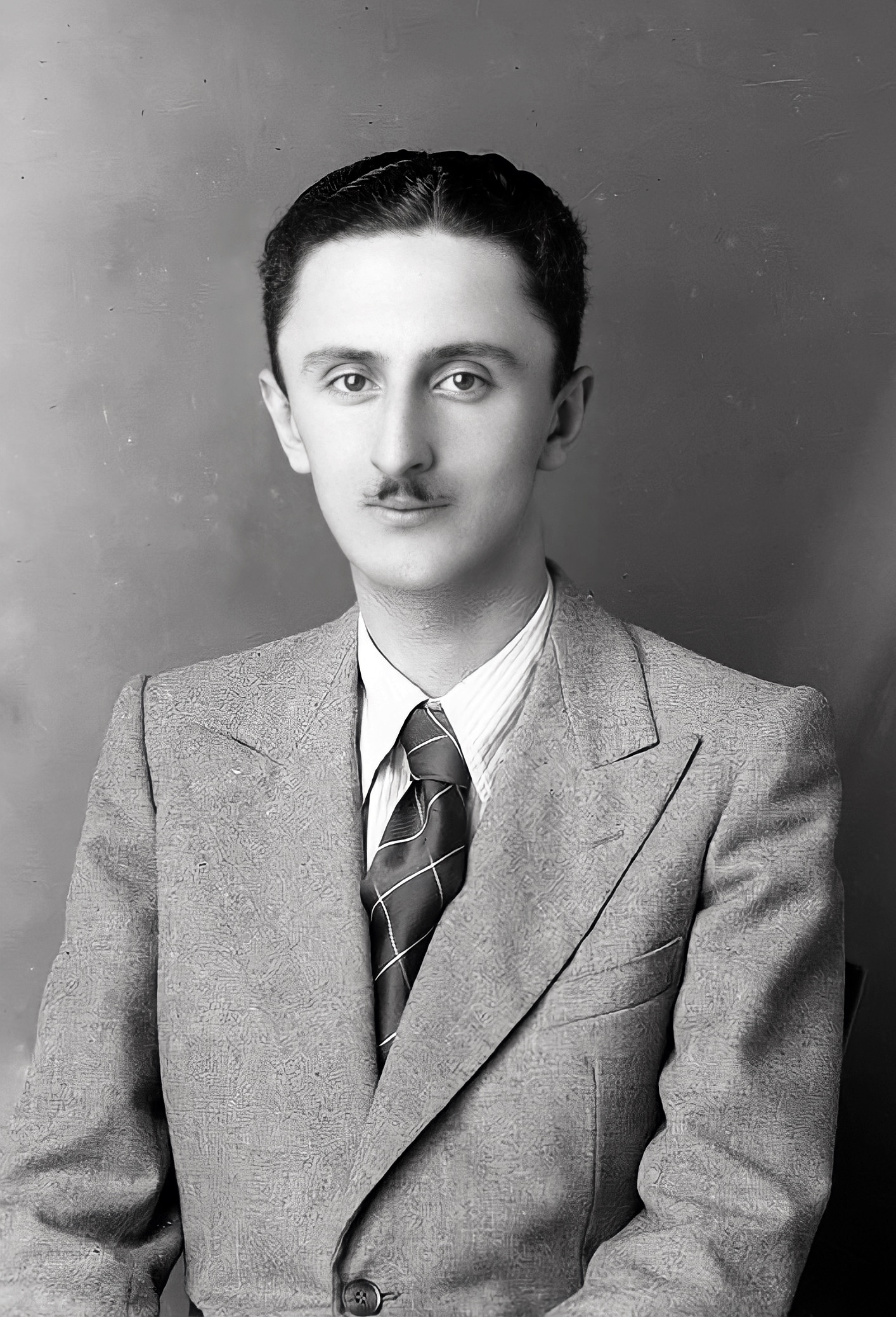
- Portrait of Migjeni, photographed by Geg Marubi
- Born: Millosh Gjergj Nikolla; 13 October 1911; Shkodër, Ottoman Empire (modern Albania)
- Died: 26 August 1938 (aged 26); Torre Pellice, Italy
- Occupations: Poet; translator; writer
- Writing career
- Pen name: Migjeni
- Language: Albanian; French; Greek; Latin; Russian; Serbo-Croatian
- Genre: Realism
- Notable awards: People's Teacher

Millosh Gjergj Nikolla (Albanian pronunciation: [miˈɫoʃ ɟɛˈrɟ niˈkoɫa]; 13 October 1911 – 26 August 1938), commonly known by the acronym pen name Migjeni, was an Albanian poet and writer, considered one of the most important of the 20th century. After his death, he was recognized as one of the main influential writers of interwar Albanian literature.

Migjeni is considered to have shifted from revolutionary romanticism to critical realism during his lifetime. He wrote about the poverty of the years he lived in, with writings such as "Give Us This Day Our Daily Bread", "The Killing Beauty", "Forbidden Apple", "The Corn Legend", "Would You Like Some Charcoal?" etc., severely conveyed the indifference of the wealthy classes to the suffering of the people.

The proliferation of his creativity gained a special momentum after World War II, when the communist regime took over the full publication of works, which in the 1930s had been partially unpublished.

== Biography ==
Migjeni was born on 13 October 1911 in the town of Shkodër at the southeastern coast of Lake of Shkodër.

His surname derived from his grandfather Nikolla, who hailed from the region of Upper Reka from where he moved to Shkodër in the late 19th century where he practiced the trade of a bricklayer and later married Stake Milani from Kuči, Montenegro, with whom he had two sons: Gjergj (Migjeni's father) and Kristo. His grandfather was one of the signatories of the congress for the establishment of the Albanian Orthodox Church in 1922. His mother Sofia Kokoshi (d. 1916), a native of Kavajë, was educated at the Catholic seminary of Scutari, run by Italian nuns. His maternal uncle Jovan Kokoshi taught at the Orthodox seminary in Bitola. Milosh had a brother that died in infancy, and four sisters: Lenka, Jovanka, Cvetka and Olga.

Some scholars think that Migjeni had Serb origin further speculating that his first language was Serbo-Croatian. Migjeni's cousin Angjelina Ceka Luarasi stated in her book Migjeni–Vepra that Migjeni was of Albanian and not of any Slavic origin and Migjeni spoke only Albanian as his mother tongue and later learned to speak a Slavic language while growing up. She states that the family is descended from the Nikolla family from Debar in the Upper Reka region and the Kokoshi family. Angjelina maintained that the family used many Slavic names because of their Orthodox faith.

He attended an Orthodox elementary school in Scutari. From 1923 to 1925, he attended a secondary school in Bar, Montenegro (in former Yugoslavia), where his sister Lenka had moved. At 14 years of age, in autumn 1925, he received a scholarship to attend secondary school in Monastir (Bitola) (also in former Yugoslavia), from where he graduated in 1927, then entered the Orthodox seminary of St. John the Theologian. He studied Old Church Slavonic, Russian, Greek, Latin and French. He continued his training and studies until June 1932.

His name was written Milosh Nikoliç in the passport dated 17 June 1932, then changed into Millosh Nikolla in the decree of appointment as teacher signed by Minister of Education Mirash Ivanaj dated 18 May 1933. In the revised birth certificate dated to 26 January 1937, his name is spelt Millosh Nikolla.

== Career ==
=== Teaching, publishing and deteriorating health ===
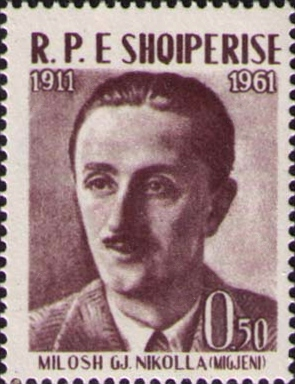
Migjeni on an Albanian stamp from 1961.

On 23 April 1933, he was appointed teacher at a school in the village of Vrakë or Vraka, seven kilometers from Shkokër, until 1934 when the school closed. It was during this period that he also began writing prose sketches and verses.

In May 1934, his first short prose piece, Sokrat i vuejtun apo derr i kënaqun (Suffering Socrates or a satisfied pig), was published in the periodical Illyria, under his new pen name Migjeni, an acronym of Millosh Gjergj Nikolla. In the summer of 1935, Migjeni fell seriously ill with tuberculosis, which he had contracted earlier. He journeyed to Athens, Greece in July of that year in hope of obtaining treatment for the disease which was endemic on the marshy coastal plains of Albania at the time but returned to Shkodra a month later with no improvement in his condition. In the autumn of 1935, he transferred for a year to a school in Shkodra itself and, again in the periodical Illyria, began publishing his first epoch-making poems.

In a letter of 12 January 1936 written to translator Skënder Luarasi (1900–1982) in Tirana, Migjeni announced, "I am about to send my songs to press. Since, while you were here, you promised that you would take charge of speaking to some publisher, 'Gutemberg' for instance, I would now like to remind you of this promise, informing you that I am ready." Migjeni later received the transfer he had earlier requested to the mountain village of Puka and in April 1936 began his activities as the headmaster of the run-down school there.

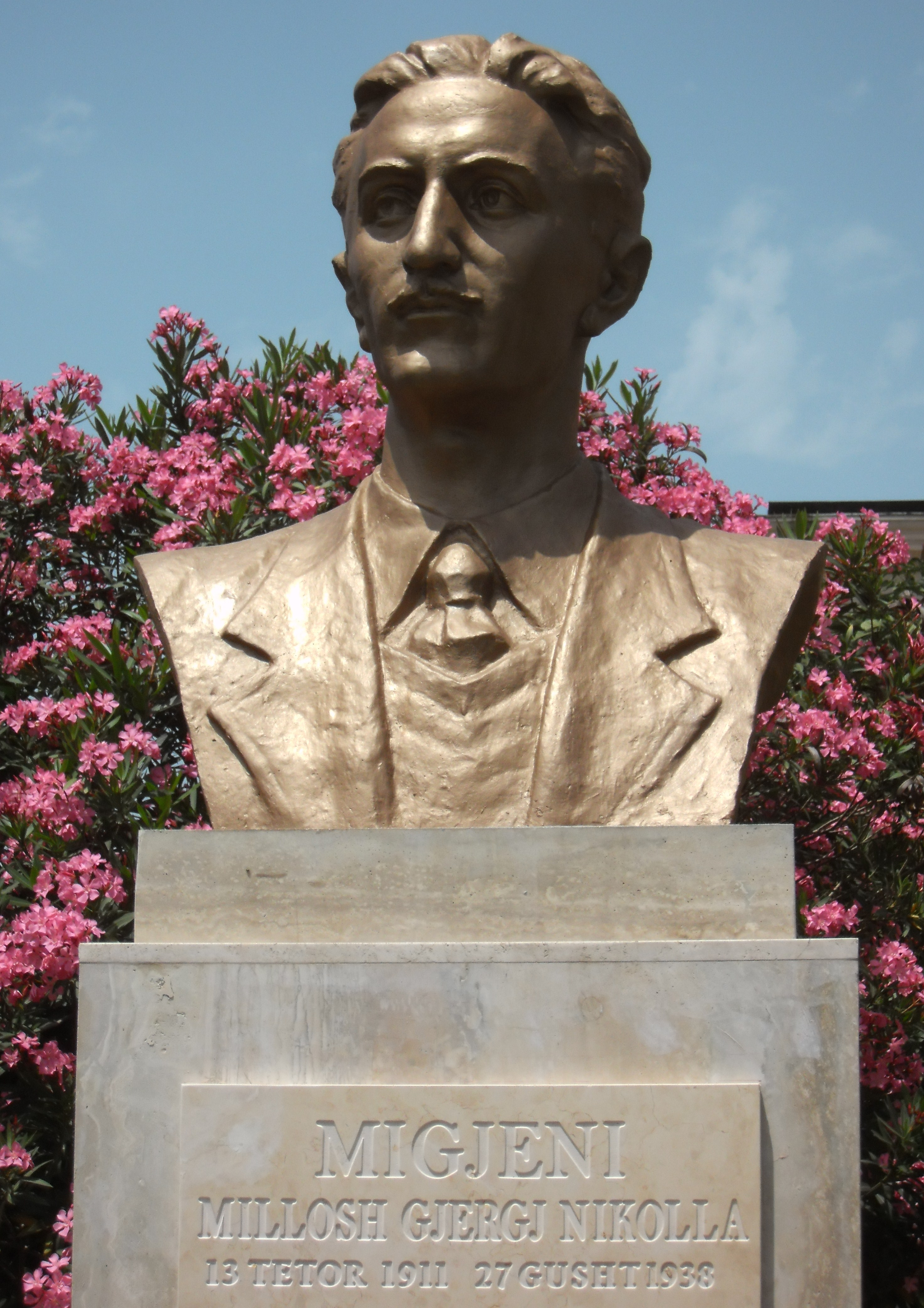
A bust of Migjeni in front of the Migjeni Theatre in Shkodër.

The clear mountain air did him some good, but the poverty and misery of the mountain people in and around Puka were even more overwhelming than that which he had experienced among the inhabitants of the coastal plain. Many of the children came to school barefoot and hungry, and teaching was interrupted for long periods because of outbreaks of contagious diseases, such as measles and mumps. After eighteen difficult months in the mountains, he was obliged to put an end to his career in order to seek medical treatment in Turin in Northern Italy where his sister Ollga was studying mathematics. He arrived in Turin before Christmas Day where he hoped, after recovery, to register and study at the Faculty of Arts. The breakthrough in the treatment of tuberculosis, however, would come a decade later. After five months at San Luigi Sanatorium near Turin, Migjeni was transferred to the Waldensian hospital in Torre Pellice where he died on 26 August 1938. Robert Elsie writes that "his demise at the age of twenty-six was a tragic loss for the modern Albanian letters".

The author had chosen the nom-de-plume Mi-Gje-Ni, an acronym formed by the first two letters each of his first name, patronymic and last name.

=== Poetry ===
Migjeni made his debut as a prose writer, authoring about twenty-four short prose sketches which he published in periodicals mainly between 1933 and 1938. It was Migjeni's poetry however that left a mark in Albanian culture and literature. His slender volume of verse (thirty-five poems) entitled Vargjet e Lira ("Free Verse") was printed by Gutenberg Press Publisher in Tirana in 1936, but was banned by government censorship. The second edition, published in 1944, was missing two old poems Parathanja e parathanjeve ("Preface of prefaces") and Blasfemi ("Blasphemy") that were deemed offensive, but it did include eight new ones. The main theme of Migjeni was misery and suffering, a reflection of the life he saw and lived which was evident in Free verse.

Resignation

We show our consolation only in tears...
Our inheritance from all these years
is misery... because within the womb
of the Universe our world is a tomb,
where mankind are condemned to sneak like snakes,
and their will as if squeezed in the fist of a giant breaks.
- One eye glittering with distilled drops of the deepest pain
glimmers from far across the vale of tears,
and sometimes an instinctive pulse of frustrated thought
flashes out across the spheres
seeking an outlet for anger overwrought.
But the head sags, and the sorrowing eye is hid,
and a solitary tear squeezes through the lid,
rolls down and off the face, a single drop of rain;
and from the tiny raindrop of that tear, a man is born again.
And each such man must take his fate in his own hands,
hoping for the smallest victory, and seek out distant lands;
where all the roads are laid with thorns and on every side walled in
by gravestones all besmeared with tears and lunatics who, silent, grin.

— (trans. Wilton)

According to Elsie, Migjeni's poetry was "of acute social awareness and despair. Previous generations of poets had sung the beauties of the Albanian mountains and the sacred traditions of the nation, whereas Migjeni now opened his eyes to the harsh realities of life, to the appalling level of misery, disease, and poverty he discovered all around him." He was a poet of despair who saw no way out, who cherished no hope that anything but death could put an end to suffering. "I suffer from the child whose father cannot buy him a toy. I suffer from a young man who burns with unslaked sexual desire. I suffer from the middle-aged man drowning in the apathy of life. I suffer from the old man who trembles at the prospect of death. I suffer from the peasant struggling with the soil. I suffer from the worker crushed by iron. I suffer from the sick suffering from all the diseases of the world... I suffer with man." Typical of the suffering and of the futility of human endeavor for Migjeni is Rezignata ("Resignation"), a poem in the longest cycle of the collection, Kangët e mjerimit ("Songs of poverty"). In it, he paints a grim portrait of earthly existence: somber nights, tears, smoke, thorns and mud. Rarely does a breath of fresh air or a vision of nature seep through the gloom. When nature does occur in the verse of Migjeni, then, it is autumn.

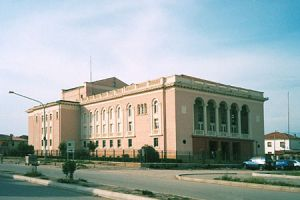
The Migjeni Theatre in Shkodër.

Some poems, such as Të birtë e shekullit të ri ("The sons of the new age"), Zgjimi ("Awakening"), Kanga e rinis ("Song of youth") and Kanga e të burgosunit ("The prisoner's song"), are assertively declamatory in a left-wing revolutionary manner. In those works, Migjeni gives readers a precursor of socialist verse or rather, in fact, as the zenith of genuine socialist verse in Albanian letters, long before the so-called liberation and socialist period from 1944 to 1990. Migjeni was, nonetheless, not a socialist or revolutionary poet in the political sense, despite the indignation and the occasional clenched fist he shows us. For this, he lacked the optimism as well as any sense of political commitment and activity.

He was a product of the 1930s, an age in which Albanian intellectuals, including Migjeni, were particularly fascinated by the West and in which, in Western Europe itself, the rival ideologies of communism and fascism were colliding for the first time in the Spanish Civil War. Migjeni was not entirely uninfluenced by the nascent philosophy of the right either. In Të lindet njeriu ("May the man be born") and particularly, in the Nietzschean dithyramb Trajtat e Mbinjeriut ("The shape of the Superman"), a strangled, crushed will transforms itself into "ardent desire for a new genius," for the Superman to come. To a Trotskyist friend, André Stefi, who had warned him that the communists would not forgive for such poems, Migjeni replied, "My work has a combative character, but for practical reasons, and taking into account our particular conditions, I must maneuver in disguise. I cannot explain these things to the [communist] groups, they must understand them for themselves. The publication of my works is dictated by the necessities of the social situation through which we are passing. As for myself, I consider my work to be a contribution to the union of the groups. André, my work will be achieved if I manage to live a little longer."

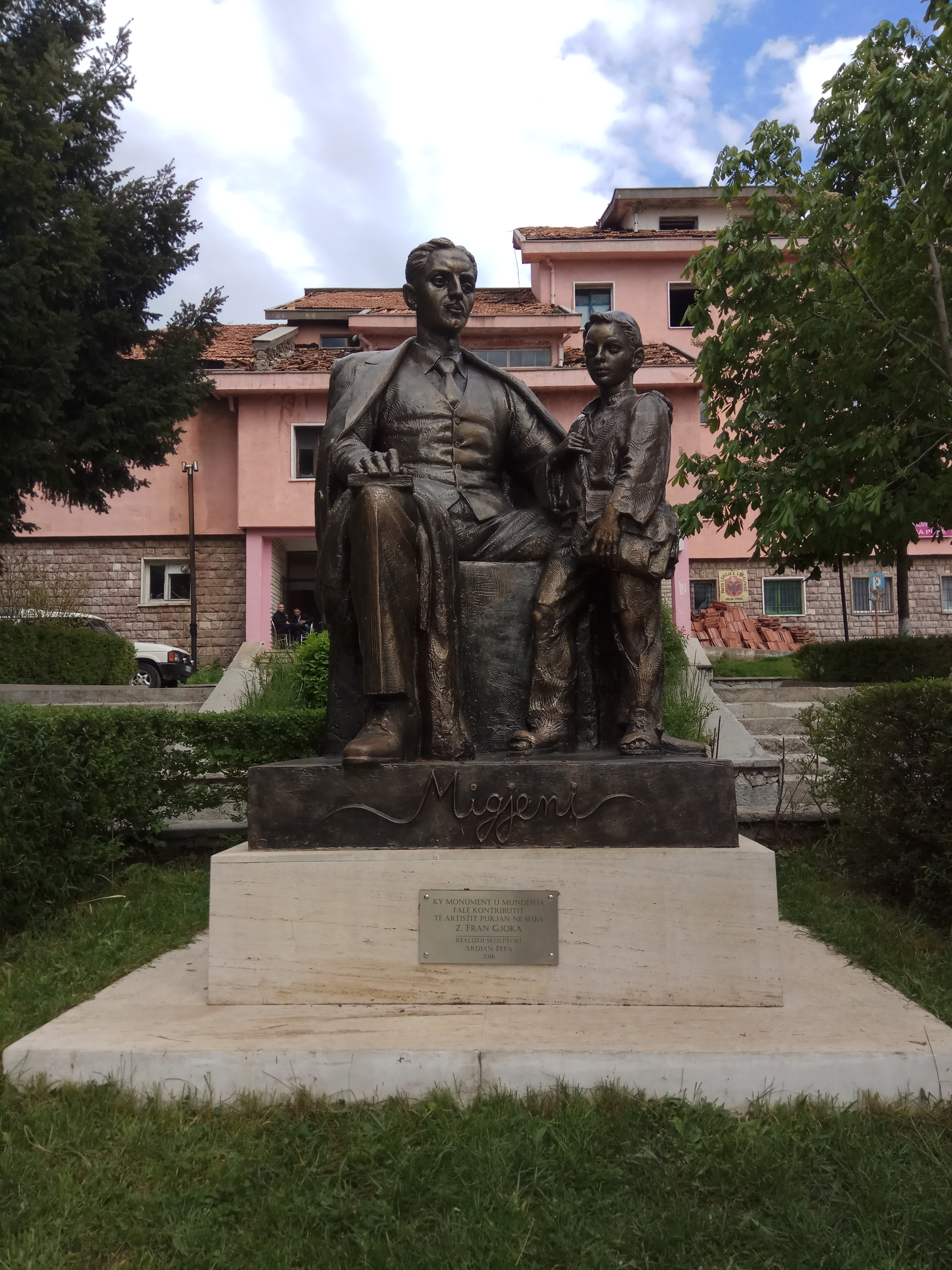
A monument of Migjeni in Pukë.

Part of the 'establishment' which he felt was oblivious to the sufferings of humanity was the Church. Migjeni's religious education and his training for the Orthodox priesthood seem to have been entirely counterproductive, for he cherished neither an attachment to religion nor any particularly fond sentiments for the organized Church. God for Migjeni was a giant with granite fists crushing the will of man. Evidence of the repulsion he felt towards God and the Church are to be found in the two poems missing from the 1944 edition, Parathania e parathanieve ("Preface of prefaces") with its cry of desperation "God! Where are you?", and Blasfemi ("Blasphemy").

In Kanga skandaloze ("Scandalous song"), Migjeni expresses a morbid attraction to a pale nun and at the same time his defiance and rejection of her world. This poem is one which helps throw some light not only on Migjeni's attitude to religion but also on one of the least studied aspects in the life of the poet, his repressed sexuality.

Eroticism has certainly never been a prominent feature of Albanian literature at any period and one would be hard-pressed to name any Albanian author who has expressed his intimate impulses and desires in verse or prose. Migjenis verse and his prose abound with the figures of women, many of them unhappy prostitutes, for whom Migjeni betrays both pity and open sexual interest. It is the tearful eyes and the red lips which catch his attention; the rest of the body is rarely described. Passion and rapturous desire are ubiquitous in his verse, but equally present is the specter of physical intimacy portrayed in terms of disgust and sorrow. It is but one of the many bestial faces of misery described in the 105-line Poema e mjerimit ("The poem of the misery").

== Legacy ==
Regarding his legacy, Elsie writes: "Though Migjeni did not publish a single book during his lifetime, his works, which circulated privately and in the press of the period, were an immediate success. Migjeni paved the way for modern literature in Albania." This literature was, however, soon to be nipped in the bud. The very year of the publication of Free Verse saw the victory of Stalinism in Albania and the proclamation of the People's Republic.

Many have speculated as to what contribution Migjeni might have made to Albanian letters had he managed to live longer. The question remains highly hypothetical, for this individualist voice of genuine social protest would no doubt have suffered the same fate as most Albanian writers of talent in the late 1940s, i.e. internment, imprisonment or execution. His early demise has at least preserved the writer for us undefiled.

The fact that Migjeni did perish so young makes it difficult to provide a critical assessment of his work. Though generally admired, Migjeni is not without critics. Some have been disappointed by his prose, nor is the range of his verse sufficient to allow us to acclaim him as a universal poet.

== See also ==
- List of Albanian writers
- Albanian literature

== Sources ==
- Elsie, Robert (2005). Albanian Literature: A Short History. I.B.Tauris. pp. 138–. ISBN 978-1-84511-031-4.
- Elsie, Robert (2012). A Biographical Dictionary of Albanian History. I.B.Tauris. pp. 308–309. ISBN 978-1-78076-431-3.
- Demo, Elsa (14 October 2011). "Migjeni në librin e shtëpisë". Mapo; Arkiva Lajmeve. Archived from the original on 18 April 2021.
- Pipa, Arshi (1978). Albanian literature: social perspectives. R. Trofenik. ISBN 978-3-87828-106-1.
- Polet, Jean-Claude (2002). Auteurs européens du premier XXe siècle: 1. De la drôle de paix à la drôle de guerre (1923-1939). De Boeck Supérieur. pp. 710–711. ISBN 978-2-8041-3580-5.
