= Zenel Bastari =

Albanian poet (c. 1767 – c. 1837)

Zenel Bastari or Zenel Hyka (c. 1767 – c. 1837) was an Albanian poet of the Bejtexhinj literary movement. A native of Tirana, he lived and worked from the end of 18th century until mid 19th century. Together with Hasan Zyko Kamberi and Nezim Frakulla he was part of the Bejtexhinj who focused on social and political criticism rather than Islamic moral and life. A precursor of the bourgeois critical-realism, he is also considered one of the first anti-feudal writers in Albania.

== Life ==
Zenel was born in Tirana, back then Sanjak of Scutari of Ottoman Empire, in late 18th century, and is mentioned to have lived in the era of Ali Pasha Tepelena. It is believed that the year of birth is 1765–70. He was the son of Ramë Hyka, a villager from nearby Bastar who had settled in Tirana (thus the family name Bastari) and a local woman. He had a brother named Rexhep. Zenel took his first lessons in the mejtep (religious school) in Tirana. He later entered the Madrasa of Tirana. Meanwhile, he worked as an assistant in a local esnaf shop dealing with silk and embroidering, therefore he mastered that profession (Albanian: gajtanxhi). After finishing the madrasa, he worked as a hodja for the rest of his life. There is no information on his religious teachers or people who influenced him, but from his work is derived that he was very well prepared in Islamic Mysticism and he was a follower of the Bektashi order of Sufism. Year of death is accepted to be between 1835 and 1840. He mentions in his poetry Baba Shemin, an actual public and Bektashi religious figure from Fushe-Kruje who died in 1831.

== Work ==
=== Studies on his work ===
As no original written collection has survived all the poems have reached today as oral tradition or scattered in pieces in mosques and tekkes. His work, collected in a diwan was presented only in the 1930s. The first to draw interest on his work was Ibrahim Hasanaj, who collected the poems from Hafiz Ibrahim Dalliu, Rexhep Nizami, Ali Bixhiu and Hamid Ohri, and in 1959 sent to the Literature-Linguists Catedre of the University of Tirana all the written materials he found on Bastari. The bejtes of Bastari spread a lot and got popularity due to their strong social-political messages. Albanian scholar Jorgo Bulo states that "If [Bastari's work] came in oral tradition to date, this shows its vitality". The researcher Arif Gjyli used Hasanaj's findings to come up with a long critical study and interpretation of Bastari's work in 1961. It was published in the Bulletini për Shkencat Shoqërore (Bulletin for Social Studies) of the Tirana University. Another study, based on Gjyli's work, came from Mahmut Hysa, published in the Gjurmime Albanologjike (Albanological Reconnaissance) magazine of the Albanological Institute of Pristina in 1988. Meanwhile, Hasanaj continued the task of collecting Bastari's poems until 1970, and added 145 odes, finally bringing the diwan to the structural and content level as known today. The full diwan was published only in 2003 with the support of the Bektashi community of Albania, and its leader Haxhi Dede Reshat Bardhi.

Bastari wrote ghazals, qasidas, and odes. He used many Oriental words like all the Albanian writers of that era, but applied carefully all poetical rules of that time, and enriched the language with "mystical" terminology thus differing from the everyday language.

=== Social context ===
As a precursor of the Albanian Rilindja literature, Bastari's work is also specifically important because it went past the usual mystical-philosophical and religious context of the Oriental-style poetry of the time. It brought strong social notes which cannot be found to this extent in other works of contemporary poets.

Bastari showed criticism, rage, and contempt towards the religious administration, feudal rules, landowners, hodjas, pashas, judicial system personnel (kadis) for their corruption, abuse of power, and their indifference and maltreatment on the masses. Bastari lived in Tirana in a period of violent social injustices, which were quite common in the Ottoman Empire of that time and especially in Ottoman Albania. Worried about the fate of simple people, and educated with the notion of justice, he couldn't help but to raise his voice against those negative social phenomena and all those whom he considered responsible.

In many of his poems, it is noted that he used pejorative and critical tones. He found inspiration in the honest events and personages, both historical or national, local beys, but also people of low-morality, liars, and at a point, he becomes part of the antagonisms and clashes through his verses. The poet was a family friend and sided with the Jallaj family (locals of Tirana) during their conflict with the powerful Toptani family. In two of his poems dedicated to Hysen Aga Jella and Ahmed Bey Qorri, he uses polemical and strong satirical notes. This is also present in the poem dedicated to Baba Shemin, a well-known clergyman who initiated Ali Pasha Tepelena as a Bektashi, murdered by orders of Kapllan Pasha Toptani - nothing more than a local expression of the Ottoman rule arrogance. This affiliation gives his work a soundful social content, as a reflection of the transitional period of a society in strong moral crisis, where decent castes find themselves insecure and threatened.

== Legacy ==
A street in Tirana is named after him.

== See also ==
- Haxhi Ymer Kashari
- Diwan poetry

== Bibliography ==
- Zenel Bastari dhe vepra e tij (Zenel Bastari and his work), Ibrahim Hasanaj ed., Tirana: Argeta LMG, 2003.
