= Frashëri =

Origin
- Meaning: Albanian frashër "ash-tree", from Latin fraxinus.
- Region of origin: Frashër, south Albania

Frashëri is an Albanian surname.

== People ==
- Abdyl Frashëri (1839–1892), Albanian founder
- Dalip Frashëri, 19th-century poet
- Erlis Frashëri (born 1988), Albanian footballer
- Eshref Frashëri (1874–1938), Albanian politician
- Fatmir Frashëri (1941–2019), Albanian football player
- Gjergj Adhamidhi bej Frashëri (Gjergj Adhamidhi; 1859–1939), Albanian politician
- Hektor Frashëri (1929–1999), Albanian politician
- Kristo Frashëri (1920–2016), Albanian historian and participant in the Albanian National Liberation War
- Mehdi Frashëri (1872–1963), Albanian politician
- Midhat Frashëri (1880–1949), Albanian politician
- Naim Frashëri (1846–1900), Albanian poet, writer and activist
- Naim Frashëri (actor) (1923–1975), Albanian actor
- Sami Frashëri (1850–1904), Albanian founder
- Shahin Frashëri, 19th-century poet
- Stivi Frashëri (born 1990), Albanian footballer
- Xhanfize Frashëri (1912–1971), Albanian physician
