= Baba Shemimi =

Albanian bejtexhi and saint (died 1831)

Baba Shemimi (died 1831), also known as Kemaledin Shemimi Ibrahim, Baba Shemim, Baba Shemimi of Fushë-Krujë or Baba Shemimi of Krujë, was an Albanian Bektashi bejtexhi and martyr.

Originally a Sunni Muslim hodja and müderris (religious teacher), Baba Shemimi encountered the Bektashi Sufi doctrine at the Köprülü tekke (now Veles, North Macedonia) alongside his friend Hatemi Haidar Baba. Upon his return, he established the tekke of Fushë-Krujë.

Baba Shemimi was closely associated with Ali Pasha Tepelena, Vizier of the Janina Vilayet of the Ottoman Empire, and was responsible for Ali Pasha's initiation into the Bektashi order. With Ali Pasha's support, he established additional tekkes in Melçan, Xhefaji Baba tekke in Elbasan, and Sadik Baba Tekke in Koshtan (near Memaliaj). Described as highly mystical, Baba Shemimi was also a Sufi poet whose works often critiqued public figures and social injustices of his time.

During his lifetime, Baba Shemimi was the most renowned Bektashi leader in Albania. The Dollma Tekke of Krujë, where he resided, contained 360 holy tombs and was known as "the small Khorasan."

Baba Shemimi was assassinated by Kapllan Pasha Toptani's men, from the powerful Toptani family, in 1831. An elegy written by the bejte period poet Zenel Bastari commemorates his death. According to a letter discovered in the Basri Baba library in Istanbul, Baba Shemimi was killed by two bullets to the chest while reading holy books. He was buried in his tekke.

== See also ==
- Nasibi Tahir Babai
- Haxhi Ymer Kashari
- Religion in Albania
