= Fraşerli =

Fraşerli may refer to:

- Fraşerli Naim, or Naim Frashëri, Albanian poet and revivalist
- Fraşerli Şemsettin Sami, or Sami Frashëri, Albanian writer, philosopher, playwright and revivalist
- Fraşerli Gani Bey
- Fraşerli Mehdî

== See also ==
- Frashëri
