= Haxhi Ymer Kuttab =

Cultural heritage monument of Kosovo

- Mejtepi i Haxhi Ymerit (Albanian)
- Interactive map of Haxhi Ymer Kuttab
- Location: Gjakova, Kosovo

History
- Built: 18th century

The Haxhi Ymer Kuttab is a cultural heritage monument in Gjakova, Kosovo.

== History ==
The Haxhi Ymer Kuttab (Albanian: mejtep) is located opposite the entrance to Haxhi Ymer Mosque in the eponymous complex and neighborhood. Mainly dedicated to Muslim religious education, it also housed a printing press and secondary school classes in the 1990s.

The mejtep is a two-story stone and adobe building marred over the years by restoration issues such as widened windows for floor light. The southern part opens, via a deteriorating entryway topped by 7 windows and measuring 60 centimetres (24 in), onto the mosque. Both parts of the complex are surrounded by a long awning of 1.3 metres (4.3 ft), a relatively new feature in the formerly open-air structure. The mezzanine is wooden with boarded floors and ceiling decoration. The western veranda on the street has also seen better days. Except for the ground floor skylights due for later, the structure was restored faithfully in 2014.
