= Sulejman Naibi =

Albanian poet

Sulejman Naibi (Ramazani) was an Albanian early period poet of the bejtexhinj era.

== Life ==
Not much is known from his life. He was a contemporary and arguably less-important to the other bejtexhi Nezim Frakulla. Naibi was born in Berat, Sanjak of Berat, and part of the Janina Vilayet of the Ottoman Empire. Naibi lived most of his life in Berat and died there in 1771 or 1772. He was a bektashi.

== Poetry ==
Some of his works were written in Elbasan, presumably he was married there.
Naibi's language is purer and with less loaned Oriental words. His verse is influenced a lot from the Arabic tradition. He probably lived in Turkey or Middle East for some time.
Sulejman Naibi is the author of a diwan of poetry in Albanian, a manuscript of which survived in Fier until 1944, but was then lost. Only a few of his poems have surfaced in other manuscripts or have survived orally in central Albanian folk songs, such as Mahmudeja e stolisurë (Mahmude, Well-Adorned One), which the Albanian critic Koço Bihiku calls "the Dandy burning with Love". Among the little of this eight and twelve-syllable verse which has been published, we find delicate lyrics of a certain metrical precision. Naibi is the first Muslim poet to devote verse to the beauty of women, most other poetry in the Oriental tradition being composed by men to the beauty of young men.

== See also ==
- Nezim Frakulla
- Hasan Zyko Kamberi
- Ottoman Albania
