= Muci =

Muci may refer to:

== People ==
- Claretta Muci (born 1958), Italian journalist
- Cosimo Muci (1920–1992), Italian football player
- Ernest Muçi (born 2001), Albanian football player
- Mariana Muci (born 1988), Venezuelan tennis player
- Muci Nano (born 1960) is an Albanian political analyst
- Muçi Zade, Albanian author
- Nikolas Muci (born 2003), Swiss football player

== Places ==
- Muci or Muć, Croatia
