= Albanian literature =

Albanian literature (Albanian: Letërsia shqipe) stretches back to the Middle Ages and comprises those literary texts and works written in Albanian. It may also refer to literature written by Albanians in Albania, Kosovo and the Albanian diaspora particularly in Italy. Albanian occupies an independent branch within the Indo-European family and does not have any other closely related language. The origin of Albanian is not entirely known, but it may be a successor of the ancient Illyrian language.

The Archbishop of Antivari Guillaume Adam wrote a report in 1332 in which he said that Albanians used Latin letters in their books although their language was quite different from the Latin language.

The oldest surviving documents written in Albanian are the "Formula e pagëzimit" (Baptismal formula) recorded by Pal Engjëlli, Bishop of Durrës in 1462 in the Gheg dialect, and some New Testament verses from that period.

== Medieval period ==
=== 15th century ===
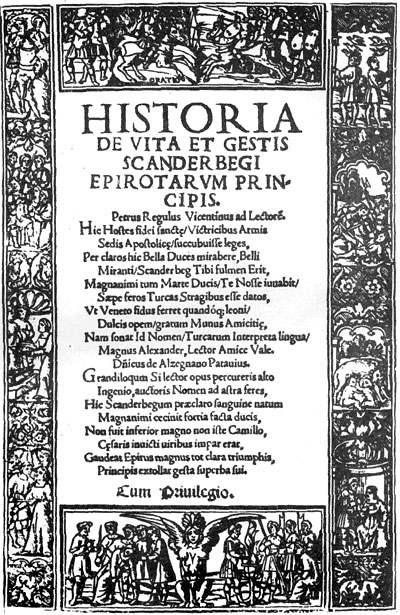
Frontispiece of Historia de vita et gestis Scanderbegi, Epirotarum principis by Marin Barleti.

The expansion of the Ottoman Empire pushed many Albanians from their homeland during the period of the Western European Renaissance humanism. Among the Albanian émigrés that became known in the humanist world are historian Marin Barleti (1460–1513) who in 1510 published in Rome a history of Skanderbeg, which was translated into many other European languages, or Marino Becichemi (1468–1526), Gjon Gazulli (1400–1455), Leonicus Thomeus (1456–1531), Michele Maruli (15th century), Michele Artioti (1480–1556) and many others who were distinguished in various fields of science, art and philosophy.

=== 16th century ===
The cultural resistance was first of all expressed through the elaboration of Albanian in the area of church sacrifices and publications, mainly of the Catholic confessional region in the North, but also of the Orthodox in the South. The Protestant reforms invigorated hopes for the development of the local language and literary tradition when cleric Gjon Buzuku translated the Catholic liturgy into Albanian, trying to do for Albanian what Luther did for German.

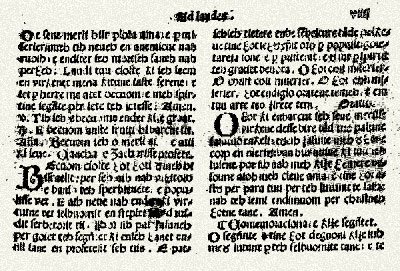
Excerpt from Meshari by Gjon Buzuku.

Meshari (The Missal) by Gjon Buzuku, published by him in 1555, is the first literary work published in Albanian. The refined level of the language and the stabilised orthography must be a result of an earlier tradition of writing Albanian, a tradition that is not known. But there is some fragmented evidence, dating earlier than Buzuku, which indicates that Albanian was written at least since the 14th century AD. The first known evidence dates from 1332 AD and deals with the French Dominican Guillelmus Adae, Archbishop of Antivari, who in a report in Latin writes that Albanians use Latin letters in their books although their language is quite different from Latin. Of special importance in supporting this are: a baptizing formula (Unte paghesont premenit Atit et Birit et spertit senit) of 1462, written in Albanian within a text in Latin by the bishop of Durrës, Pal Engjëlli; a glossary with Albanian words of 1497 by Arnold von Harff, a German who had travelled through Albania, and a 15th-century fragment from the Bible from the Gospel of Matthew, also in Albanian, but in Greek letters.

Albanian writings of these centuries must not have been religious texts only, but historical chronicles too. They are mentioned by the humanist Marin Barleti, who, in his book The Siege of Shkodra (De Obsidione Scodrensi) (1504), confirms that he leafed through such chronicles written in the language of the people (in vernacula lingua). Despite the obstacles generated by the Counter-Reformation which was opposed to the development of national languages in Christian liturgy, this process went on uninterrupted. During the 16th to 17th centuries, the catechism E mbësuame krishterë (Christian Teachings) (1592) by Lekë Matrënga, Doktrina e krishterë (The Christian Doctrine) (1618) and Rituale romanum (1621) by Pjetër Budi, the first writer of original Albanian prose and poetry, an apology for George Castriot (1636) by Frang Bardhi, who also published a dictionary and folklore creations, the theological-philosophical treaty Cuneus Prophetarum (The Band of Prophets) (1685) by Pjetër Bogdani, the most universal personality of Albanian Middle Ages, were published in Albanian.

Bogdani's work is a theological-philosophical treatise that considers with originality, by merging data from various sources, principal issues of theology, a full biblical history and the complicated problems of scholasticism, cosmogony, astronomy, pedagogy, etc. Bogdani brought into Albanian culture the humanist spirit and praised the role of knowledge and culture in the life of man; with his written work in a language of polished style, he marked a turning point in the history of Albanian literature.

Another important writer of the Early Albanian Literature was Jul Variboba.

=== 17th century ===
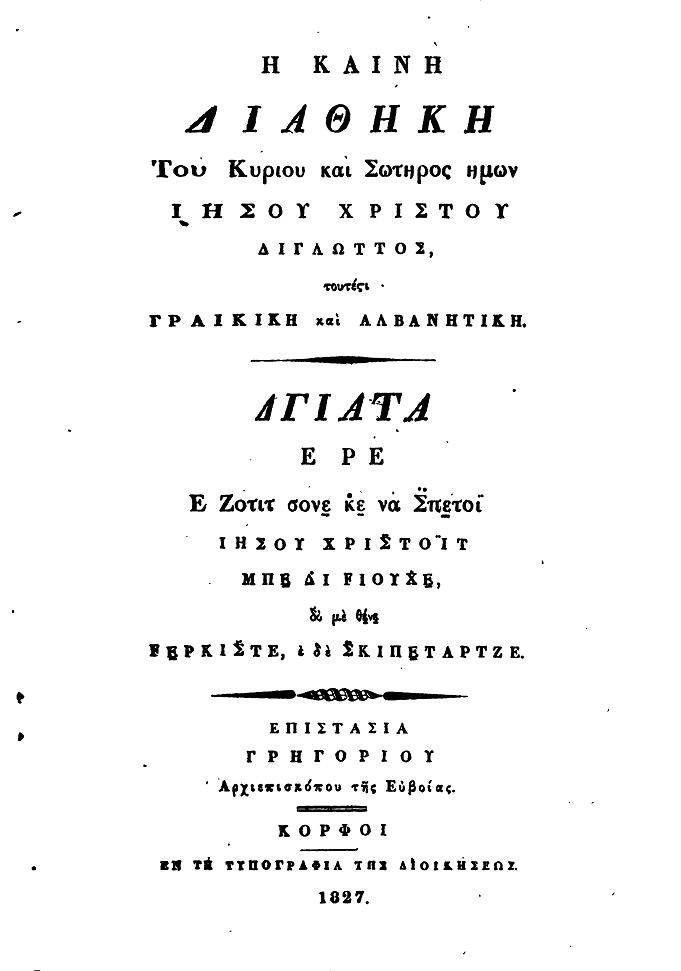
The New Testament, translated into Albanian, published using Greek characters, 1827.

During 17th and 18th centuries, the literature of Orthodox and Muslim confessional cultural circles witnessed a greater development. An anonymous writer from Elbasan translated into Albanian a number of sections from the Bible; T. H. Filipi, also from Elbasan, brings the Dhiata e Vjetër dhe e Re (The Old and the New Testament). These efforts multiplied in the following century with the publication in 1827 of the integral text of the Dhiata e Re (The New Testament) by G. Gjirokastriti and with the big corpus of (Christian) religious translations by Kostandin Kristoforidhi (1830–1895), in both main dialects of Albanian, publications which helped in the process of integrating the two dialects into a unified literary language and in setting up the basis for the establishment of the National Church of the Albanians with the liturgy in their own language.

Although in opposite direction with this tendency, the culture of Voskopoja is also to be mentioned, a culture that during the 17th century became a great hearth of civilization and a metropolis of the Balkan peninsula, with an Academy and a printing press and with personalities like T. Kavaljoti, Dh. Haxhiu, G. Voskopojari, whose works of knowledge, philology, theology and philosophy assisted objectively in the writing and recognition of Albanian. Although the literature that evolved in Voskopoja was mainly in Greek, the need to erect obstacles to Islamization made necessary the use of national languages, encouraging the development of national cultures. Walachian and Albanian were also used for the teaching of Greek in the schools of Voskopoja, and books in Walachian were also printed in its printing presses. The works of Voskopoja writers and savants have brought in some elements of the ideas of the European Enlightenment. The most distinguished of them was Teodor Kavaljoti. According to the notes of H.E. Thunman, the work of Kavaljoti, which remained unpublished, in most part deals with issues from almost all branches of philosophy. It shows the influence of Plato, Descartes, Malebranche and Leibniz.

== Early Modern period ==
One of the results of the influence of Islam and particularly Sufi orders, and the culture of the invader, was the emergence of a school of poetry known as the school of the bejtexhinj during the 18th century, or of a literature written in Albanian but by means of an Arabic alphabet. Its authors such as Nezim Frakulla, Sulejman Naibi, Hasan Zyko Kamberi, Shahin and Dalip Frashëri, and others dealt in their works with motifs borrowed from Oriental literature, wrote religious texts and poetry in a language suffocated by orientalisms and developed religious lyric and epic. The poetry of the bejtexhinj was strongly influenced by Turkish, Persian and Arabic literary models in fashion at the time both in Istanbul and the Middle east. Most of the genres and forms prevalent in Turkish and Persian verse are to be encountered in Albanian. There are either as isolated poems or within the divans: the murabba', quatrain; the ilahi, religious hymns; the qaside, the longer panegyric odes favoured by the Arabs; and the ghazal, shorter poems, often love lyrics which were favoured by the Turks and Persians. The subject matter was often religious, either meditatively intimate or openly didactic, serving to spread the faith. The speculative character of much of this verse derived its inspiration from the currents of Islam: from Sunnite spirituality to the intense mystical spheres of Shi'ite Sufism and later, to the more liberal, though equally mystical reflections of Bektashi pantheism. Secular verses occur as well: love lyrics, nature poetry and historical and philosophical verse.

The first major poet among the bejtexhinj was Nezim Frakulla (1680–1760) who wrote his first poetry in Turkish, Persian and Arabic including two divans. Between 1731 and 1735 he composed a divan and various other poetry in Albanian, as well as an Albanian- Turkish dictionary in verse form. His divan include verse ranging from panegyrics on local pashas and military campaigns, to odes on friends and patrons, poems on separation from and longing for his friends and lovers, description of nature in the springtime, religious verse, and in particular, love lyrics.

Another famous bejtexhinj is Hasan Zyko Kamberi who was one of the most commanding representatives of the Muslim tradition in Albanian literature, through his main work, a 200-page mexhmua (verse collection). Kamberi's secular verse covers a wide range of themes.

=== 19th century ===
The 19th century, the century of national movements in the Balkans, found Albanians without a sufficient tradition of a unitary development of the state, language and culture but, instead, with an individualistic and regionalist mentality inherited from the supremacy of clan and kinship and consequently with an underdeveloped national conscience, though with a spirit of spontaneous rebellion. In this historical cultural situation emerged and fully developed an organized ideological, military and literary movement, called Rilindja Kombëtare (National Renaissance). It was inspired by the ideas of National Romanticism and Enlightenment, which were cultivated among the circles of Albanian intelligentsia, mainly émigrés in the old settlements in Italy and the more recent ones in Istanbul, Bucharest, United States, Sofia and Cairo.

National Renaissance, nurturing the Albanian as a language of culture, the organization of national education and the establishment of a national literature on the cultural level as well as the creation of the independent state – these were the goals of this movement which gave birth to the school of Albanian Romanticism. It was imbued with the spirit of national liberation, with the nostalgia of the émigré and the rhetorical pathos of past heroic wars. This literary school developed the poetry most. Regarding the motifs and poetical forms, its hero was the ethical man, the fighting Albanian, and to a lesser degree the tragic man. It is closely linked with the folklore tradition.

The pursuit of this tradition and the publications of Rapsodi të një poeme arbëreshe (Rhapsody of an Arbëresh Poem) in 1866 by Jeronim De Rada, of Përmbledhje të këngëve popullore dhe rapsodi të poemave shqiptare (Collection of Albanian Folk Songs and Rhapsodies of Albanian Poems) in 1871 by Zef Jubani, Bleta shqiptare (Albanian Bee) in 1878 by Thimi Mitko, etc., were part of the cultural programme of the National Renaissance for establishing a compact ethnic and cultural identity of Albanians.

Romanticist poet Girolamo de Rada

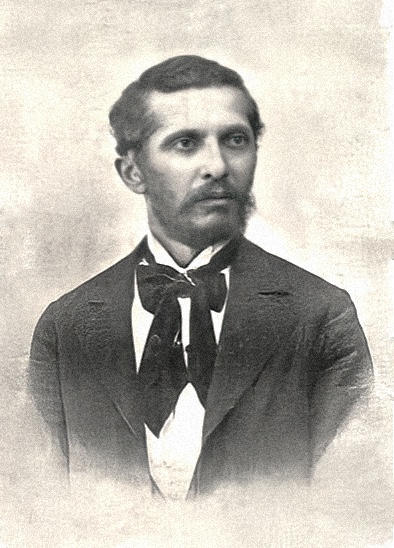
Pantheist and romanticist writer Naim Frashëri

Two are the greatest representatives of Albanian Romanticism of 19th century: Jeronim De Rada (1814–1903), and Naim Frashëri (1846–1900), born in Albania, educated at Zosimea of Ioannina, but emigrated and deceased in Istanbul. The first is the Albanian romantic poet brought up in the climate of European Romanticism, the second is the Albanian romanticist and pantheist who merges in his poetry the influence of Eastern poetry, especially Persian, with the spirit of the poetry of Western Romanticism.

De Rada wrote a cycle of epical-lyrical poems in the style of Albanian rhapsodies: Këngët e Milosaos (The Songs of Milosao), 1836, Serafina Topia 1839, Skënderbeu i pafat (Unlucky Skanderbeg) 1872–1874 etc. with the ambition of creating the national epos for the century of Skanderbeg. Following the traces of Johann Gottfried Herder, De Rada raised the love for folk songs in his poetry and painted it in ethnographic colours. His works reflect both Albanian life with its characteristic customs and mentalities, and the Albanian drama of the 15th century, when Albania came under Ottoman rule. The conflict between the happiness of the individual and the tragedy of the nation, the scenes by the riversides, women gathering wheat in the fields, the man going to war and the wife embroidering his belt, all represented with a delicate lyrical feeling.

Naim Frashëri wrote a pastoral poem Bagëti e bujqësia (Shepherds and Farmers) (1886), a collection of philosophical, patriotic and love lyrics Lulet e verës (Summer Flowers), (1890), an epical poem on Skanderbeg Histori e Skënderbeut (The History of Skanderbeg) (1898), a religious epical poem Qerbelaja (1898), two poems in Greek O Eros (i.e. O Love) and O alithis pothos ton skipetaron (i.e. The True Desire of Albanians), some lyrics in Persian Tehajylat (The Dream) and many erudite works in Albanian. He is recognised as the greatest national poet of Albanians. Frashëri established modern lyrics in Albanian poetry. In the spirit of Bucolics and Georgics of Virgil, in his Bagëti e bujqësia (Shepherds and Farmers) he sang to the works of the land tiller and shepherd by writing a hymn to the beauties of his fatherland and expressing the nostalgia of the émigré poet and the pride of being Albanian. The longing for his birthplace, the mountains and fields of Albania, the graves of his ancestors, the memories of his childhood, feed his inspiration with lyrical strength and impulse.

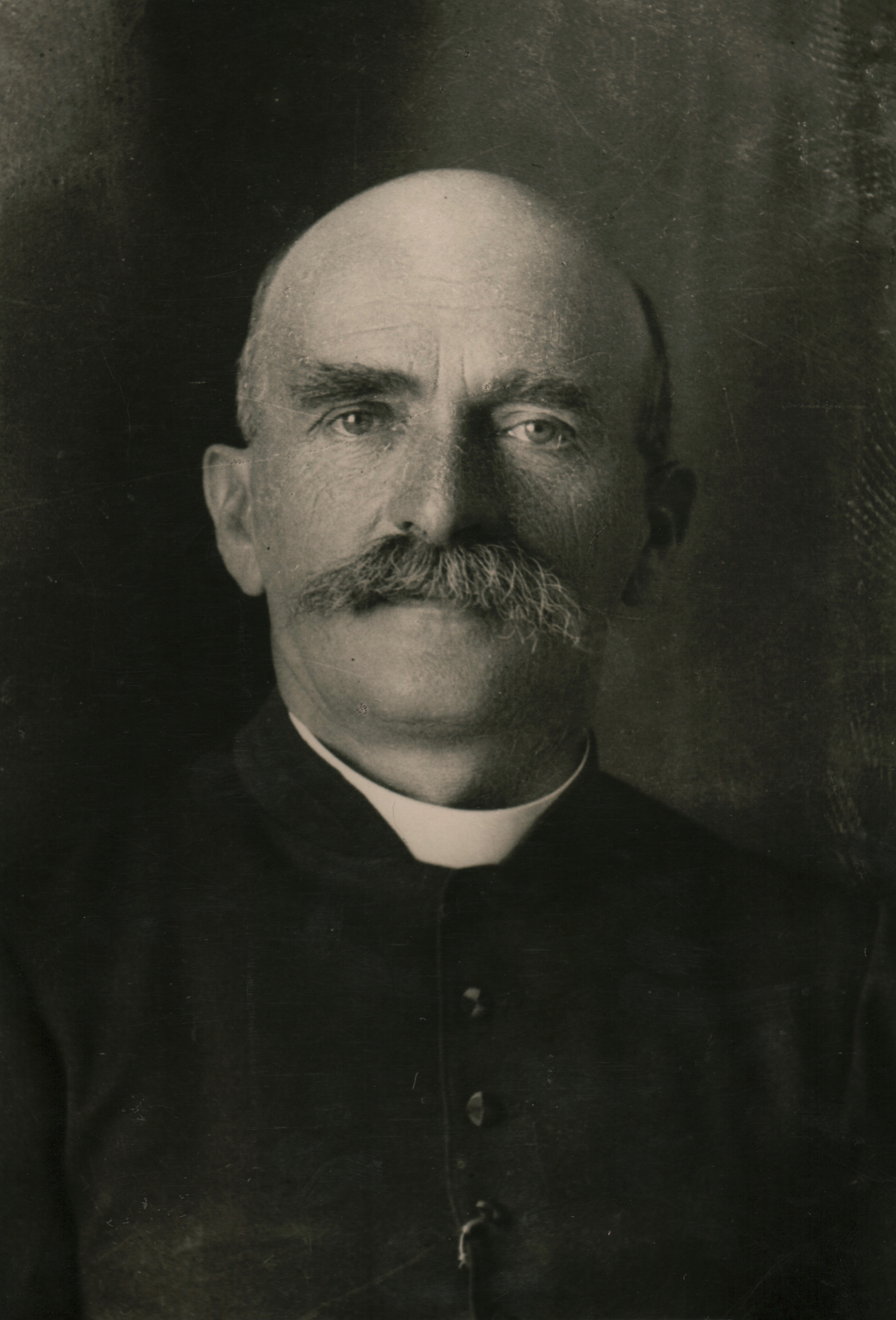
National romanticist poet Ndre Mjeda.

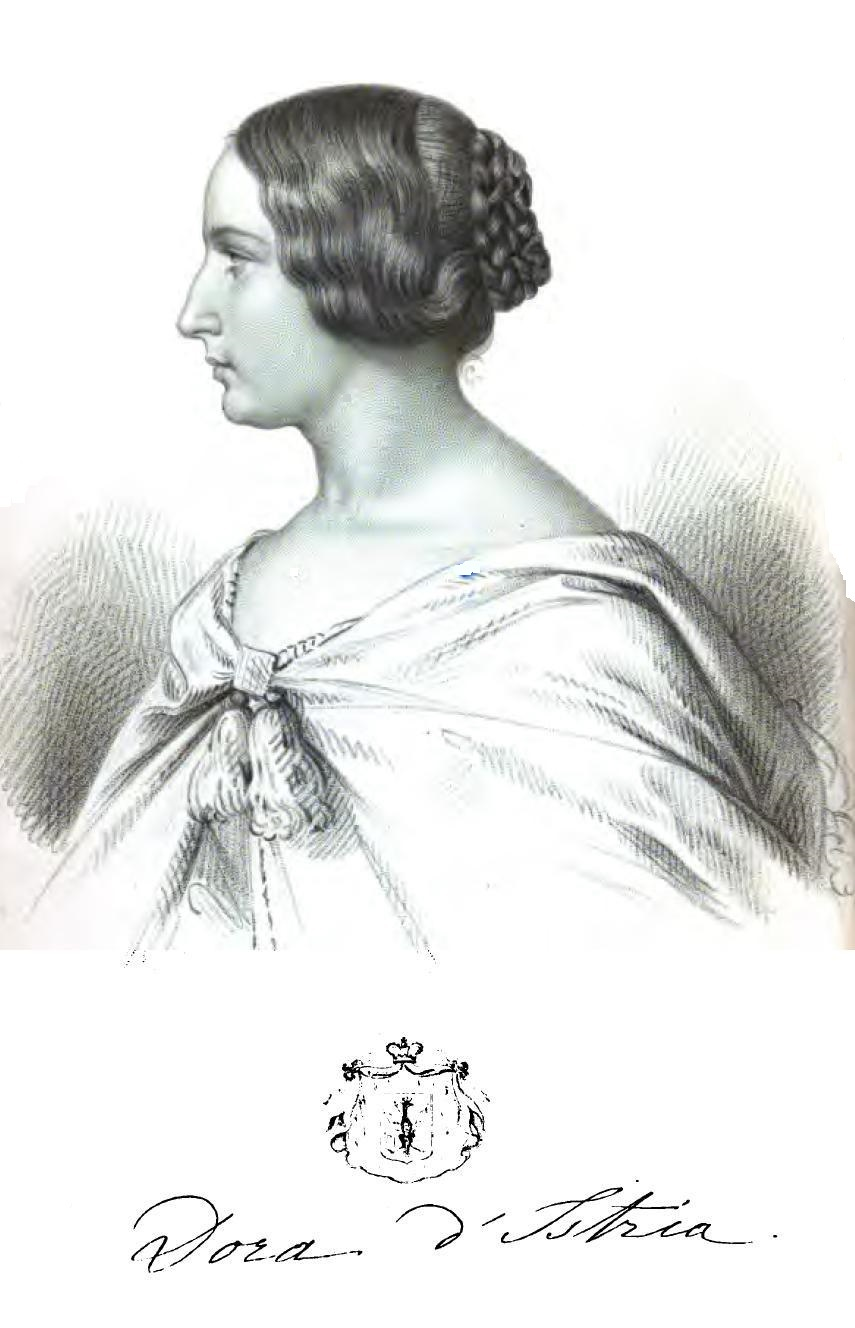
Romanticist writer Dora d'Istria.

The inner experiences of the individual freed from the chains of medieval, Oriental mentality on one hand and the philosophical pantheism imbued with the poetical pantheism of the European Romanticism on the other hand, give to the lyrical meditations of Frashëri and philosophical dimension. The poems of Lulet e verës (Summer Flowers) collection are the philosophical lyrics on life and death, on time that goes by and never comes back leaving behind tormenting memories in the heart of man, on the Creator melt with the Universe. Naim Frashëri is the founder of the national literature of the Albanians and of the national literary language. He raised Albanian to a modern language of culture, evolving it in the model of the popular speech.

The world of the romantic hero with its vehement feelings is brought to Albanian Romanticism by the poetry of Zef Serembe. The poetry of Ndre Mjeda and Andon Zako Çajupi, who lived at the end of Renaissance, bears the signs of disintegration of the artistic system of Romanticism in Albanian literature.

Çajupi (1866–1930) is a rustic poet, the type of a folk bard, called the Mistral of Albania; he brought to Albanian literature the comedy of customs and the tragedy of historical themes. Graduated from a French college in Alexandria and the Geneva University, a good connoisseur of French literature, Çajupi was among the first translate La Fontaine's fables into Albanian, thus opening the way to the translation and adoption of works of world literature into Albanian, which has been and remains one of the major ways of communication with the world culture.

Distinguished writers of this period are: Naum Veqilharxhi, Sami Frashëri, Vaso Pasha, Jeronim de Rada, Gavril Dara the Younger, Zef Serembe, Naim Frashëri, Dora d'Istria, Andon Zako Çajupi, Ndre Mjeda, Luigj Gurakuqi, Filip Shiroka, Mihal Grameno, Risto Siliqi, Aleksandër Stavre Drenova, etc.

== Modern period ==
=== Independence ===
The main direction taken by the Albanian literature between the two World Wars was realism, but it also bore remnants of romanticism.

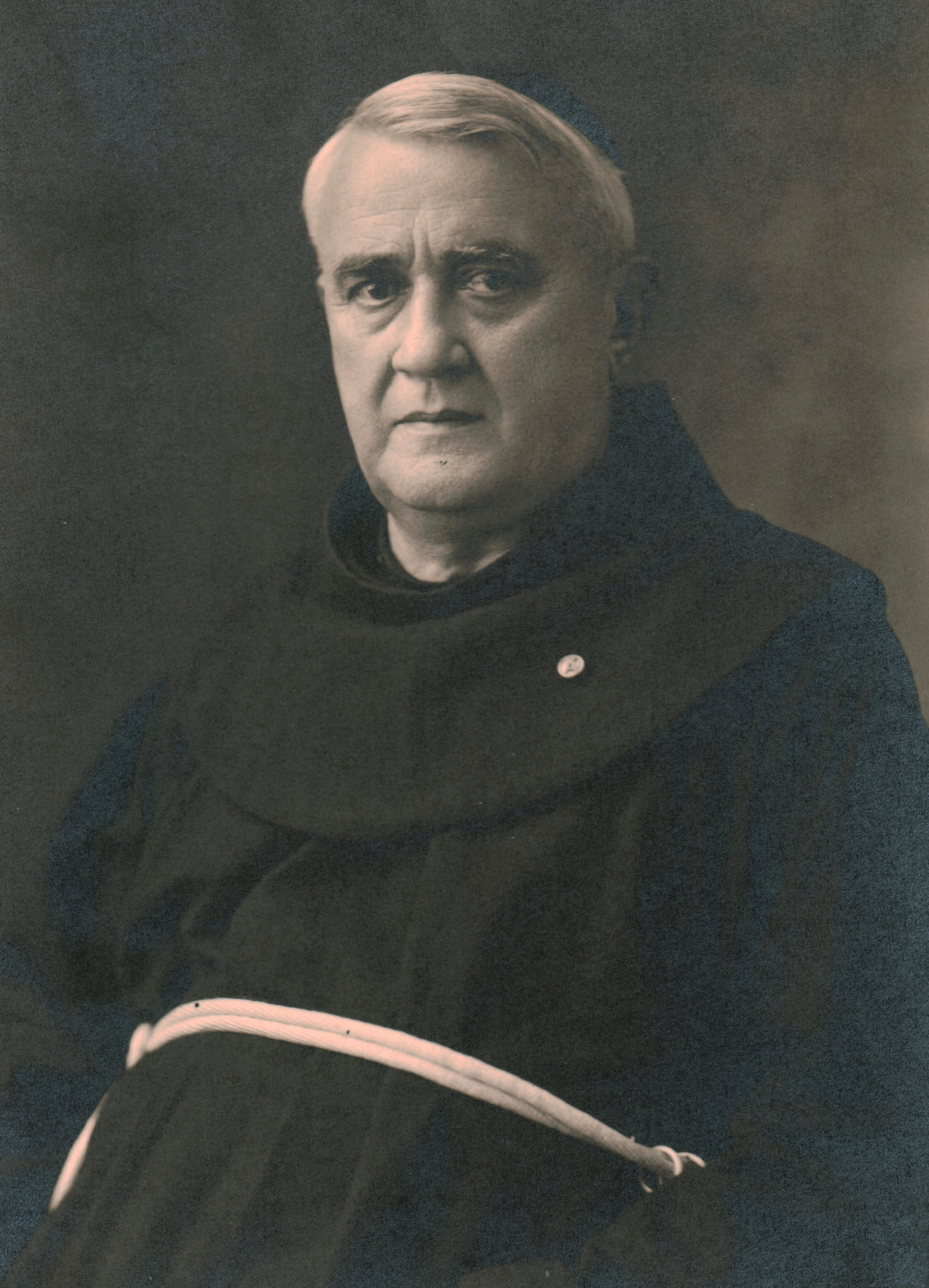
Gjergj Fishta

Gjergj Fishta (1871–1940), wrote a poem of national epos breadth The Highland Lute (Lahuta e malësisë) in 17.000 verses, in the spirit of Albanian historical and legendary epos, depicting the struggles of Northern highlanders against Slav onslaughts. With this work he remains the greatest epical poet of Albanians. A Franciscan priest, erudite and a member of the Italian Academy, Gjergj Fishta is a multifaceted personality of Albanian culture: epical and lyrical poet, publicist and satirist, dramatist and translator, active participant in the Albanian cultural and political life between the two Wars. His major work, The Highland Lute (1937, english edition 2005), is a reflection of the Albanian life and mentality, a poetical mosaic of historic and legendary exploits, traditions and customs of the highlands, a live fresco of the history of an old people, which places on its center the type of Albanian carved in the calvary of his life along the stream of centuries which had been savage to him. Fishta's poem is distinguished by its vast linguistic wealth, is a receptacle for the richness of the popular speech of the highlands, the live and infinite phraseology and the diversity of clear syntax constructions, which give vitality and strength to the poetic expression. The poetical collections Mrizi i Zanave (The Fairies' Mead) with patriotic verse and Vallja e Parrizit (Paris's Dance) with verses of a religious spirit, represent Fishta as a refined lyrical poet, while his other works Anzat e Parnasit (Parnassus' Anises) and Gomari i Babatasit (Babatas' Donkey) represent him as an unrepeatable satirical poet. In the field of drama, Juda Makabe and Ifigjenia n' Aulli may be mentioned along his tragedies with biblical and mythological themes.

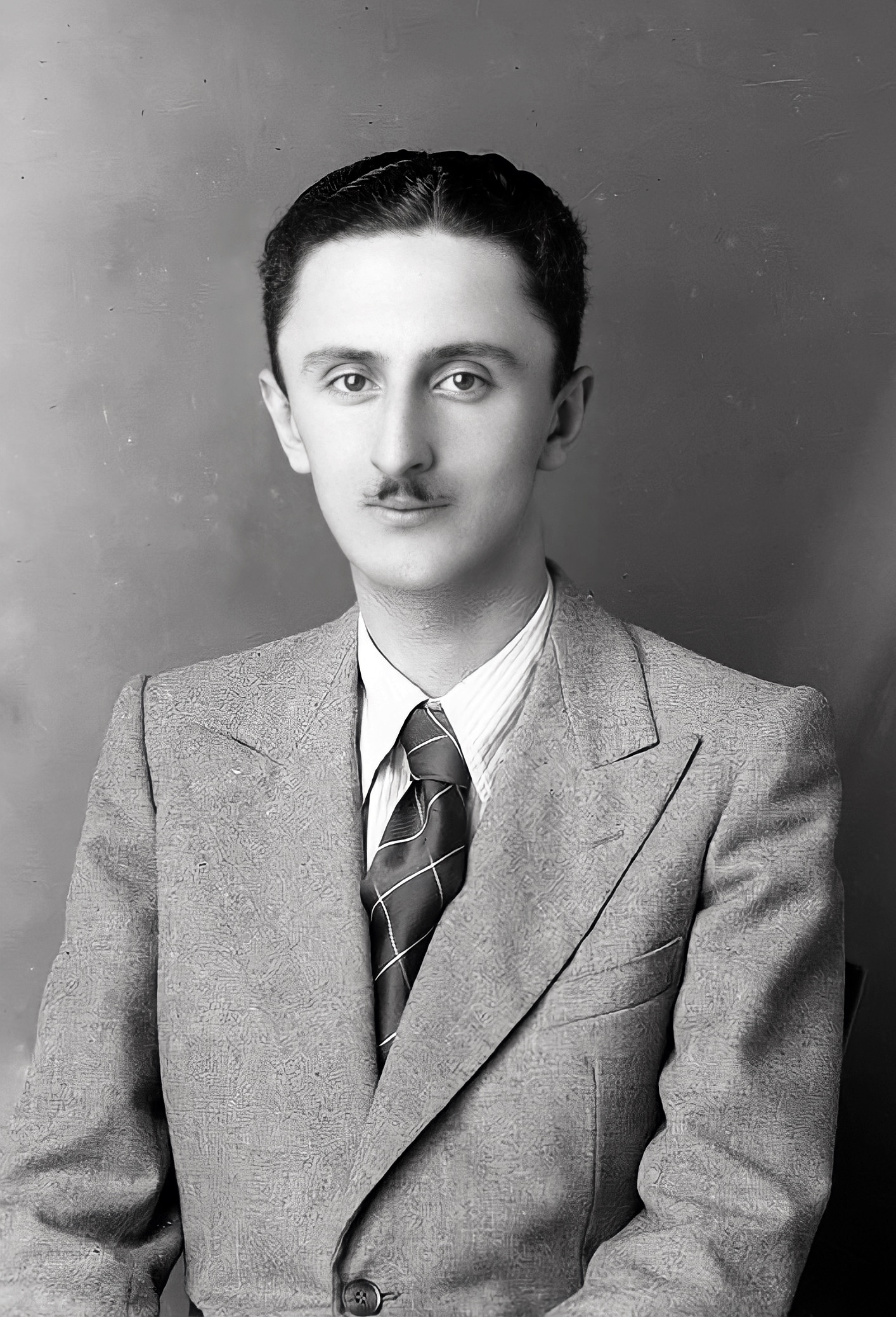
Migjeni

The typical representative of realism was Millosh Gjergj Nikolla, Migjeni (1913–1938). His poetry Free Verse (Vargjet e lira, 1936; English, 2015), and prose are permeated by a severe socialist realism on the misery and tragic position of the individual in the society of the time. The characters of his works are people from the lowest strata of Albanian society. Some of Migjeni's stories are novels in miniature; their themes represent the conflict of the individual with institutions and the patriarchal and conservative morality. The rebellious nature of Migjeni's talent broke the traditionalism of Albanian poetry and prose by bringing a new style and forms in poetry and narrative. He is one of the greatest reformers of Albanian literature, the first great modern Albanian writer.

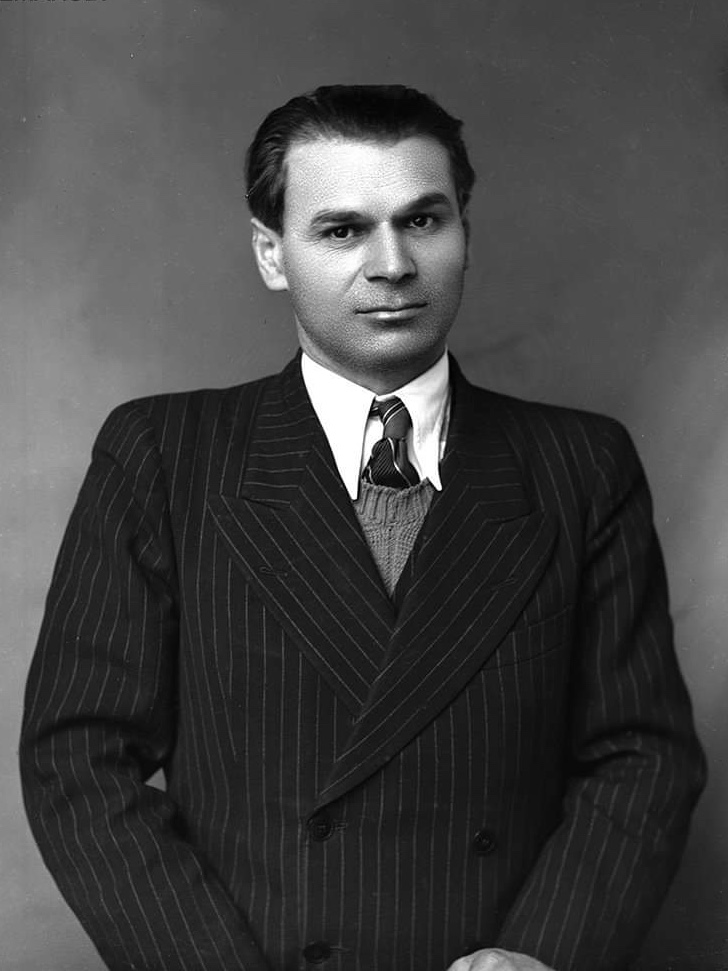
Lasgush Poradeci

Lasgush Poradeci (1899–1987), a notable lyrical poet, wrote soft and warm poetry, but with a deep thinking and a charming musicality Vallja e yjeve (The Dance of Stars), 1933, Ylli i zemrës (The Star of Heart), 1937.

Fan Stilian Noli (1882–1965) F.S. Noli is one of the most versatile figures—he was a distinguished poet, historian, dramatist, aesthete and musicologist, publicist, translator and master of Albanian. With his poetry, non-fiction, scientific and religious prose, as well as with his translations, Noli has played a fundamental role in the development of the modern Albanian. His introductions to his own translations of world literature made him Albania's foremost literary critic of the inter-war period. He wrote the plays The Awakening and Israelites and Philistines and in 1947 he published in English the study Beethoven and the French Revolution.

Albanian literature between the two Wars did not lack manifestations of sentimentalism (Foqion Postoli, Mihal Grameno) and of belated classicism, especially in drama (Et'hem Haxhiademi). Manifestations of the modern trends, impressionism, Symbolism, etc. were isolated phenomena in the works of some writers (Migjeni, Poradeci, and Asdreni), that did not succeed in forming a school. Deep changes were seen in the system of genres; prose (Migjeni, F. S. Noli, Faik Konitza, Ernest Koliqi, Mitrush Kuteli, etc.) drama and satire (Gjergj Fishta, Kristo Floqi) developed parallel to poetry. Ernest Koliqi wrote subtle prose, full of coloring from his town of Shkodër, (Tregtar flamujsh, (Trader of Flags), 1935. Mitrush Kuteli is a magician of Albanian, the writer that cultivated the folk style of narration into a charming prose, Net shqiptare (Albanian Nights) 1938; Ago Jakupi 1943; Kapllan aga i Shaban Shpatës (Kapllan Aga of Shaban Shpata), 1944.

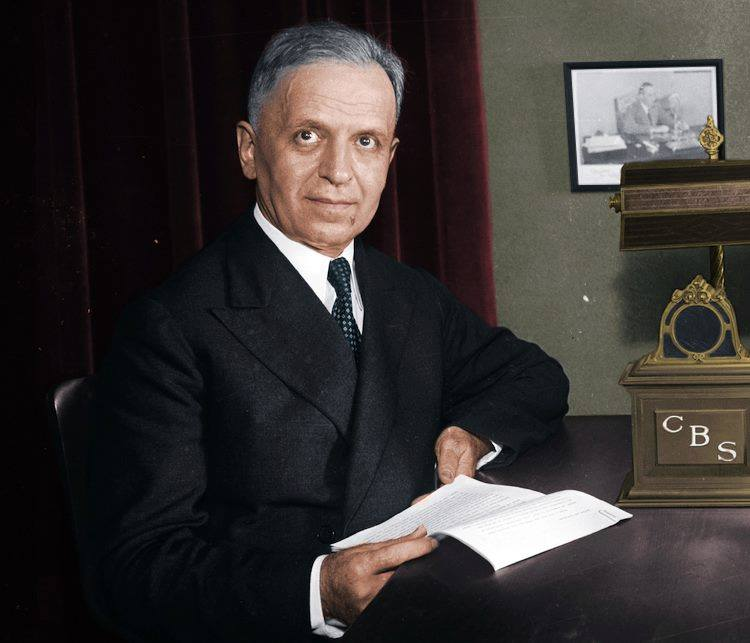
Faik Konica.

Faik Konica is the master who gave Albanian prose a modern image. Coming from a renowned family, inheriting the conscience of belonging to an elite, which he manifested strongly in his life and work, he discarded Oriental mentality, inherited from the Ottoman occupation, with a joking smile that he translated into a cutting sarcasm in his work. Erudite, knowledgeable in all major European languages and some Eastern ones, a friend of Guillaume Apollinaire, called by foreigners "a walking encyclopaedia", Konitza became the model of Western intellectual for the Albanian culture. Since his youth he was dedicated to the national movement, but contrary to the mythical, idealising and romanticising feeling of the Renaissance, he brought in it the spirit of criticism and experienced the perennial pain of the idealist who suffers for his own thoughts. He established the Albania magazine (Brussels 1897–1900, London 1902–1909), that became the most important Albanian press organ of the Renaissance. Publicist, essayist, poet, prose writer, translator and literary critic, he, among others, is the author of the studies L'Albanie et les Turcs (Paris 1895), Memoire sur le mouvement national Albanais (Brussels, 1899), of novels Një ambasadë e zulluve në Paris (An Embassy of the Zulu in Paris) (1922) and Doktor Gjilpëra (Doctor Needle) (1924), as well as of the historical-cultural work Albania—the Rock Garden of South-Eastern Europe published posthumously in Massachusetts in 1957.

The literature of the Albanians of Italy in the period between the two Wars continued the tradition of the romanticist school of the 19th century. Zef Skiro (1865–1927) through his work Kthimi (Return), 1913, Te dheu i huaj (In Foreign Soil), 1940, wanted to recover the historical memory of Albanians emigrated since the 15th century after the death of Skanderbeg.

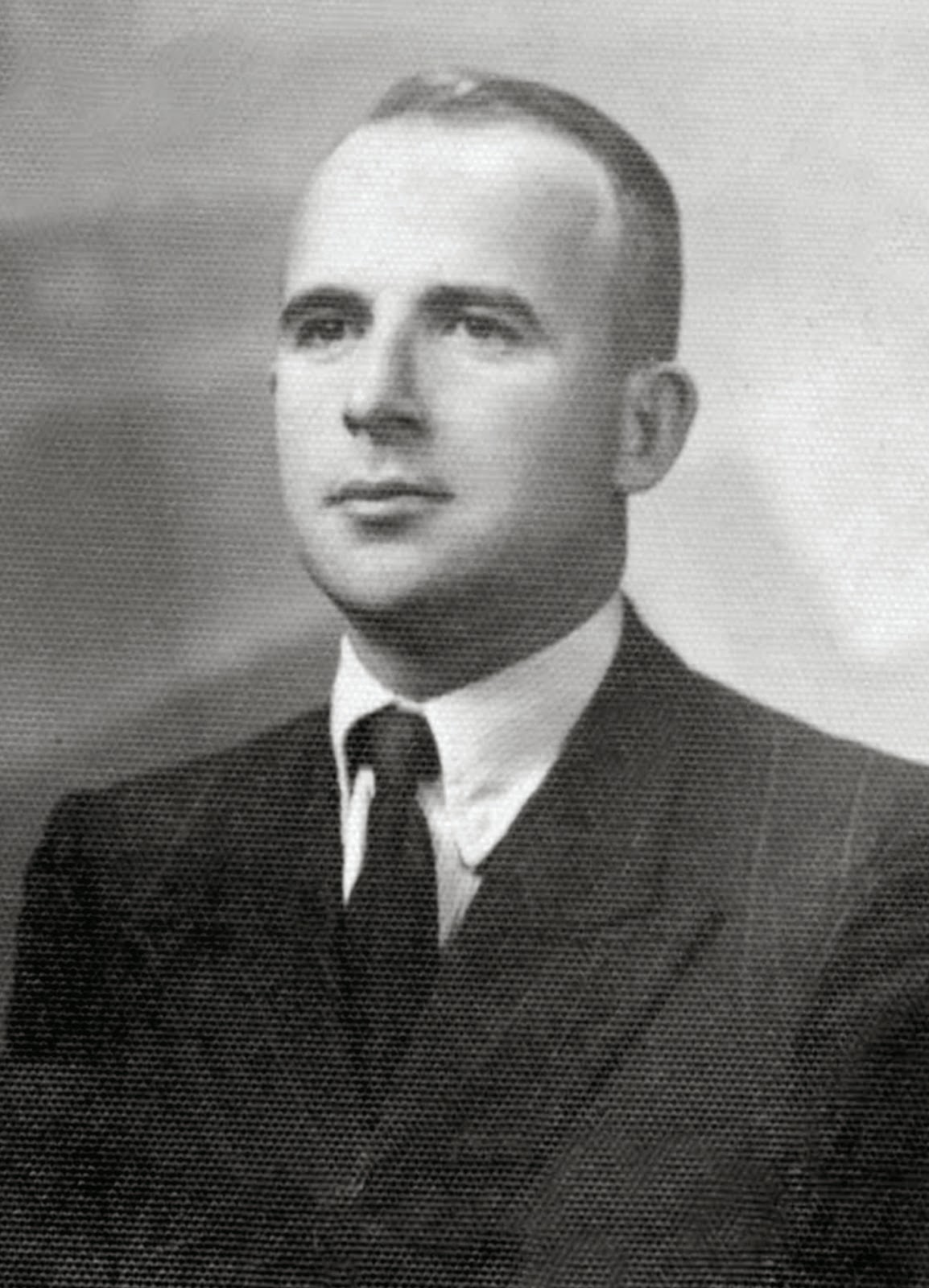
Mitrush Kuteli

Also another distinguished writer of Albanian Romanticism who was published in Albania and abroad was, Lazar Eftimiadhi. A graduate of Sorbone, he wrote several articles introducing the Albanian reader to major works of western literature. He also translated works of writers like Hans Christian Andersen, and collaborated with at Gjergj Fishta and others in many important translations. His collection of short stories titled "Merushja" is a pearl of Albanian Romanticism and Humanity and was published by several houses including a 1932 London Edition.

Distinguished writers of this period are: Fan Stilian Noli, Gjergj Fishta, Faik Konitza, Haki Stërmilli, Lasgush Poradeci, Mitrush Kuteli, Migjeni, etc.

== Socialism ==
The drastic political change after the Communist takeover in Albania interrupted connections to pre-WWII literary traditions. The new regime had an extremely suspicious attitude towards intellectuals and writers, who were seen as representatives of the "old regime". Those years were characterized by notorious witch hunts against writers. The practices and policies undertaken by Stalin in the 1930s in the Soviet Union were applied in Albania throughout the 46 years of Communist rule.

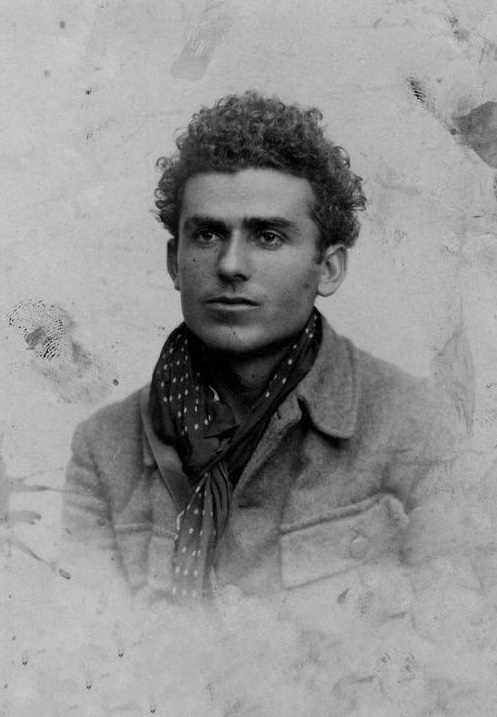
Petro Marko

In the political and cultural context of Communist Albania, writers could choose either complete obedience and service to the regime, compromise with clans in the Albanian Writers Union, or stop publishing their works. The later option led to the creation of the "literature of the drawers". Yet very few writers were able to hide their works due to the strict surveillance from the Communist authorities, and no one was able to circulate their works illegally, so samizdat were non-existent throughout the Communist period in Albania. Any writers deemed suspicious by the authorities were arrested, imprisoned, or executed, with or without trial.

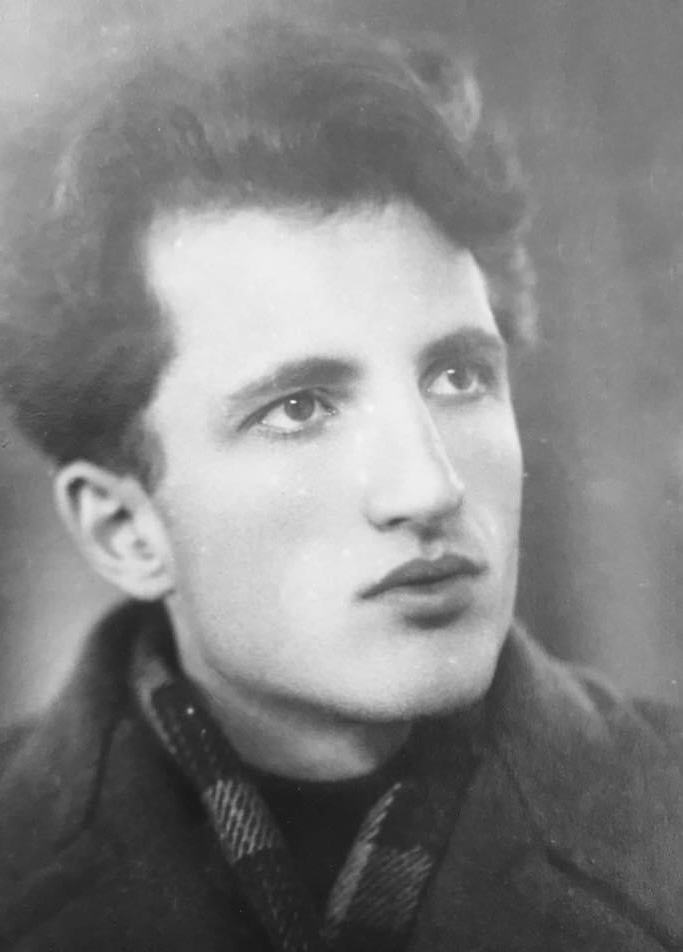
Dritëro Agolli

The literature of this period developed within the framework of Socialist Realism, the only direction allowed by official policy. Albanian writers had to focus on the partisan war and the efforts to build socialism, and also prevent the influence of "decadent" Western culture. Subjects which did not contribute to Communist ideology and politics were deemed taboo. The very treatment of taboo subjects in a conformist manner amounted to extreme dissent. During the Cultural Revolution, some leadership figures (including Fadil Paçrami and Todi Lubonja) successfully pushed to lessen restraints on literature and culture. However, after a brief period of relaxation, cultural supervision was again tightened from 1972 onwards due to a perceived deterioriation of discipline and rise of absenteeism, phenomena which Hoxha linked to a lack of ideological stringency.

The most prevalent type of novel was the Socialist Realist novel with highly ethical and historical overtones and a linear subject matter (Jakov Xoxa, Sterjo Spasse, Fatmir Gjata), but novels with a rugged composition, open poetics, and a philosophical substratum issuing from association of ideas and historical analogies (Ismail Kadare, Petro Marko) as well as the satirical novel were not lacking. A satirical novel is The Rise and Fall of Comrade Zylo by Dritëro Agolli.

The short story and novel were developed by Dhimitër Shuteriqi, Teodor Laço, Dhimitër Xhuvani, Petraq Zoto, and others; poetry by Ismail Kadare, Dritëro Agolli, Fatos Arapi, Xhevahir Spahiu, Mimoza Ahmeti, and others. Drama and comedy (by Spiro Çomora, Karnavalet e Korçës (The Carnival of Korça), 1961) developed to a lesser degree.

== Contemporary period ==
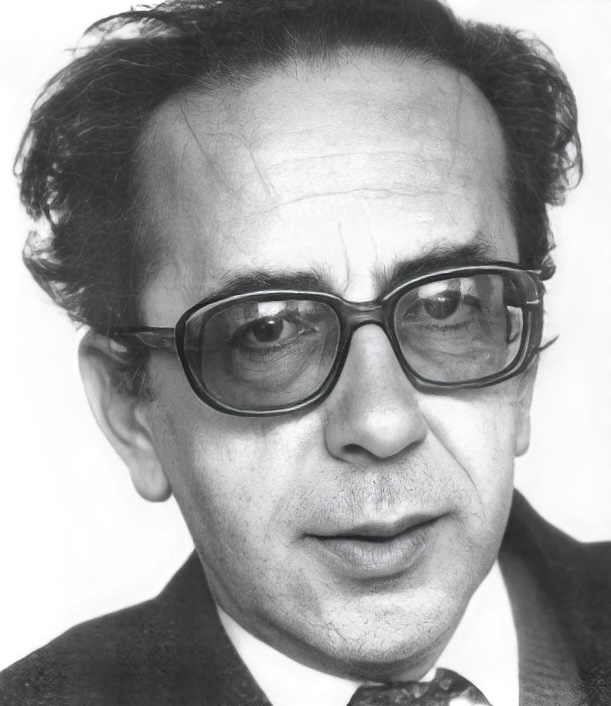
Ismail Kadare

Albania's best-known contemporary writer is Ismail Kadare (1936–2024) whose novels have been translated into 45 languages. With his novels The General of the Dead Army (1963), The Siege (1970), Chronicle in Stone (1971), The Three-Arched Bridge (1978), Broken April (1980), The File on H. (1981), The Palace of Dreams (1981), The Pyramid (1992); and The Successor (2002), Kadare brought Albanian literature into the mainstream of modern European literature.

The central theme of Kadare's works is totalitarianism and its mechanisms. His work represents an artistic encyclopedia of Albanian life. The philosophy, beliefs, dramas, and historical and cultural traditions of Albania, filtered through the artistry of the writer, in Kadare's work, express the vitality of the spiritual culture of the Albanian people. Kadare creates a modern prose making wide use of historical analogies, parables and associations, Albanian legends and mythology. Starting from the epic world of medieval legends and ballads, the prose of Kadare brings ancient folk traditions 'up to date' by showing their relevance to the modern world.

In 1992 Kadare was awarded the Prix mondial Cino Del Duca; in 1998, the Herder Prize; in 2005, the inaugural Man Booker International Prize; in 2009, the Prince of Asturias Award of Arts; and in 2015, the Jerusalem Prize. He was awarded the Park Kyong-ni Prize in 2019, and the Neustadt International Prize for Literature in 2020. In 1996, France made him a foreign associate of the Académie des Sciences Morales et Politiques of France, and in 2016, he was a Commandeur de la Légion d'Honneur recipient. He has been nominated for the Nobel Prize in Literature 15 times. Since the 1990s, Kadare has been asked by both major political parties in Albania to become a consensual President of Albania, but has declined.

His nominating juror for the Neustadt Prize wrote: "Kadare is the successor of Franz Kafka. No one since Kafka has delved into the infernal mechanism of totalitarian power and its impact on the human soul in as much hypnotic depth as Kadare." His writing has also been compared to that of Nikolai Gogol, George Orwell, Gabriel García Márquez, Milan Kundera, and Balzac. Living in Albania during a time of strict censorship, Kadare devised cunning stratagems to outwit Communist censors who had banned three of his books, using devices such as parable, myth, fable, folk-tale, allegory, and legend, sprinkled with double-entendre, allusion, insinuation, satire, and coded messages. In 1990, to escape the Communist regime and its Sigurimi secret police he defected to Paris. The New York Times wrote that he was a national figure in Albania comparable in popularity perhaps to Mark Twain in the United States, and that "there is hardly an Albanian household without a Kadare book." Kadare is regarded by some as one of the greatest writers and intellectuals of the 20th and 21st centuries.

Ridvan Dibra is a leading figure of contemporary Albanian literature, and author of several innovative works. He has been rewarded with several national and international prizes, including the Rexhai Surroi Prize for the best Albanian novel of the year 2012, for his novel, "Legjenda e vetmisë" (The Legend of Solitude).

Luljeta Lleshanaku is one of the most important and most acclaimed Albanian poets today. She's the author of seven volumes of poetry, a couple of which have been translated in various languages. English translations include: "Fresco" (2002), "Child of Nature"(2010), "Haywire: New and Selected Poems" (2011) and "Negative Space"(2018), the translation of which by Ani Gjika has been shortlisted for the 2019 Griffin Poetry Prize. She received the 2009 Crystal Vilenica Award for European poets.

Irma Kurti is not only a prolific poet but also a talented writer, lyricist, journalist, and translator. She is a naturalized Italian and lives in Bergamo, Italy. Irma Kurti has published 118 works, including books of poetry, fiction, and translations. Her poetry has been translated into 40 languages. She is one of the most translated and published Albanian poets. Her books have been translated and published in 24 countries.

Fatos Kongoli, born in 1944 in Elbasan, is considered to be one of the most "forceful and convincing" representatives of contemporary Albanian literature. During the Stalinist dictatorship in Albania he did not write or publish any important works. He came to prominence after the regime fell, with his novel The Loser (1992). His novels deal with the years of the Hoxha regime and the aftermath, as Albanian society transitions into a democracy without being able to shake off the demons of the past.

Other important writers include Ben Blushi, whose debut novel Living on an Island (2008), dealing with the Islamization of Albanians, went on to become a best-selling book after the fall of Communism in Albania. His second novel, Otello, the Moor of Vlora (2009), was awarded the European Union Prize for Literature. His later novels went on to become national bestsellers.

Ag Apolloni (born 13 June 1982) is an Albanian writer, poet, playwright, scholar, and essay writer. He is a professor at the University of Prishtina, Kosovo. His literary works are widely acclaimed for their dramatic dimension, philosophical treatment, and critical attitude towards history, politics, and society. In 2020 he was granted citizenship of Albania.

== See also ==
- Culture of Albania
- Albanian language
- Albanian folklore
- Albanian epic poetry
- National Library of Albania
- Albanians and Arbëreshë

== Sources ==
- Antologjia e letërsisë shqiptare 1", Shtëpia Botuese e Librit Shkollor, Tirana, 1996
- "Historia e letërsisë shqipe I, II", Instituti i Historisë e i Gjuhësisë i Universitetit të Tiranës, Tirana, 1960.
- "Historia e letërsisë shqiptare", Akademia e Shkencave, Tirana, 1983
- Eqrem Çabej, "Shqiptarët midis Perëndimit dhe Lindjes", Tirana, 1994
- Jorgo Bulo, "Letërsia shqiptare" – shqiperia.com
