= Nasibi Tahir Babai =

Albanian saint

Nasibi Tahir Babai (died 1835), born Tahir Skënderasi, was an Albanian Bektashi wali and bejtexhi.

Tahir Babai took the nickname Nasibi (the fortunate one) after it was reported that the door of the tekke of Haji Bektash Veli in Asia Minor opened miraculously of its own accord to allow him to enter. In his late years he settled in Frashër, Kazza of Përmet, back then Ottoman Empire (today's Albania), where he founded the Tekke of Frashër, a Bektashi tekke which played an important role not only the religious point of view as a key Sufi center, but also had a role in the Albanian National Awakening process.

The tekke was built in 1815 and he served there until his death in 1835. He developed the tekke of Frashër and the one in Leskovik as cultural and literature centers. He inspired two other Bektashi raised Albanian writers, Şemseddin Sami and his brother Naim Frashëri, who contributed to forging the Albanian national conscience. Tahir Babai was regarded as one of three spiritual advisers of Ali Pasha Tepelena.

He was buried in a türbe near the tekke he built, and his grave is a pilgrimage destination.

Nasibi Tahir had studied in Iran, traveled around the Middle East in his youth, visiting Iraq and other Arab countries where he got in touch with Oriental literature. However, the work that he created was lost. According to Şemseddin Sami's Ottoman encyclopedia Kamûs-ül Â'lâm, he composed much verse in Albanian, Turkish, and Persian.

"Tahir Nasibi Babai is one of the Bektashi leaders. He was born in Frashër, my village. He spent some time visiting the holy places. And after his return, he founded a small tekke in Frashër which over time grew and today is the biggest one. He died in 1835 and was buried in a mausoleum near his tekke, which is visited today by all. Nasibi has written many poems in Albanian. Besides these, he has also written many Ghazals in Turkish and Persian languages. Once, while returning to his homeland after visiting the holy places, he happened to stop in the Leskovik town, where scholars of the time met and took him in for questioning to test his religious culture. Nasibi answered all these questions with a qasidah (long poem)"

— Şemseddin Sami, Kamûs-ül Â'lâm

== See also ==
- Dalip Frashëri
