= Dalip Frashëri =

Albanian Bektashi sheikh and bejtexhi (fl. 19th century)

- Born: Dalip Kaso; Frashër, Janina Vilayet, Ottoman Empire
- Died: Konitsa, Ottoman Empire
- Other name: Hyxhretiu (pen-name)
- Family: Kasollari family

Dalip bey Frashëri, also known with the pen-name Hyxhretiu (the exiled), was an Albanian Bektashi sheikh and bejtexhi of the 19th century. His poem Kopshti i te mirevet (Garden of the martyrs) is the first and the longest epic known in the Albanian literature.

== Life ==
Dalip was born in Frashër, Janina Vilayet, Ottoman Empire. A dervish originating in a family with strong Bektashi roots, and played an important part in the local tekke there. He was the son of Kaso Frashëri, and brother of poet Shahin Frashëri and despite what is believed, it appears that they were not relatives with brothers Naim, Sami, and Abdyl Frashëri. Not much is known about his life, except that he work for years on his poem Garden of the martyrs. He finished it in 1842, while being interned in the tekke of Konitsa by the Ottoman authorities.

Frashëri used the Arabic alphabet in his work. Although he was the author of other poems, the one that remains from him is the Garden of the martyrs (Kopshti i te mirevet). It tells the story of the Battle of Karbala, which had previously influenced Shia and Sufi literature. It was finished on 21 Rabi II 1258 in Islamic Calendar, which corresponds to 6 June 1842. This information comes from some of the verses:

Hadikanë bërë teqmil,...
ndë këtë mubareq sene,
që është pesëdhjet' e tetë,
ndë rebi-yl ahirënde,
njëzet e një dit vërtet,
sonte ditën e xhuma.

Translation:

The fulfilled garden,...
on this happy year,
that is fifty-eight,
in this stately spring,
twenty-one days really,
tonight that is Friday.

A poem of around 56,000 verses based on the region's specific sub-dialect of Tosk, it is the earliest and longest epic piece written in Albanian. It is believed to have been intended for ritual ceremonies in tekkes and home rituals during the mätam.

While is based on the work of Azerbaijani poet Fuzûlî, also named Hadîkat üs-Süedâ (حديقت السعداء; "Garden of martyrs"), it is the first attempts by Bektashi Albanians to rival Fuzûlî and show the significant impact of Bektashism in Albanian life of those times. While Fuzûlî used both poetry and prose for his poem, Frashëri relied only on verses. The poem includes information on Albanian customs, festivals, and sensibilities. For instance, it gives details on the Mätam ritual, where the Bektashis refrain from drinking water. Therefore, even if it seems that Frashëri's initial idea was to translate and adapt Fuzûlî's work, it ended up as a truly national and comprehensible composition on its own.

The poem is divided in ten sections, and is preceded by an introduction. The intro tells the story of the Bektashism in Albania, with plenty of information believed he gathered from Baba Shemin of Krujë and Nasibi Tahir Babai, both Bektashi important figures of that time. The poem cites the sect's important personalities, latter additions, and propagation. It follows with the history of the Arabs before Islam, the work of the Prophet, his life and death, and events that led to the Karbala tragedy. The Battle of Karbala is described in detail; Frashëri eulogizes those who fell as martyrs, in particular Husayn ibn Ali.

The poem is believed to have served to some extent as the base model for the later work of the Albanian nationalist poet Naim Frashëri named Qerbelaja (Karbala), and also for the epic Istori' e Skenderbeut (History of Scanderbeg), published in Bucharest in 1898. It is one of the latest works written in Albanian using the Arabic alphabet.

== Notes and references ==
=== Explanatory notes ===
a: Robert Elsie and other Albanian sources mention 65,000 verses, Norris 56,000, and Shuteriqi 56,000, while the official Bektashi portal cites 60,000.
