= Kamberi =

Kamberi is an Albanian surname. Notable people with the surname include:

- Florian Kamberi (born 1995), Swiss-born Albanian football player
- Hasan Zyko Kamberi, 18th-19th century Albanian writer
- Lindrit Kamberi (born 1999), Swiss footballer
- Shaip Kamberi (born 1964), Serbian politician with Albanian ethnicity

== See also ==
- Kambari languages
