= Shahin Frashëri =

Albanian poet

Shahin Frashëri was an Albanian bejtexhi of the 19th century. His Mukhtarnameh poem is one of the longest and earliest epics in Albanian literature.

== Life and work ==
Shahin (Shahinin) Kaso Frashëri was born in Frashër, today's Përmet District, back then part of the Janina Vilayet of the Ottoman Empire. He was the younger brother of the other poet Dalip Frashëri, and uncle of the Albanian poets and National Awakening activists Naim, Sami, and Abdyl Frashëri.
Not much is known on his life. He left his name in the Albanian literature with his poem Mukhtarnameh (Book of Mukhtar), Albanian: Myhtarnameja, an epic poem of around 12,000 verses. It describes the events post Battle of Karbala of 680 AD where Husayn ibn Ali got killed, an important event in the chronology of Islam. Frashëri describes the rebellion of Mukhtar al-Thaqafi of 66 AH (corresponding to 685-6 AD), and the Alid movement in vengeance for the death of Husayn ibn Ali.
Frashëri finished his work in 1868. He used a Turkish version as base or intermediary model, though the original is in Persian. It is one of the latest major Bektashi-Shia work written in Albanian using the Arabic script. By that time, the National Awakening had started and Bektashis of Albania switched to the new Albanian scripts.

According to the Jordanian professor Muhammad Mufaku al-Arna'ut, who has studied in detail the early Arabic script based Albanian poetry, the Mukhtarnameh together with the Garden of the martyrs (Alb: Kopshti i te mirevet) of Frashëri's brother Dalip, established a subgenre of its own within the Albanian poetry. They served as base model for the later work of the Albanian nationalist poet Naim Frashëri named Qerbelaja (Karbala), and also for the epic Istori' e Skenderbeut (History of Scanderbeg), published in Bucharest in 1898.

Very short excerpts of Muktarnameh have been published so far.

== See also ==
- Haxhi Ymer Kashari
