= Petraq Zoto =

Albanian writer

- Born: December 20, 1937; Ziçisht, Albania
- Died: September 6, 2015 (aged 77); Tirana, Albania
- Occupation: Writer
- Spouse: Tatjana Zoto
- Writing career
- Language: Albanian
- Genres: short stories, novels, children's literature
- Notable works: Tirka, 1966; Gjahu i së dielës, 1984; Burimi i drerit, 2000
- Notable awards: "Ezopi", 1998 "Penda e argjendtë", 2000
- Literary movement: Socialist realism Contemporary

Petraq Zoto (December 20, 1937 – September 6, 2015) was an Albanian writer. He is mostly known for his collection of stories, and books targeting children and young readers.

== Life ==
Petraq Zoto was born in Ziçisht, in Devoll region, in southeastern Albania. He started writing prose at an early age, according to Zoto himself "he didn't even remember exactly when". At one of the literary meetings organized in his area, he met with the Albanian writer Sterjo Spasse. Spasse's words "Lexo sa më shumë, dhe provo të shkruash!" (Read as much as you can, and try writing!) had a significant impact on him, increased his curiosity, and forged his will of becoming a writer. Zoto writing on the impressions of his encounter with Spasse was sent to the newspaper Zëri i Rinisë (Voice of Youth), but wasn't published. Nevertheless, he continued writing short stories. He sent his first collection of stories to the other Albanian writer, Sotir Andoni who was from the same town, who helped with further instructions on how to improve the technique of story-writing. With the membership and active frequentation of the literary class of the Culture Palace (Alb: Pallati i Kulturës) in Korçë, came a big jump in the quality of his works. There he came in contact and befriended other future writers as Teodor Laço and Koçi Petriti.
His first published story was in the almanac Korça letrare (Literary Korçë), selected by the writer Andon Mara. Another one would come published in the Pionieri magazine, later followed by the literary section of Ylli magazine, and so on.
His first collection of stories for young readers Tirka, which was run in the national yearly competition of literature in 1966, ending up third. At this time Zoto would leave his town and move to Korçë, where he spent the most important part of his life. There he worked, created, and was affirmed as a writer and director in the culture field. For over 30 years he served as director of the Culture Palace in Korçë, followed by the Korçë Theater, until 1990 when he was fired on direct orders of one of the politburo members, due to a recital of Lindita Theodhori which was considered "too modernist". He was also chairman of the local branch of the League of Writers and Artists, which comprised approximately 120 writers and poets as members. Inspired by the patriotic work of Themistokli Gërmenji, Mihal Grameno, Jovan Kosturi, Sevasti Qiriazi, and others, he published in 1981 a collection of historical stories.
Since 2000, Zoto lived in Tirana. During 2001–2005, he worked as editor of the "Mësonjëtorja" publishing house there. He continued to write until his last moments, and died in 2015 in Tirana.

== Profile ==
Zoto's motto was "The literature is not a battlefield, where the writers struggle to grab the trophies from one another, but a huge field where each one works his own parcel, waters it, takes care of it, and at the end harvests its desired fruits. So, each one has his/her own part, can contribute, in other words, introduce a new literary value with every new book". Zoto created real personages based on his own personal experience, also on his life events, his ancestors, and influenced by the elite of the writers of Korçë region, such as Sterjo Spasse, Dritero Agolli, Sotir Andoni, Vasil Xhaçka, Teodor Laço, Vangjush Ziko, Petraq Kolevica, Petraq Samsuri, etc.

As one of the pioneers of the short stories genre of the Albanian literature, he is established as a strong narrator, who possessed the ability and literary strength of creating realistic personages with a sharp sense of both "the possible" and "the unpredictable". He always focused on difficult subjects, transforming them into stories which transmit hope and positivism.

== Work ==
Collections of stories

- Tirka, 1966, publisher in two volumes:
  - Mësuesi im i parë' (My first teacher), Tirana: Shtëpia Botonjëse "Naim Frashëri", 1966.
  - Ndërgjegjja (Conscience), Tirana: Shtëpia Botonjëse "Naim Frashëri", 1967.
- Dritat nuk u shuan (The lights didn't turn off), Tirana: Shtëpia Botonjëse "Naim Frashëri", 1967. OCLC 81582653.
- Tregimet e një nxënësi (Stories of a schoolkid), Tirana: Shtëpia Botuese "Naim Frashëri", 1968. OCLC 320011865.
- Taksia u ndal te kthesa (The cab stopped at the corner), Tirana: Shtëpia Botuese "Naim Frashëri", 1968. OCLC 18365784.
- Mëngjesi i përflakur (Glowing morning), Tirana: Shtëpia Botuese "Naim Frashëri", 1971.
- Tregime të zgjedhura (Selected stories), Tirana: Shtëpia Botuese "Naim Frashëri", 1975.
- Kumbimi i një krisme (The tintinnabulation of a gunshot), Tirana: Shtëpia Botuese "Naim Frashëri", 1975.
- Dy buzëqeshje (Two smiles), Tirana: Shtëpia Botuese "Naim Frashëri", 1981.
- Bredhi i gjelbër (The green fir), Tirana: Shtëpia Botuese "Naim Frashëri", 1981. OCLC 13847603.
- Gjahu i së dielës (Sunday hunting), Tirana: Shtëpia Botuese "Naim Frashëri", 1984.
- Nesër bëhet vonë (Tomorrow is late), Tirana: Shtëpia Botuese "Naim Frashëri", 1986. OCLC 17769156.
- Universi njeri (The man universe), Tirana: Shtepia Botuese "Mësonjëtorja", 2007. ISBN 9789994335695.
- Enigma e një ftese: tregime të zgjedhura (Enigma of an invitation: selected stories), Tirana: Naimi, 2014. ISBN 9789928109682.

Novels

- Verka (Verka), Tirana: Shtëpia Botuese "Naim Frashëri", 1971. OCLC 17769986.
- Për sot dhe për ditët që vijnë... (For today and the days that will come...), original title Sot erdhi dita (The day has come), Tirana: Shtëpia Botuese "Naim Frashëri", 1978. OCLC 18384114.
- Kali fluturues (Flying horse), Tirana: Shtepia Botuese "Mësonjëtorja", 2001. ISBN 9789992746448.
- Bishti i dhelprës (Fox's tail), Tirana: Shtepia Botuese "Mësonjëtorja", 2003. ISBN 9789992746356.
- Burimi i drerit (Deer's fountain), Tirana: "Mësonjëtorja e Parë", 2001. ISBN 9789992711941.
- Genta (Genta), Tirana: Shtepia Botuese "Mësonjëtorja", 2004. ISBN 9789992755624.
- Vetja tjetër (The other self), Tirana: Shtëpia Botuese "Uegen", 2010. ISBN 9789928030191.

== Recognition ==
Zoto's work has received several awards, and prizes in Albanian national competitions:

- Third prize for the story collection Tirka in 1966.
- Third prize for the story collection Tregimet e një nxënësi in 1969.
- Second prize for the story collection Mëngjesi i përflakur in 1971.
- Third prize for the story collection Sot erdhi dita in 1978.
- The best book of 1984 for children and young audiences literature for the story collection Gjahu i së dielës.
- Second prize for the story collection Nesër bëhet vonë in 1986.
- Third prize for the novel Kali fluturues in 1989.
- "Ezopi" award from the Pan-Albanian society of the children and young audiences writers (Alb: Shoqata mbarëshqiptare e shkrimtarëve për fëmijë e të rinj) and the Greek Embassy in Tirana in 1998.
- "Penda e argjendtë" (Silver arrow) award for the novel Burimi i drerit in 2000.
