= Muçi Zade =

Albanian poet

Muçi Zade (from Persian-Ottoman meaning son of Muçi) was the author of the earliest known Albanian poem written in Arabic script and belonging to the era of Bejtexhinj. Nothing is known about him beside his poem Imzot, mos më lerë pa kahve ("My Lord, don't leave me without coffee"), and that he was at an old age at the time he composed it.

The poem is taken from a manuscript discovered in Korça, southeastern Albania, and is dated 1724, or 1725. The 9th verse contains the date of the poem, 1137 AH/1725 AD, in Albanian and Turkish.

Sene bin yüz otuz yedi,
shkrova tarih për një çudi.

In this 17-stanza octosyllabic poem, with an AAAB rhyme in the Albanian original, the author laments not having any coffee with which to break his fast at sunset in the Holy Month of Ramadan. The poem is the earliest Albanian text written in Arabic alphabet that has survived. It is also the oldest Tosk verse written in Albania.

The earliest study of Muçi Zade and his poem was done by Osman Myderrizi in 1955, published in Buletini i Shkencave Shoqerore, titled Letersia Shqipe ne Alfabetin Arab ("Albanian Literature in Arabic Alphabet").

== See also ==
- Bejte
