= Ridvan Dibra =

Albanian writer

Ridvan Dibra (born 9 January 1959) is an Albanian writer. He was born in Shkodër, Albania, where he graduated from university in Albanian Language and Literature and from 1994 started teaching the very same subject there. An innovative writer, Dibra is a leading figure of contemporary Albanian Literature. He has been rewarded with several national and international prizes, including the Rexhai Surroi Prize for best novel of the year in Albanian speaking territories, for his 2012 novel, "Legjenda e vetmisë" (The Legend of Solitude). He is the first postmodern writer in Albania.

== Works ==
- Nudo ("The Nude") (1995)
- Kurthet e dritës ("Traps of Light") (1997)
- Triumfi i Gjergj Elez Alisë ("The Triumph of Gjergj Elez Alia") (1999)
- Stina e ujkut ("Season of the Wolf") (2000) ISBN 9992741414
- Të lirë dhe të burgosur ("The Free and the Imprisoned") (2001)
- Triumfi i dytë i Gjergj Elez Alisë ("The Second Triumph of Gjergj Elez Alia") (2003) ISBN 9951080057
- Email (2003)
- Kumte dashurie ("Love messages")(2004) ISBN 9992750855
- Sesilja ose sexonix (2005) ISBN 9994377841
- Franc Kafka i shkruan të birit ("Franz Kafka writes to his Son") (2007) ISBN 9994311859
- Stina e maceve ("The Season of the Cats)(2006) ISBN 9951080642
- Kanuni i Lekës së vogël ("The Kanun of Leka Junior") (2011) ISBN 9951081487
- Legjenda e vetmisë ("The Legend of Solitude") (2012) ISBN 9951417787
- Gjumi mbi borë ("Sleeping on Snow") (2016) ISBN 9928435456
- Treni i muzgut ("The Twilight Train") (2017)
- Dashuritë e virgjëreshës Madalenë ("Virgin Madeleine's Love") (2018)
