= Frashër Assembly (1880) =

The Second Assembly of Frashër was one of the regional assemblies organized by the League of Prizren. It was held in Frashër in June 1880. It was attended by representatives of settlements with Albanian population which administratively were part of the vilayets of Ioannina and Manastir. The assembly had as central goal addressing the risk of partition of lands with Albanian populations among neighbouring countries. Among other things, the participants agreed on a proposal to form a central national government which would be formed by the General Assembly of the League of Prizren.

== See also ==
- Congress of Dibra
- Congress of Manastir
