= Kristo Frashëri =

Albanian historian

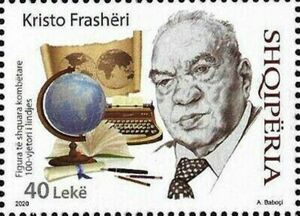
Postage Stamp Dedicated to Kristo Frashëri

Kristo Frashëri (Istanbul, December 4, 1920 – Tirana, January 31, 2016) was a prominent Albanian historian and participant in the Albanian National Liberation War.

Born in Istanbul as the first son of the patriot and National Awakening figure Anastas Frashëri and Evdhoksia Tole-Ogreni, and thus descended from one of the prominent branches of the Frashëri family. He was baptized at the Church of the Holy Trinity in the Fener district of Istanbul, with his godfather being Dhimitër Noli, the brother of former Prime Minister and Bishop of the Albanian Orthodox Churc Fan Noli.

In 1940, he became a member of the Communist Youth of Albania, a fact later mentioned in a 1964 "study of anti-party groups" by the Albanian Secret Police Sigurimi. On April 19, 1943, he was considered as an underground activist.

Kristo Frashëri had a prolific academic career spanning over 70 years. Since his first publication in 1938 on Jeronim de Rada, he authored dozens of historical articles, studies, and monographs focusing on key events, figures, and processes in Albanian history.

His work covered topics such as medieval Albania, the Ottoman period, the Albanian National Awakening, and the creation of the modern Albanian state. Notable post-1990 publications include The League of Prizren (1878–1881), Gjergj Kastrioti Skanderbeg: Life and Work, History of Tirana, and The Declaration of Albanian Independence (1912).
