= Tekke of Frashër =

Bektashi tekke in Frashër, Albania

- Teqeja e Frashërit
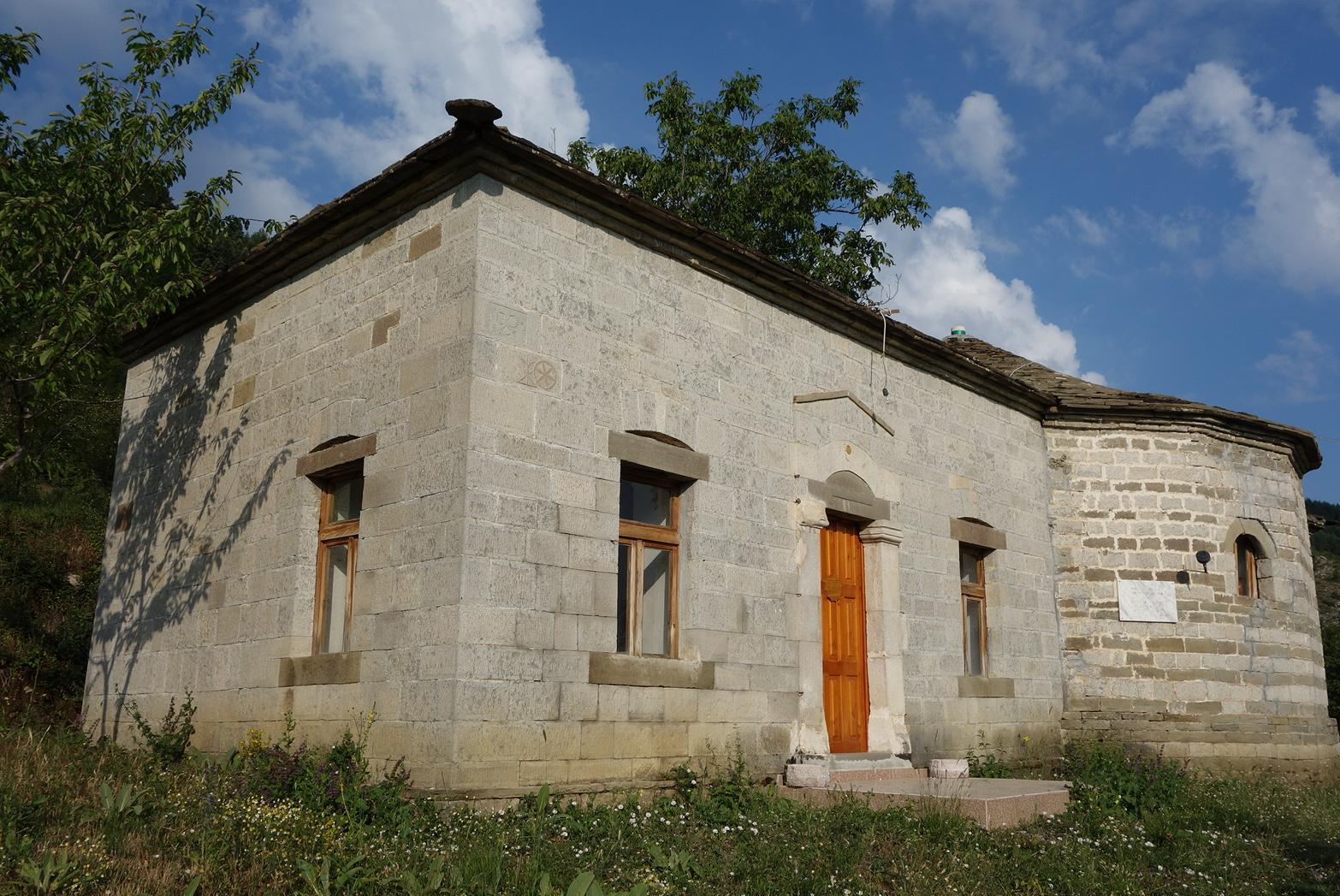
- The tekke, in 2013

- Location of the tekke in Albania

Religion
- Affiliation: Sunni Islam
- Sect: Sufism
- Rite: Bektashi
- Festival: 5 September
- Ecclesiastical or organizational status: Tekke
- Status: Active

Location
- Location: Frashër
- Country: Albania
- Interactive map of Tekke of Frashër
- Coordinates: 40°21′36″N 20°25′43″E

Architecture
- Type: Islamic architecture
- Style: Ottoman
- Completed: 1781 CE

Cultural Monument of Albania
- Official name: Tekke of Frashër

The Tekke of Frashër (Albanian: Teqeja e Frashërit), also known as the Nasibî Tâhir Baba Tekke, is a Bektashi shrine and Albanian Bektashi tekke, located in Frashër, Gjirokastër County in southern Albania. The tekke was founded in 1781 and was designated as a Cultural Monument of Albania in 1973.

The tekke was crucial to the Albanian National Awakening, particularly in the nationalist movements of the late 19th century, and it was one of the wealthiest and revered tekkes in Albania.

== History ==
Takyas (or tekkes in Turkish) were centers of Islamic mysticism and theology which provided a popular alternative to normative Islam.

The tekke was founded at the time of Ali Pasha Tepelena. Nasibi Tahir Babai, a local poet and mystic, founded the tekke in either 1815 or 1825 upon his return from his travels in the Middle East. After his death in 1835 - upon which a tyrbe was constructed in his honour and subsequently became an important pilgrimage site - his son Jusuf Skënderasi took over. The tekke became well known in Southern Albania. During the era of Baba Alushi (1846-1902), the tekke would become not only a center of Sufi mysticism, but also a stronghold of Albanian nationalism. It would affect also the work of future figures of the Albanian National Awakening Şemseddin Sami Frashëri, and his brothers Naim and Abdyl. On 30 May 1878, the Albanian Committee of Janina held a meeting led by Baba Alushi and Abdyl Frashëri, as a countermeasure for the decisions of the Treaty of San Stefano. The meeting came out with several demands towards the Great Powers, which would serve as basis for the soon-to-come League of Prizren. The tekke served as a headquarters during the League's existence (1878-1881) and many follow up meetings were held there.

During this period, the tekke served as a centre for the distribution of Albanian-language books (which was outlawed by the Ottoman Empire) and aided in spreading Albanian nationalist sentiment throughout the country, particularly during the leadership of Baba Alush. Baba Alush was followed by Baba Hysejn and Baba Zejnel Abedin (died in 1913) from Backa in the region of Skrapar; Baba Zejnel even gave refuge to Albanian freedom fighter Mihal Grameno and his fighters, dressing them up as dervish novices to disguise them from Ottoman Turkish troops who raided the tekke. During his stay, Grameno recorded that the tekke was superbly clean and orderly under the leadership of Baba Zejnel Abedin, who was described to be a true holy man who worked to help the poor. Both Muslims and Christians deeply respected Baba Abedin, and the 15-16 dervishes who served under him were also well-educated patriots who were crucial to the Albanian National Awakening by functioning as emissaries and preachers of Albanian national sentiment.

During 1909–1910, the tekke contributed in spreading the Albanian schools and education in the area, and had about twenty dervishes prior to the World War I. It was destroyed by the Greek forces of Zografos in June 1914. It was reconstructed with the contribution of Albanian-Americans in 1923. At the First National Congress of the Bektashi, held on 14–17 January 1921 in the Teqe of Prishta in the Skrapar region, the tekke of Frashër was represented by Baba Mustafa. When the Albanian Bektashi Order was reformed in 1930, Frashër became one of the six new Bektashi administrative districts of Albania (called a gjyshata). Gjysh Mustafa Qerezi functioned as the leader from 1930 to 1933, followed by Gjysh Murat in 1934–1941. After World War II and the Communist takeover of Albania, the baba of the tekke - Baba Mehmet Zykaj - was arrested and thereby imprisoned for nearly 15 years until his death in 1959. Frashër became the Bektashi center for Përmet area in 1942, seat of the prefecture of Vlora in 1945 and then the sub-prefecture of Berat, but lost its status as a Gjyshata in around 1950. It was a Gjyshatë Nderi (Honorific Gjyshatë) in 1962.

During the prohibition of religions from 1967 to 1991 in Communist Albania it stopped functioning, but was not destroyed due to being strongly associated with the patriotic deeds of Abdyl Frashëri and the League of Prizren. The tekke was restored in 1995 and has a feast day on the fifth of September.

== Clerics ==
The tekke was administered by the following babas.

Order	Name	Term begin	Term end	Years in office	Notes
1	Baba Tahir Nasibi Skënderasi	1815	1835	19–20 years	
2	Jusuf Skënderasi	1835	1846	10–11 years	
3	Baba Alushi	1846	1902	55–56 years	
4	Baba Abedini Ibro	1903	1913	9–10 years	
5	Baba Sheme	1913	1929	15–16 years	
6	Baba Mustafa Qerezi	1930	1933	2–3 years	
7	Baba Murati	1934	1941	6–7 years	
8	Baba Abaz Hilmi	1942	1945	2–3 years	
9	Baba Mehmet Zykaj	1945	1959	13–14 years	
10	Baba Dervish Xhemal Shkëmbi	1960	1967	6–7 years	
11	Përparim Skënderasi	1995	unknown		administrator

== See also ==
- Islam in Albania
- List of Religious Cultural Monuments of Albania
