= Xhanfize Frashëri =

Albanian physician

Xhanfize Frashëri (1912–1971) was an Albanian physician.

She took her medical degree in Philadelphia in the US. She specialized in pediatrics. She returned to Tirana in Albania on 27 September 1937, becoming the first female physician in Albania. She opened her own clinic in Tirana, a private clinic specializing in pediatrics and gynecology.
