= Bastar i Mesëm =

- Village
- Location within Albania
- Coordinates: 41°26′N 19°58′E
- Country: Albania
- County: Tirana
- Municipality: Tirana
- Administrative unit: Zall-Bastar
- Time zone: UTC+1 (CET)
  - Summer (DST): UTC+2 (CEST)

Bastar i Mesëm is a village in the former municipality of Zall-Bastar in Tirana County, Albania. At the 2015 local government reform it became part of the municipality Tirana.

== Demographic history ==
the village of Bastari appears in the Ottoman defter of 1467 as a part of the timar of Mustafa in the nahiyah of Benda. It was a relatively small settlement with a total of only five households which were represented by: Miho Manesi, Gjon Guribardi, Gjergj Shurbi, Kola Zhari, and Dom Miho.
