= Bayt (poetry) =

Line or couplet in Asian poetry

A bayt (Note: Also anglicized as bait, beit, beyt.) (Arabic: بَيْت, romanized: bayt, pronounced [bajt], lit. 'a house') is a metrical unit of Arabic, Azerbaijani, Ottoman, Persian, Punjabi, Sindhi and Urdu poetry.

In Arabic poetry, a bayt corresponds to a single line divided into two hemistichs of equal length, each containing two, three or four feet, or from 16 to 32 syllables. In Persian, Turkic and Urdu poetry, the word bayt has come to refer to two lines (like a couplet, although the two lines of a Persian, Turkic or Urdu bayt do not have to rhyme).

William Alexander Clouston concluded that this fundamental part of Arabic prosody originated with the Bedouins or Arabs of the desert, as, in the nomenclature of the different parts of the line, one foot is called "a tent-pole", another "tent-peg" and the two hemistichs of the verse are called after the folds or leaves of the double-door of the tent or "house".

Through Ottoman Turkish, it got into Albanian as bejte and the bards of Muslim tradition in the Albanian literature took their name after this metrical unit, the poets known as bejtexhinj, literally meaning "couplet makers".
