= Bejtexhi =

Poet of the Muslim tradition in 18th-century Albania

A bejtexhi (Albanian: [bɛjtɛˈdʒi], lit. 'couplet maker'; (Note: A compound of bejte (from Turkish beyit 'couplet', from Arabic بَيْت bayt) and -xhi (from Turkish -ci, occupational suffix).) plural: bejtexhinj [bɛjtɛˈdʒiɲ]) was a popular bard of the Muslim tradition in Ottoman Albania. The genre of literature created by bejtexhinj in the 18th century prevailed in different cities of what is now Albania, Kosovo, Chameria as well as in religious centers.

The spread of the bejtexhinj was a product of two different significant factors. One factor was a demand in religious practices to write in Albanian and to free it from foreign influence. The other factor was the accretion of ideological pressure from Turkish rulers. The ruling Ottomans sought the submission of Albanians through the Muslim religion and culture. Albania rulers opened their own schools with many bejtexhinj in attendance.

== History ==
As Albanian writers under Ottoman rule began using their own language instead of Turkish, Persian, or Arabic, they produced works known as Bejtexhi poetry. This shift, which started in the early 18th century, was a major cultural milestone comparable to the earlier transition from Latin to Albanian that had established Albania’s first literary tradition. The Bejtexhinj era of Albanian letters produced almost exclusively poetry written with the Arabic alphabet—an imperfect tool that struggled to capture the complexities of Albanian sounds just as it had failed to fit Ottoman Turkish. Their Albanian was heavily saturated with Turkish, Arabic, and Persian terms, to the point that modern Albanian readers often need dictionaries, while a reader of classical Turkish might grasp more of the vocabulary. These foreign elements entered the language both to articulate the concepts of a newly adopted religion and culture and to make it easier for poets to compose within the established metrical and rhyming conventions of Ottoman, Persian, and Arabic verse.

Stylistically, Bejtexhinj poetry echoed the dominant literary traditions of Istanbul and the broader Islamic world. Albanian poets adopted the same genres — quatrains, devotional hymns, long laudatory odes, and love-themed ghazals — mostly using syllabic metres and only occasionally experimenting with quantitative ones. Their themes ranged widely within an Islamic frame: didactic or contemplative religious pieces, mystical reflections inspired by Sunni, Shi‘ite Sufi, or Bektashi thought, alongside a smaller body of worldly poems on love, nature, history, and philosophical musings. Most works from this period survive only in scattered manuscripts, many lost, privately held, or only preserved in late copies stored in archives. With so few editions available, the Bejtexhinj corpus remains one of the most obscure and least explored segments of Albanian literary history.

== Notable Bejtexhinj ==
Notable poets of the Bejtexhi genre include:

- Nezim Frakulla
- Sulejman Naibi
- Hasan Zyko Kamberi
- Zenel Bastari
- Muhamet Kyçyku (Çami)
- Dalip Frashëri
- Shahin Frashëri
- Dervish Hasani, from Krusha e Vogel near Rahovec, lived towards the end of the 17th century. He is the author of the oldest Albanian verse in Arabic script to have been written in Kosovo.
- Tahir Efendi Gjakova
- Sulejman Temani
- Haxhi Ymer Kashari wrote religious poetry in Albanian and Turkish. His Albanian verse constitutes the oldest document in the Tirana dialect
- Mulla Beqiri was an 18th-century poet and mufti of the Vushtrri medrese
- Omer effendi Saddedin was a poet from southern Albania
- Ismail Pasha Velabishti, Nezim Frakulla's patron from Berat, who was murdered on 3 August 1764 in Vlorë, wrote an octosyllabic poem during his time as commander of the fortress of Lepanto in which he expresses his desire to return home
- Ibrahim Elbasani
- Sulejman Pasha Vërlaci, also known as Sulejman Pasha Elbasani
- Mulla Salih Pata wrote in the second half of the 18th century at the court of the Bushati family. 2 of satirical poems were dedicated to Kara Mahmud Pasha
- Mulla Hysen Dobraçi, also at the court of the Bushati family, wrote poetry celebrating Albanian resistance to the Ottomans
- Elmaz Gjirokastriti wrote a ninety-two-line poem bearing the Turkish title Evvel hastalik (The first disease), which concerned with the epidemic that hit the Gjirokaster area in 1817
- Et'hem bey Mollaj
- Baba Abdullah Melçani
- Hysen Bitri from Krujë
- Asllan Bej Puçe was the son of Ago Myhyrdari, a secretary to Ali Pasha of Ioannina
- Abdullah Sulejman Konispoli who wrote a mevlud in the Cham Albanian dialect
- Ismail Floqi from Korçë
- Jonuz efendi Sabriu
- Nasibi Tahir Babai
- Mulla Fejzo Abdalli from Gjirokastër
- Demir Vlonjati
- Mulla Dervish Peja
- Muçi Zade
