= Nezim Frakulla =

Albanian poet

Nezim Berati (ca. 1680–1760), alternatively known as Nezim Frakulla or Ibrahim Nezimi, was the first major poet among the Bejtexhinj, popular poets in the Muslim tradition who wrote in Albanian but used Arabic script. He was born in the village of Frakull near Fier in modern-day western Albania and lived part of his life in Berat. Frakulla studied in Istanbul where he wrote his first poetry in Turkish, Persian and perhaps Arabic, including two divans. About 1731, he returned to Berat where he is known to have been involved in literary rivalry with other poets of the period, notably with Imam Ali, mufti of Berat. Between 1731 and 1735 he composed a divan and various other poetry in Albanian, including an Albanian-Turkish mini-dictionary in verse form. Although we do not possess the whole of the original divan, we do have copies of ca. 110 poems from it. Some of his verse was put to music and survived the centuries orally. Nezim Frakulla asserts that he was the first person to compose a divan in Albanian.

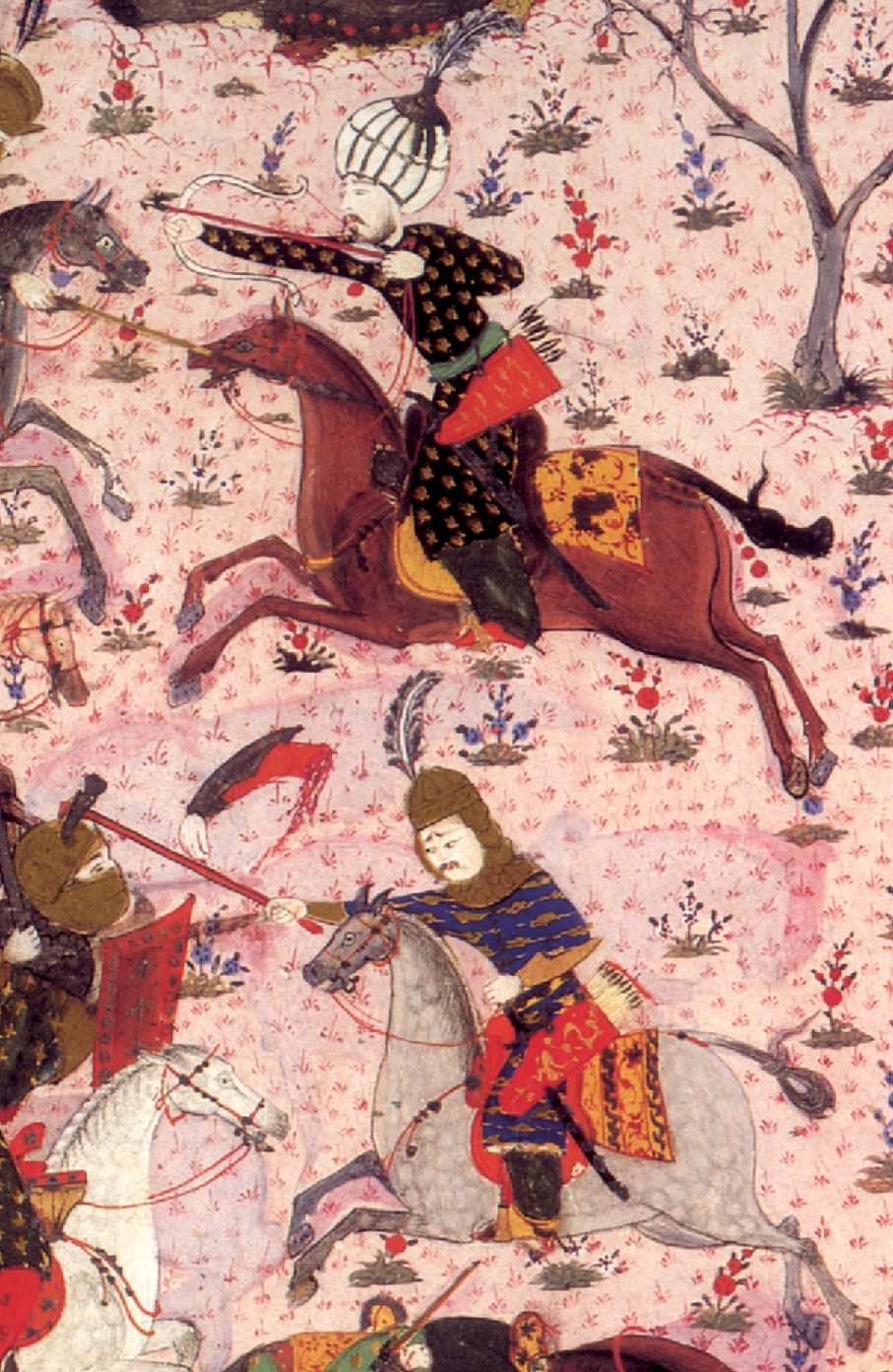
The poems of Nezim Frakulla, derived from Sufi thought and reflected various traditions upheld during the Ottoman era.

Frakulla's divan includes verse ranging from panegyrics on local Pashas and military campaigns, to odes on friends and patrons, poems on separation from and longing for his friends and lovers, descriptions of nature in the springtime, religious verse and, in particular, love lyrics. The imagery of the latter ghazal, some of which are devoted to his nephew, is that of Arabic, Persian and Turkish poetry with many of the classical themes, metaphors and allusions.

== See also ==
- Albanian literature
- Culture of Albania
