= Frashër =

- Administrative unit
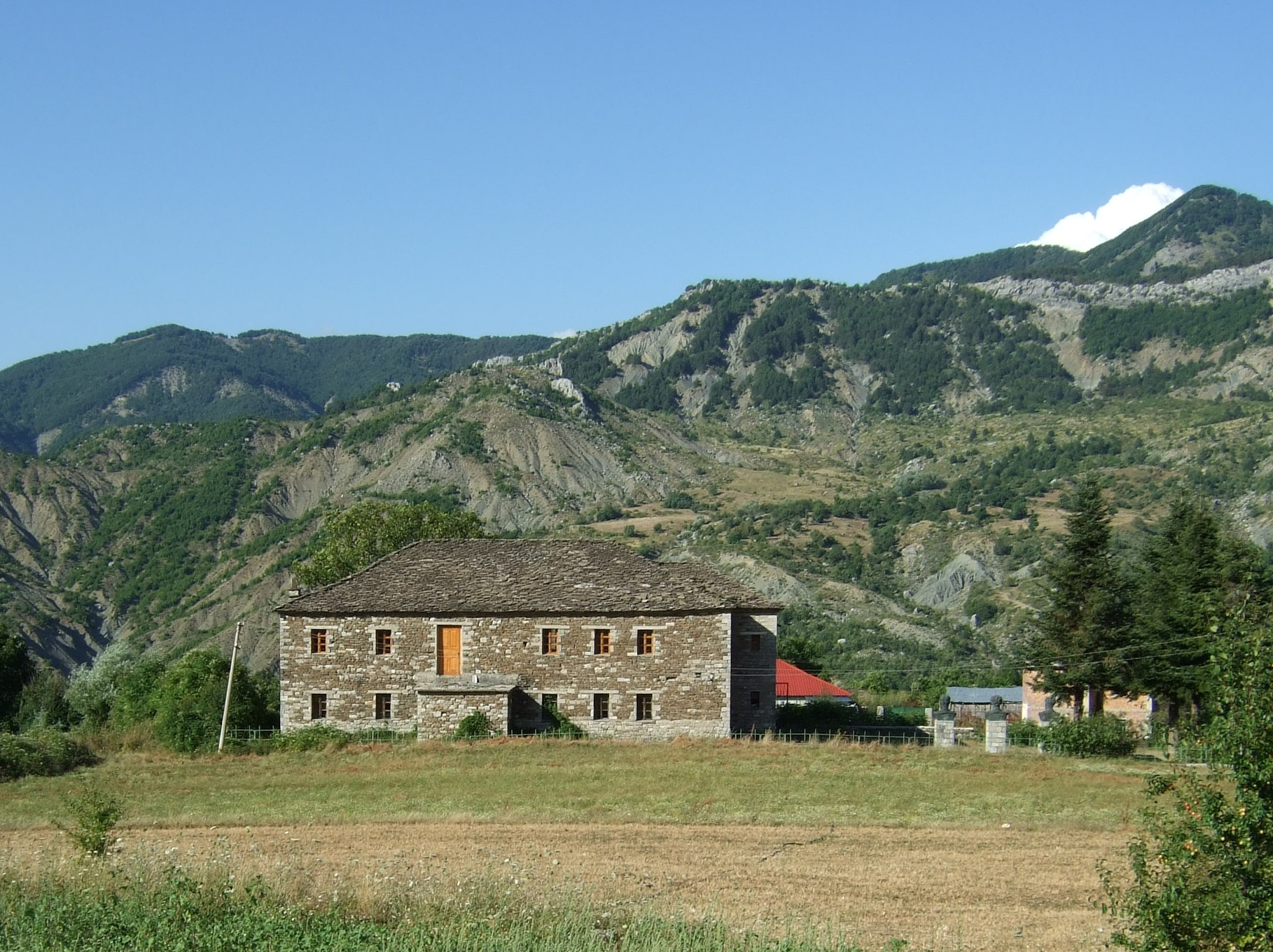
- Museum of Frashëri brothers

- Location within Albania
- Coordinates: 40°22′N 20°26′E
- Country: Albania
- County: Gjirokastër
- Municipality: Përmet

Population (2011)
  - Administrative unit: 387
- Time zone: UTC+1 (CET)
  - Summer (DST): UTC+2 (CEST)

Frashër (Albanian: [ˈfɾaʃəɾ]; Albanian definite form: Frashëri; Aromanian: Farshar) is a village and a former municipality in the Gjirokastër County, southern Albania. At the 2015 local government reform it became a subdivision of the municipality Përmet. The population at the 2011 census was 387. The municipal unit consists of the villages Frashër, Zavalan, Ogren-Kostrec, Gostivisht, Miçan, Vërçisht, Kreshovë and Soropull.

Frashër is known for the prominent intellectuals it has produced - especially in the 19th and early 20th centuries.

== Name ==
The name of the settlement means 'ash tree' in Albanian. The word frashër (Gheg Albanian: frashën) was borrowed from Vulgar Latin (cf. Latin fraxinus). The settlement was founded after the Roman period of the Albanian language. It is said that the Frashër area was covered with ash forests, which disappeared over time. The Aromanian name of the settlement is Farshar.

== History ==
The first documented attestation of Frashëri probably comes in the form of an Albanian merchant from Frashër who had traveled to Thessaloniki in 1330.

The Frashër area in the Middle Ages was the source of several waves of migrations of Aromanians throughout the southern and central Balkans. The Aromanian dialect of the area of Frashër is known as fãrsherot, being the dialect of one of the main subgroups of the Aromanians, the Farsherots.

In 1432 the village was documented as Fracili in the Ottoman defter of the sanjak of Korçë-Përmet. The defter documented six households in Frashër at the time. The next defter to document Frashër is that of 1504. The village had 41 households, 40 of whom were Christian. The heads of households from which the major vëllazëri (brotherhoods) of Frashër would form in the 17th century include Dedë Duka, Dukë Kryeziu, Uk Deda, Gjon Deda, Martin Bardhi, Deskë Gjini, Dedë Gjini, Kozma Shurbi, Kolë Shurbi, Bendo Shurbi, Gjon Gjoni, Llazër Gjoni and others.

In June 1880 the Second Assembly of Frashër was organised by the League of Prizren.

Ottoman Albanian Sipahis and landowners from nineteenth century Frashër owned estate properties (chiflik) in parts of the Balkans and in particular the Thessalian plain, until its loss to Greece in 1881 leading to local economic decline and increasing reliance on agriculture. In 1914 the Tekke of Frashër, a 133 year-old Bektashi shrine and a center of Albanian Nationalism in the area, was destroyed by the Greek rebels of Georgios Christakis-Zografos, but was reconstructed with the contribution of Albanian-Americans in 1923.

== Notable people ==
- Dalip Frashëri, 19th-century poet.
- Shahin Frashëri, 19th-century poet.
- Abdyl Frashëri, Albanian politician and national hero.
- Naim Frashëri, Albanian national poet and national hero.
- Sami Frashëri, Albanian writer and national hero.
- Mid'hat Frashëri, Albanian politician, diplomat and intellectual.
- Mihal Zallari, Chairman of the assembly of Albania, historian and journalist.
- Fehim Zavalani, Albanian journalist.
- Mehdi Frashëri, Prime Minister of Albania.
- Ali Sami Yen, son of Sami Frashëri, founder of Turkish football club Galatasaray.

== Bibliography ==
- Demiraj, Shaban (2006). The origin of the Albanians: linguistically investigated. Academy of Sciences of Albania. ISBN 9789994381715. Archived from the original on 20 November 2020.
- Frashëri, Alfred; Frashëri, Neki (2014). Frashëri në historinë e Shqipërisë. Dudaj. ISBN 978-99943-0-051-8.
