= Hasan Zyko Kamberi =

Albanian poet

Hasan Zyko Kamberi was an Albanian poet of the Bejtexhi genre.

== Life ==
Kamberi was born in the second half of the 18th century in Starje, a village at the foot of Mount Gramos. The only event known about his life is his participation in the Battle of Smederevo in 1789, as part of an army led by Ali Pasha of Ioannina. He was a dervish, a Bektashi clergyman, and died in Starje in the early 19th century. His tomb there was turned into a shrine which continues to exist to this day, and is known locally as the turbeh of Baba Hasani.

== Poetry ==
Kamberi is one of the most well-known representatives of the Muslim tradition in Albanian literature. He was part of the Bejtexhi, a Muslim Albanian literary movement strongly influenced by Turkish, Arabic and Persian literature. His main work, a 200-page mexhmua (verse collection), is lost. A manuscript of it is believed to have been sent to Monastir (Bitola) sometime in the 1908-1910 period to be published, but what happened with it is unclear. Surviving works of Kamberi include over fifty secular poems, about ten ilâhî, and a short mevlud. The latter is the first Albanian mevlud, and was written in Arabic script.

Kamberi also wrote secular poetry. In his octosyllabic Sefer-i hümâyûn (The king’s campaign) in thirty-three quatrains, he describes his participation in the Battle of Smederevo and the suffering it caused. In Bahti im (My fortune) and Vasijetnameja (The testament), he elaborates on his own misfortunes. Gjerdeku (The bridal chamber) elaborated on contemporary marriage customs. It takes concern with the hardship of young women married off to husbands their families choose for them, and the hardship of young men forced to go abroad to make a living. However, the most famous of his poems is Paraja (Money). It is a satirical treatment of feudal corruption prevailing at the time.

== See also ==
- Albanian literature
