= Naim Frashëri =

Albanian poet, writer and activist (1846–1900)

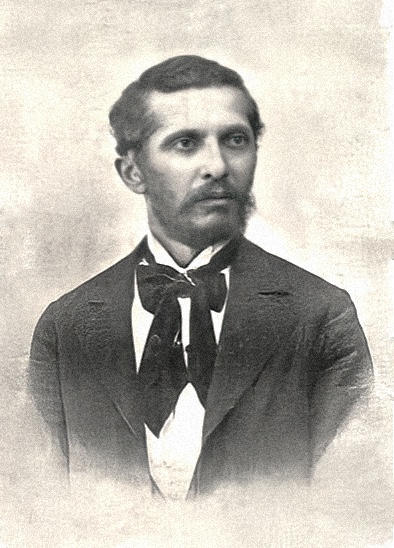
- Born: 25 May 1846; Frashër, Yanina Vilayet, Ottoman Empire (modern Albania)
- Died: 20 October 1900 (aged 54); Kadıköy, Constantinople, Ottoman Empire (modern Istanbul, Turkey)
- Education: Zosimaia School
- Occupations: Educator; historian; journalist; poet; politician; translator; writer
- Relatives: Abdyl Frashëri (brother); Sami Frashëri (brother); Mid'hat Frashëri (nephew); Ali Sami Yen (nephew)
- Writing career
- Language: Albanian; Ottoman Turkish; Persian; Arabic; Ancient Greek; Modern Greek; French; Italian
- Genre: Romanticism
- Movement: Albanian Renaissance

Naim bey Frashëri, more commonly Naim Frashëri (pronounced [naˈim ˈfɾaʃəɾi]; 25 May 1846 – 20 October 1900), was an Albanian historian, journalist, poet, translator, and one of the most prominent figures of the Albanian National Awakening. Regarded as a pioneer of modern Albanian literature and one of the most influential Albanian cultural icons of the 19th century, he was proclaimed as the national poet of Albania.

Frashëri's works explored themes such as freedom, humanity, unity, tolerance and revolution. His twenty-two works consist of fifteen works written in Albanian as well as four in Turkish, two in Greek and one in Persian. He is considered to be the most representative writer of Sufi poetry in Albanian, and having been under the influence of his uncle Dalip Frashëri, he reflected a mingling of Sufism with Western philosophy in his poetical ideals. He had an extraordinarily profound impact on Albanian literature and society during the 20th century, most notably on Asdreni, Gjergj Fishta and Lasgush Poradeci, among many others.

Ti Shqipëri, më jep nder, më jep emrin Shqipëtar ("You Albania, you give me honour, you give me the name Albanian"), a memorable line in his poem O malet e Shqipërisë, has been designated as the national motto of Albania. It speaks to unity and freedom and it embodies in its words a sense of pride towards the country and people.

== Life ==
=== Family ===
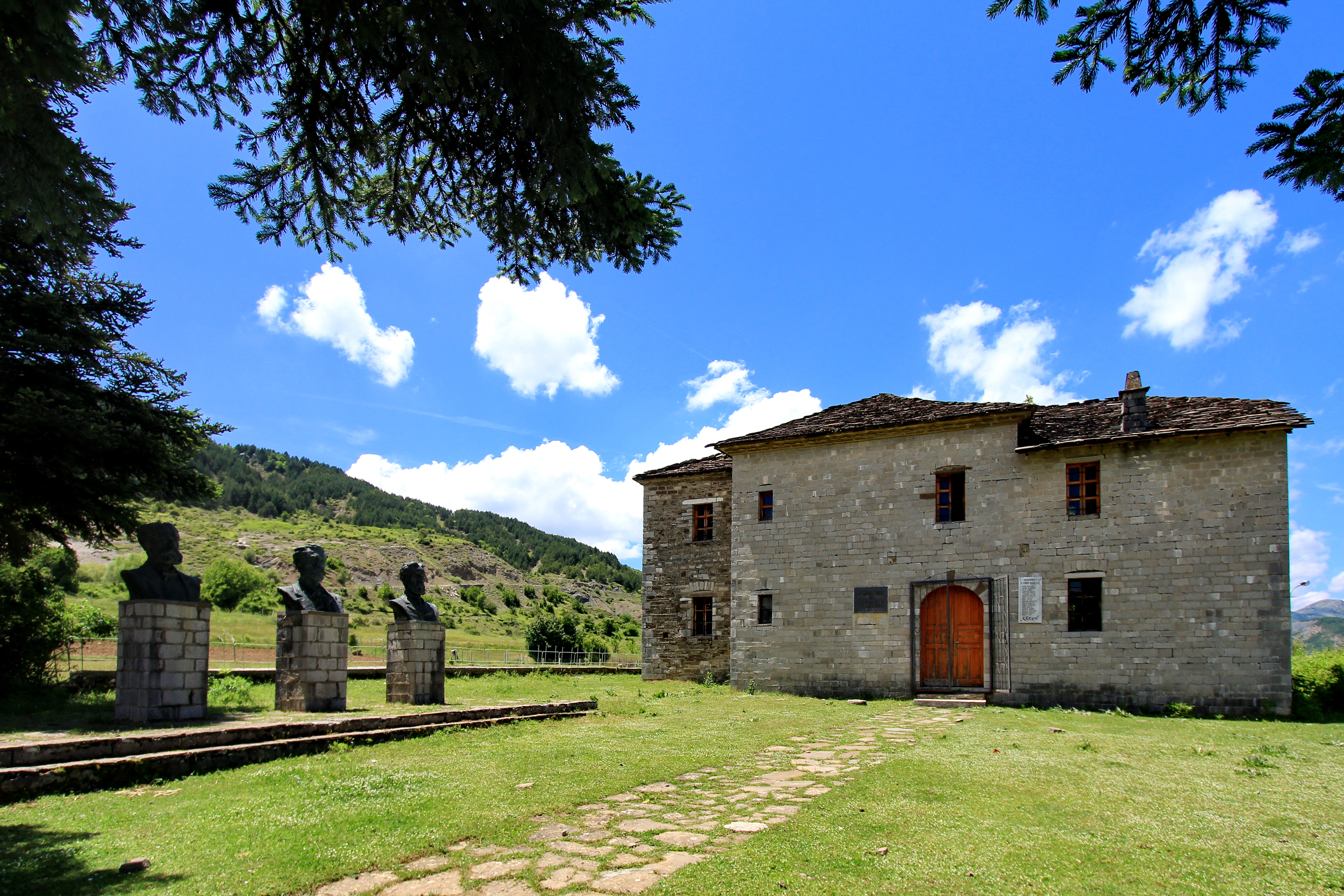
The family house of Naim Frashëri in Frashër.

Naim Frashëri was born on 25 May 1846 into a wealthy Albanian family of religious belief affiliated with the Bektashi tariqa of Islam, in the village of Frashër in what was then part of the Ottoman Empire and now Albania. He, Abdyl and Sami were one of eight children of Halid Frashëri (1797–1859), a landowner and military commander and Emine (1814–1861). Halid belonged to the Dakollari branch of the Frashëri family. They were descendants of Ajaz Bey from Gramsh who in 1650–60 was given the command of Frashër. Ajaz Bey's grandfather, Hamza Bey had lost his lands in Tomorrica in 1570 when he rebelled and was exiled but the family's fortunes changed with the rise of Köprülü Mehmed Pasha who intervened on their behalf and they were pardoned. Emine came from the family of Iljaz Bej Mirahori from the region around Korçë that traced its ancestry back to the 15th century.

Naim and his brothers Abdyl and Sami were born and raised in the village of Frashër at the southern slopes of the Tomorr Mountains. He became acquainted with numerous cultures and languages such as Arabic, Ancient and Modern Greek, French, Italian, Ottoman Turkish and Persian. He was one of the few men to whom the literary culture of the Occident and Orient was equally familiar and valuable.

Upon the death of his father, he and his family settled to Ioannina where he earned initial inspiration for his future poetries written in the lyric and romantic style. After he suffered a severe lung infection, due to his congenital tuberculosis, in Constantinople, he joined his brother Abdyl in the fight for national freedom and consciousness of the Albanian people during the Albanian Renaissance in which he later became the most distinguished representative of that period.

=== Education ===
His religion paved the way for many of his future accomplishments.

In the Tekke of Frashër, he received lessons in all the common subjects of his time especially in languages such as Arabic, Ottoman Turkish and Persian. As a member of a family which gave him a strong Bektashi upbringing, he spent a part of his time in a Bektashi tekke. After the death of their parents, the family moved to Ioannina in 1865. The eldest brother, Abdyl (b. 1839), became the family head at the age of 22 and started working as a merchant. That year Naim and Sami enrolled in the Zosimaia secondary school. The education there provided Naim with the basics of a classical education along Western lines. Apart from languages he learned in the Zosiamaia (Ancient and Modern Greek, French and Italian), Naim took private lessons in Persian, Turkish and Arabic from two important local Bektashi.

After he finished his studies in 1870, Frashëri worked for a few months at the press office in Istanbul (1870) but was forced to return to his home village because of tuberculosis. The climate of Frashër helped Naim and soon he started work in the Ottoman bureaucracy as a clerk in Berat and later in Saranda (1872–1877). However, in 1876 Frashëri left the job and went to Baden, in modern Austria to cure his problems with rheumatism in a health resort.

=== Politics ===
In 1879, along with his brother Sami and 25 other Albanians, Naim Frashëri founded and was a member of the Society for the Publication of Albanian Writings in Istanbul that promoted Albanian language publications. Ottoman authorities forbid writing in Albanian in 1885 which resulted in publications being published abroad and Frashëri used his initials N.H.F. to bypass those restrictions for his works. Later on, Albanian schools were established in 1887 in Southeastern Albania.

An Albanian magazine, Drita, appeared in 1884 under the editorship of Petro Poga and later Pandeli Sotiri with Naim Frashëri being a behind-the-scenes editor as it was not allowed by Ottoman authorities to write in Albanian at that time. Naim Frashëri and other Albanian writers like his brother Sami Frashëri would write using pseudonyms in Poga's publication. Due to a lack of education material Naim Frashëri, his brother Sami and several other Albanians wrote textbooks in the Albanian language during the late 1880s for the Albanian school in Korçë. In a letter to Faik Konitza in 1887, Frashëri expressed sentiments regarding the precarious state of the Ottoman Empire that the best outcome for Albanians was a future annexation of all of Albania by Austria-Hungary.

In 1900 Naim Frashëri died in Istanbul. During the 1950s the Turkish government allowed for his remains to be sent and reburied in Albania.

== Career ==
=== Works ===
"Oh mountains of Albania
and you, oh trees so lofty,
Broad plains with all your flowers,
day and night I contemplate you,
You highlands so exquisite,
and you streams and rivers sparkling,
Oh peaks and promontories,
and you slopes, cliffs, verdant forests,
Of the herds and flocks
I'll sing out which you hold
and which you nourish.
Oh you blessed, sacred places,
you inspire and delight me!
You, Albania, give me honor,
and you name me as Albanian,
And my heart you have replenished
both with ardour and desire.
Albania! Oh my mother!
Though in exile I am longing,
My heart has ne'er forgotten
all the love you've given to me ..."

— Oh mountains of Albania
from Bagëti e Bujqësi

With its literary stature and the broad range of both stylistic and thematic content, Frashëri significantly contributed to the development of the modern Albanian literary language. The importance of his works lies less in his creative expression than in the social and political intention of his poetry and faith. His works were noted by the desire for the emergence of an independent Albanian unity that overcomes denominational and territorial differences, and by an optimistic belief in civilization and the political, economic and cultural rise of the Albanian people.

In his poem Bagëti e Bujqësi, Frashëri idyllically describes the natural and cultural beauty of Albania and the modest life of its people where nothing infringes on mystical euphoria and all conflicts find reconciliation and fascination.

Frashëri saw his liberal religion as a profound source for Albanian libration, tolerance and national awareness among his religiously divided people. He, therefore, composed his theological Fletore e Bektashinjet which is now a piece of national importance. It contains an introductory profession of his faith and ten spiritual poems granting a contemporary perspective into the beliefs of the sect.

1. Kavâid-i farisiyye dar tarz-i nevîn (Grammar of the Persian language according to the new method), Istanbul, 1871.
2. Ihtiraat ve kessfiyyat (Inventions and Discoveries), Istanbul, 1881.
3. Fusuli erbea (Four Seasons), Istanbul, 1884.
4. Tahayyülat (Dreams), Istanbul, 1884.
5. Bagëti e Bujqësi (Herds and Crops), Bucharest, 1886.
6. E këndimit çunavet (Reader for Boys), Bucharest, 1886.
7. Istori e përgjithshme për mësonjëtoret të para (General history for the first grades), Bucharest, 1886.
8. Vjersha për mësonjëtoret të para (Poetry for the first grades), Bucharest, 1886.
9. Dituritë për mësonjëtoret të para (General knowledge for the first grades), Bucharest, 1886.
10. O alithis pothos ton Skypetaron (The True Desire of Albanians, Greek: Ο αληθής πόθος των Σκιπετάρων), Bucharest, 1886.
11. Luletë e Verësë (Flowers of the Summer), Bucharest, 1890.
12. Mësime (Lessons), Bucharest, 1894.
13. Parajsa dhe fjala fluturake (Paradise and the Flying Word), Bucharest, 1894.
14. Gjithësia (Omneity), Bucharest, 1895.
15. Fletore e bektashinjët (The Bektashi Notebook), Bucharest, 1895.
16. O eros (Love, Greek: Ο Έρως), Istanbul, 1895.
17. Iliadh' e Omirit, (Homer's Iliad), Bucharest, 1896.
18. Histori e Skënderbeut (History of Skanderbeg), Bucharest, 1898.
19. Qerbelaja (Qerbela), Bucharest, 1898.
20. Istori e Shqipërisë (History of Albania), Sofia, 1899.
21. Shqipëria (Albania), Sofia, 1902.

=== Legacy ===
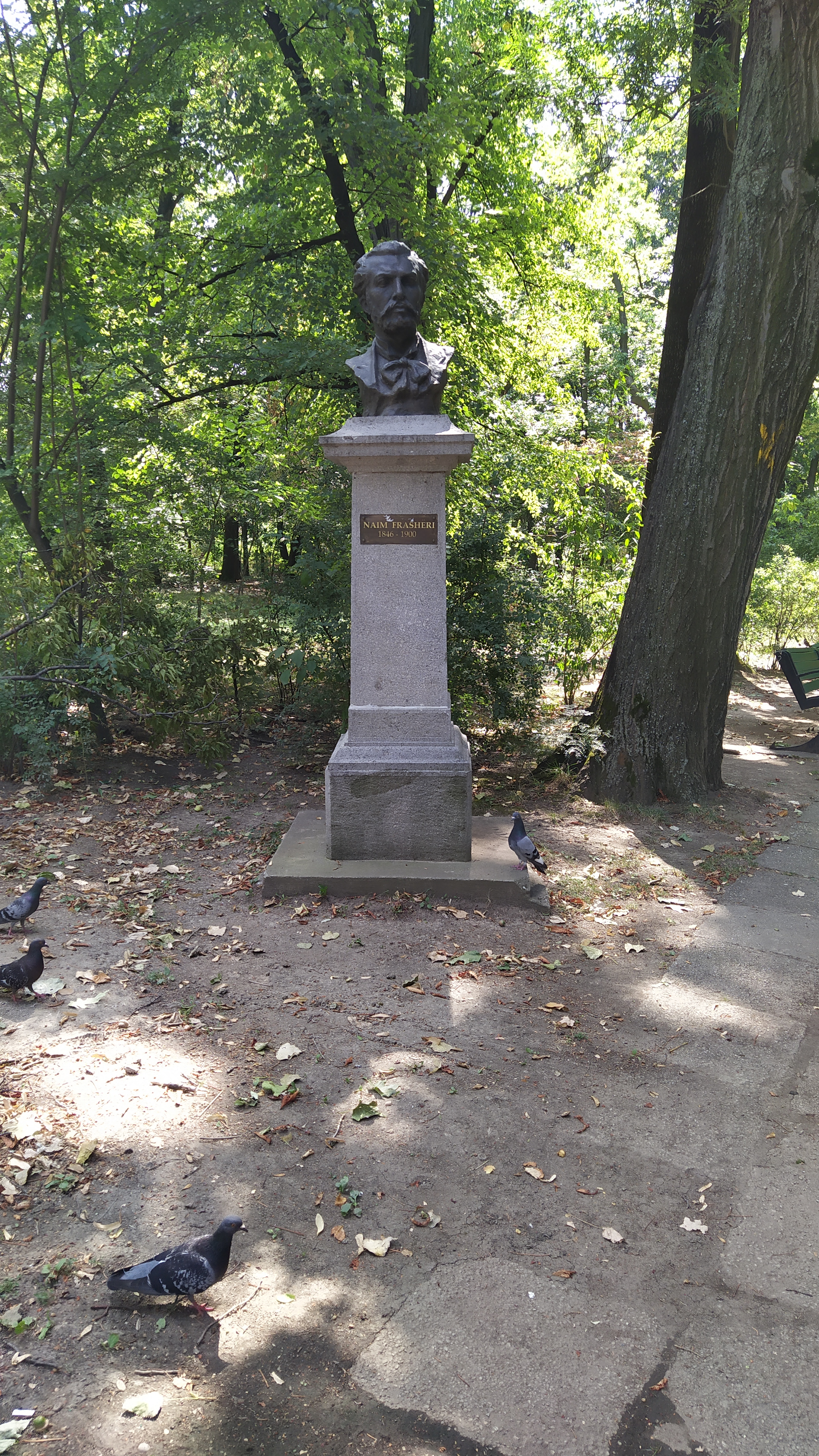
A bust of Naim Frashëri in Bucharest, Romania.

The prime representative of Romanticism in Albanian literature, Frashëri is considered by many to be the most distinguished Albanian poet of the Albanian Renaissance whose poetry continued to have a tremendous influence on the literature and society of the Albanian people in the 20th century. He is also widely regarded as the national poet of Albania and is celebrated as such among the Albanian people in Kosovo, Montenegro, North Macedonia and other Albanian-inhabited lands in the Balkans.

After his death, Frashëri became a source of inspiration for Albanian writers and intellectuals of the 20th century including Asdreni, Gjergj Fishta, Mitrush Kuteli and Lasgush Poradeci. His works such as Bagëti e Bujqësi, Gjuha Jonë and Feja promoted values of national unity and consciousness, tolerance and pride in ancestors' culture and history.

Albanians of the Bektashi faith were in particular influenced and motivated by his work. Himself a Bektashi, he desired purity of the Albanian language and had attempted in his lifetime to Albanianise hierarchical terms of the order in his work Fletore e Bektashinjët which called for an Albanian Bektashism. His poem Bagëti e Bujqësi celebrated the natural beauty of Albania and the simple life of Albanian people while expressing gratitude that Albania had bestowed upon him "the name Albanian". In Istori' e Skënderbeut, he celebrated his love for Albania by referring to the medieval battles between the Albanians and Ottomans while highlighting Skenderbeg's Albanian origins and his successful fight for liberation. In Gjuha Jonë, he called for fellow Albanians to honour their nation and write in Albanian while in another poem Feja, he pleaded with Albanians not make religious distinctions among themselves as they all were of one origin that speak Albanian.

Numerous organizations, monuments, schools, and streets had been founded and dedicated to his memory throughout Albania, Kosovo as well as to a lesser extent in North Macedonia and Romania. His family's house, where he was born and raised, in Frashër of Gjirokastër County is today a museum and was declared a monument of important cultural heritage. It houses numerous artefacts including handwritten manuscripts, portraits, clothing and the busts of him and his brothers Abdyl and Sami.

Frashëri's portrait is depicted on the obverses of the 500 lek banknote from 1992 to 1996 and since 1996 on the 200 lekë banknote. On the reverse side of the bill is a picture of his family house in Frashër. The Albanian nation has established an order of merit that bears his name which was awarded to, amongst others, the Albanian nun and missionary Mother Teresa.

== Gallery ==
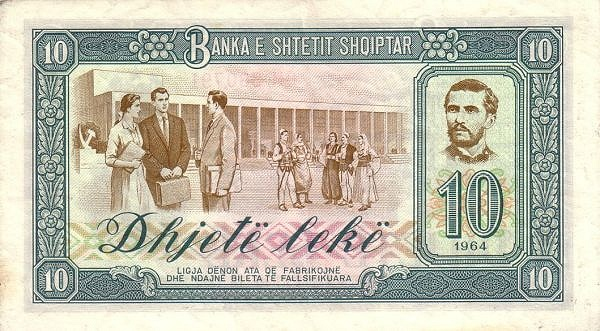
Frashëri (up right) on the reverse of a 1964 10 Lekë banknote

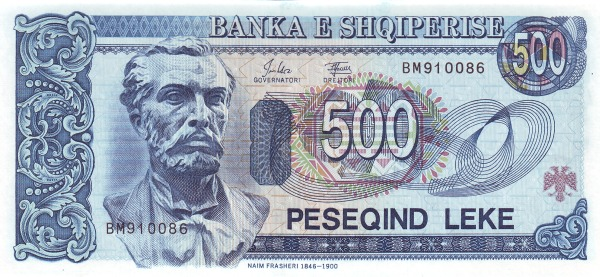
Frashëri on the obverse of a 1994 500 Lekë banknote

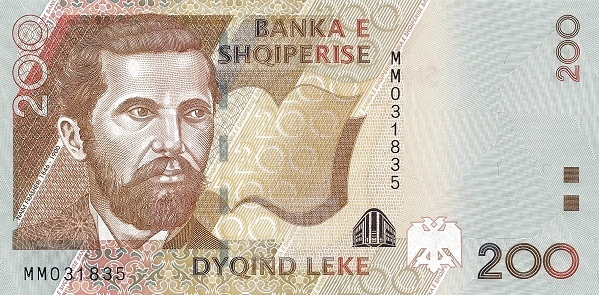
Frashëri on the obverse of a 2012 200 Lekë banknote

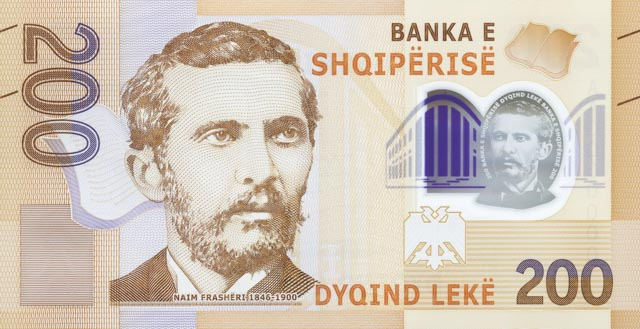
Frashëri on the obverse of 2017 200 Lekë polymer banknote

== See also ==
- List of Albanian writers
- Albanian Renaissance
- League of Prizren

== Sources ==
- Frashëri, Alfred; Frashëri, Neki (2014). Frashëri në historinë e Shqipërisë. Dudaj. ISBN 978-99943-0-051-8.
