= Haxhi Ymer Kashari =

Albanian poet in the 18th century

Haxhi Ymer Kashari known also as Ymer Mustafa Kashari was an Albanian bejtexhi of the 18th century.

Haxhi Ymer was born in Tirana in early 18th century. Back then part of the Sanjak of Scutari of the Ottoman Empire, Tirana was already flourishing as an oriental-style town. Haxhi Ymer was a sheikh (Sufi leader) of the Qadiri order of Sufism, a less spread order going towards extinction in Albania. Most of his work is lost because of earlier lack of interest in him. His name Haxhi indicates that he had completed his hajj in Mecca. He used the pen name Suzi. The outer facade of the portal of Et'hem Bey Mosque in Tirana has an inscription written by him with his pen-name as signature.

Haxhi Ymer was a bejte poet who wrote in two languages: Albanian and Turkish. From a few odes that are saved to date, one is of special interest. It is named Alif and it is one of a kind due to the specific structure it introduced to Albanian poetry of those times. The poem is based on the letters of the Arabic alphabet and thus has 28 verses, each verse starts with a unique letter in alphabetic order. The first starts with alif and the last with yā’. This type of verse introduced by Haxhi Ymer became a tradition in Albanian poetry and had many followers.

Though heavily laden with Oriental vocabulary, his work has linguistic significance due to the specific Tirana area Gheg dialect of the Albanian language (part of the Southern Gheg branch), being the oldest written piece in this dialect.

== See also ==
- Diwan poetry
