= Ilo Mitkë Qafzezi =

Albanian scholar and writer

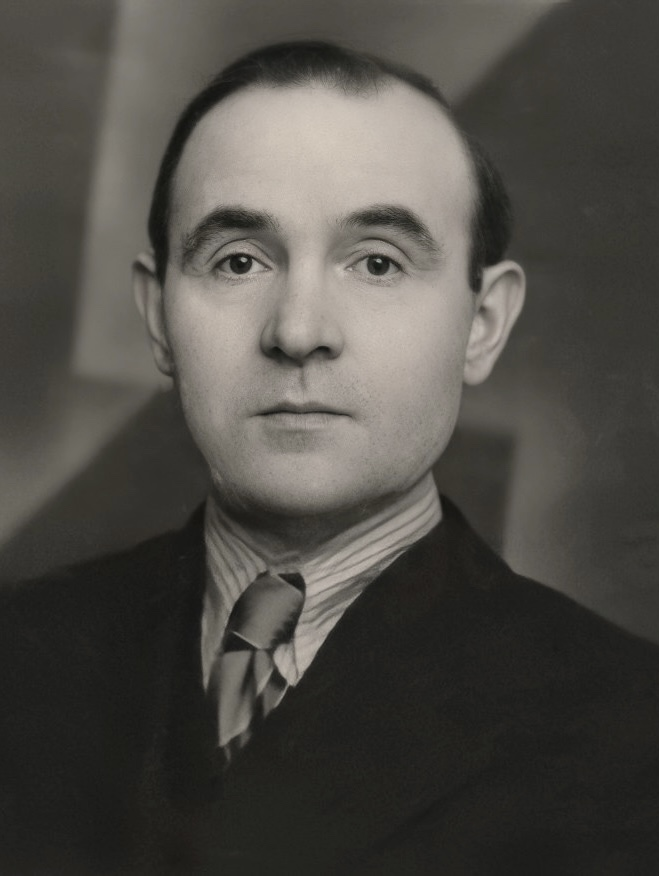
- Qafëzezi in the 1930s
- Born: 5 November 1889; Korçë, Manastir vilayet, Ottoman Empire (modern Albania)
- Died: April 16, 1964 (aged 74)
- Occupations: Teacher, researcher
- Known for: Constantine of Berat Codex; Translation of Alipashiad; Manuscripts of Theodore Kavalliotis; Discovery of the Aromanian Missal
- Notable work: Protopapa Theodhor Nastas Kavalioti, Teacher of the New Academy of Moscopole, 1718-1719

Ilo Mitkë Qafzezi (November 5, 1889 – April 16, 1964) was an Albanian prolific scholar and writer of historical and religious subjects. He is known as the translator of the Koran into Albanian in 1921.

== Life ==
Ilo Mitkë Qafzezi was born in 1889 in Korçë, Albania (then Ottoman Empire), to a family of mixed Albanian–Aromanian origins. He emigrated to Romania when he was thirteen and then to the United States. In 1924, he returned to Korçë, where he worked as a teacher and later as the school director of the Romanian school of the city, in use mostly by the Aromanian local community. Until World War II, he was known as the foremost Albanian biographer.

An autodidact, Qafzezi was very prolific in his publications in several literary and historical periodicals and bulletins. He also published important historical works on Moscopole, Berat and Vithkuq, and he discovered manuscripts of Theodore Kavalliotis's work, as well as a copy of the first edition of the Εισαγωγική Διδασκαλία ("Introductory instruction") of Daniel Moscopolites, published in Venice in 1794. Later, he discovered manuscripts of Kostandin Berati, as well as the primer of Naum Veqilharxhi, dated 1844. Qafëzezi translated into Albanian the Alipashiad, a poem on Ali Pasha of Tepelena, written originally in Greek, by Haxhi Shehreti. He also discovered an original Aromanian liturgical text from the 18th century known as the Aromanian Missal, which was posteriorly published by the Romanian Aromanian linguist Matilda Caragiu Marioțeanu in 1962.
