= Constantine of Berat =

Albanian writer and translator

- Konstandin Jeramonak Berati
- Born: Possibly 1745 likely in Berat
- Died: Possibly 1825
- Other names: Kostë Berati
- Occupation(s): Likely an Orthodox Monk, writer and translator.
- Notable work: Codex of Constantine of Berat

Constantine of Berat, known among Albanians as Kostandin Jermonak Berati or shortly Kostë Berati, was an Albanian writer and translator of the 18th century.

== Life and work ==
Not much is known about him, except that he was from Berat, today's southern part of central Albania, then Sanjak of Berat in Vilayet of Janina of the Ottoman Empire. His lifespan was highly probably between 1745 and 1825. Also, Constantine was quite likely an Orthodox monk. Elsie mentions that some experts doubt his existence, at least as a writer. He has copied a part of the "lexicon" of Theodore Kavalliotis, and is believed to have signed in 1779 a religious document (in Greek) together with Kavallioti and Teodor Haxhifilipi in Moscopole.

Constantine of Berat is attributed as the author of a manuscript from 1764 to 1822, originally a 154 or 152-page work. It is preserved in the National Library in Tirana. This so-called Codex of Constantine of Berat or Codex of Berat (but not to be confused with Codex Beratinus I and II), is a simple paper manuscript and must not be envisaged as an illuminated parchment codex in the Western tradition. The Albanian part of the manuscript contains some religious prayers and Bible fragments, a hymn-poetry on Christ's suffering, and a Greek-Albanian dictionary. It was discovered by the Albanian researcher and Rilindas Ilo Mitkë Qafëzezi in 1938. In Qafëzezi's study "Protopapa Theodhor Nastas Kavalioti, Teacher of the New Academy of Voskopojë, 1718–1719" of 1951, he mentions that "from the perspective of the Albanian language, in general, the work of Kosta (Berati) is greater than and superior to the Albanian of all his contemporary writers". Albanian researcher Bedri Dedja considers Constantine's alphabet and writings as influential in the "New Academy" of Voskopojë, and is part of a wider cultural enlightenment of the Berat area. The codex seems to have been the work of at least two hands and was completed around 1798 at the earliest. It contains various texts in Greek and Albanian: biblical and Orthodox liturgical texts in Albanian written in the Greek alphabet, all of them no doubt translated from Greek or strongly influenced by Greek models. His alphabet contained 37 letters. Since the Greek script does not contain Albanian sounds ë, nj, sh, zh, etc, he used diacritic letters. I.e. the "ë" shows up as a rotated Latin script "i" or an "alpha" with an Iota subscript, "nj" as "ni", etc. Among the texts in the Codex of Berat is a forty-four-line Albanian poem, with the corresponding Greek text, called "The Virgin Mary before the Cross" (Albanian: Zonja Shën Mëri përpara kryqësë). It is written in so-called fifteen-syllable political verse. According to Elsie, the poem seems to be based on a Greek original by Akakios Diakrusis of Cephalonia, published in 1730. Also, the manuscript contains valuable information on Cosmas of Aetolia and his journeys through Albania.

Constantine also compiled two Greek-Albanian glossaries comprising a total of 1,710 entries, most of Albanian words belong to the Berat dialect and are commonly used there. He also wrote a short passage containing another original Albanian alphabet which resembles the Glagolitic-Cyrillic script. Only two verses are written in this alphabet. The rest of his work consists of various religious notes; and a chronicle of events between 1764 and 1789 written in Greek. The Orthodox communities of central and southern Albania used later some of the religious texts in this manuscript later circulated for teaching purposes.

Constantine's work and similar contemporary works of his time aimed at making the Orthodox religion as understandable as possible to the Orthodox Albanians who did not speak Greek, or/and facilitating them to learn the Greek language. Due to its importance, the manuscript is top-listed to be digitized as part of the Albanological Portal, a joint project of the Albanian and Kosovo National Libraries.

A street in Berat is named after him.

== Controversy ==
German Albanologist Armin Hetzer in 1982 was the first scientist to notice that the name Constantinos in the Berat manuscript is not a reference to a person, but to a date (St. Constanties date). Thus, according to Hetzer, there was no Constantine in Berat that authored the manuscript, instead he notices another name in it of a certain Thimi Nuni. More recently (2019), Albanian philologists Bardhyl Demiraj made a claim agreeing with the German, seeing it possible that Constantine of Berat, in fact, never existed. There seems to be a rise in the number of researchers agreeing with this hypothesis.

== See also ==
- Albanian literature
- Elbasan alphabet
- Vithkuqi alphabet
- Orthodoxy in Albania
