= Sina family =

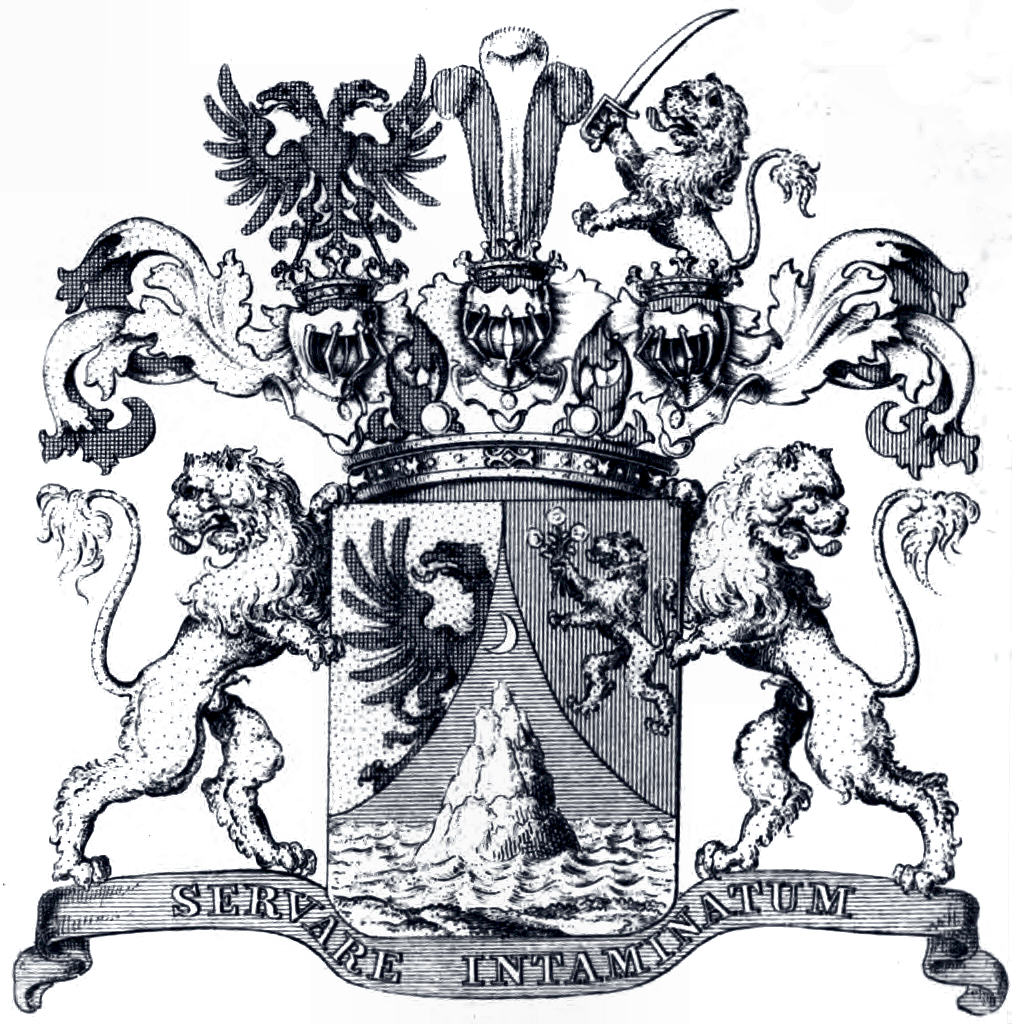
Coat of arms of the Sina family

The Sina or Sinas family was a prominent banking family in the Austrian Empire, ennobled with the title of Barons of Hodos and Kisdia. For less than a century, they were among the wealthiest and most economically influential dynasties in the empire, being the fiercest competitors of the Rothschild family. The Sina family was also the only Christian family among the leading banking houses of imperial Austria.

The daughters of the last male Sina married into old French, Austrian and Romanian noble families, while his father had married a member of the Ghika family. All male successors bore the name "Simon" in the first or second position for three consecutive generations. The Sina family financially supported the Greek, Hungarian and Romanian national movements.

== Origin ==
The Sina family originated from the town of Moscopole (in present-day Albania.) From there, it moved to Sarajevo (Bosnia), then Croatia, and finally to Vienna (Austria). Their ethnic origin has been described as Aromanian, Hellenized Aromanian, or Greek. From the early 18th century onward—and throughout their entire existence in Austria—the family is firmly attested as being Orthodox Christian.

== Sina family in Austria ==
The first recorded member was Simon Georg Sina the Elder (1753, Sarajevo – 3 August 1822, Vienna). He was a businessman in Ottoman Bosnia), primarily engaged in the export and import of tobacco. According to Max Demeter Peyfuss, he was the richest man in the Austrian Empire. Simon married twice. His first wife (married 1782) was Irene Czippe (1767–1793), with whom he had a son, Georg Simon von Sina (1782–1856). His second wife (married 1802), Katharina von Gyra (1777–1843), bore him another son, Johann Simon (1804–1869).

In 1798, Simon founded a wholesale trading house in Niš. Beginning in 1803, he made his elder son Georg Simon a partner in the enterprise. After relocating to Vienna in 1811, Simon became a subject of the Austrian Empire and received permission to operate a wholesale company there. He thus founded in the Austrian capital the Sina Wholesale and Banking House. Following the acquisition of the Hungarian domains Hodos and Kisdia, he and his sons were elevated to the Hungarian nobility on 3 April 1818 with the title von Hodos und Kisdia.

Upon their father's death in 1822, the eldest son, Georg Simon, took over the banking house under his own name, while his half-brother Johann Simon remained involved. On 26 July 1832 the brothers were ennobled as Hungarian barons, and on 8 March 1838 Austrian barons. From then on, the bank was known as Bankhaus Baron von Sina. In 1836 they also received the right to bear their title in Bohemia, Moravia, and Silesia.

=== Georg Simon von Sina ===
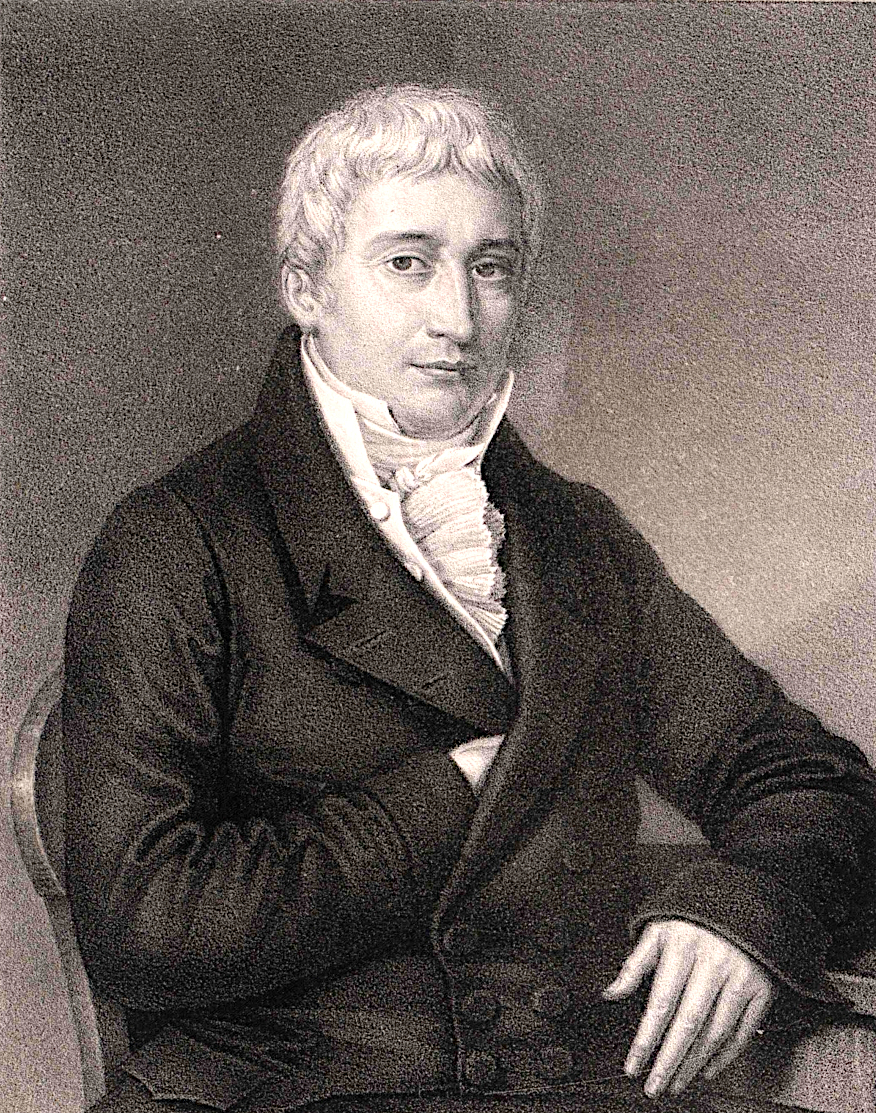
Georg Simon Freiherr von Sina

Georg Simon owned estates in Wallachia, Transylvania, the Banat, Hungary, Bohemia, Moravia, Lower Austria (Mauerbach, Rappoltenkirchen, Gföhl, Leopoldsdorf), as well as in Greece, and properties in Vienna. He participated in factory foundations and railway construction, and by around 1850 was considered one of the wealthiest men in the monarchy, the principal rival of the Rothschilds, and the only Christian among the four great Austrian bankers.

He married Katharina Derra von Moroda (1792–1851) and had one son—the only male heir of the family. Georg was also an important financial supporter of the Transylvanian School movement. He was the main financial supporter of the construction of the Athens Observatory, as well as of the Budapest Chain Bridge. Georg von Sina retained relations with the newly established Kingdom of Greece and in 1833 was made the ambassador of Greece to the Austrian Empire by King Otto, a position he held for the rest of his life.

The Sina family maintained close relations with the Russian Empire, and much of the Russian aristocracy deposited its money in the Sina Bank.

At Georg's death, the state owed him 3 million florins. Sinagasse in Vienna's 22nd district, Leopoldstadt (formerly Jägergasse), was named posthumously in his honor in 1877.

=== Johann Simon von Sina ===
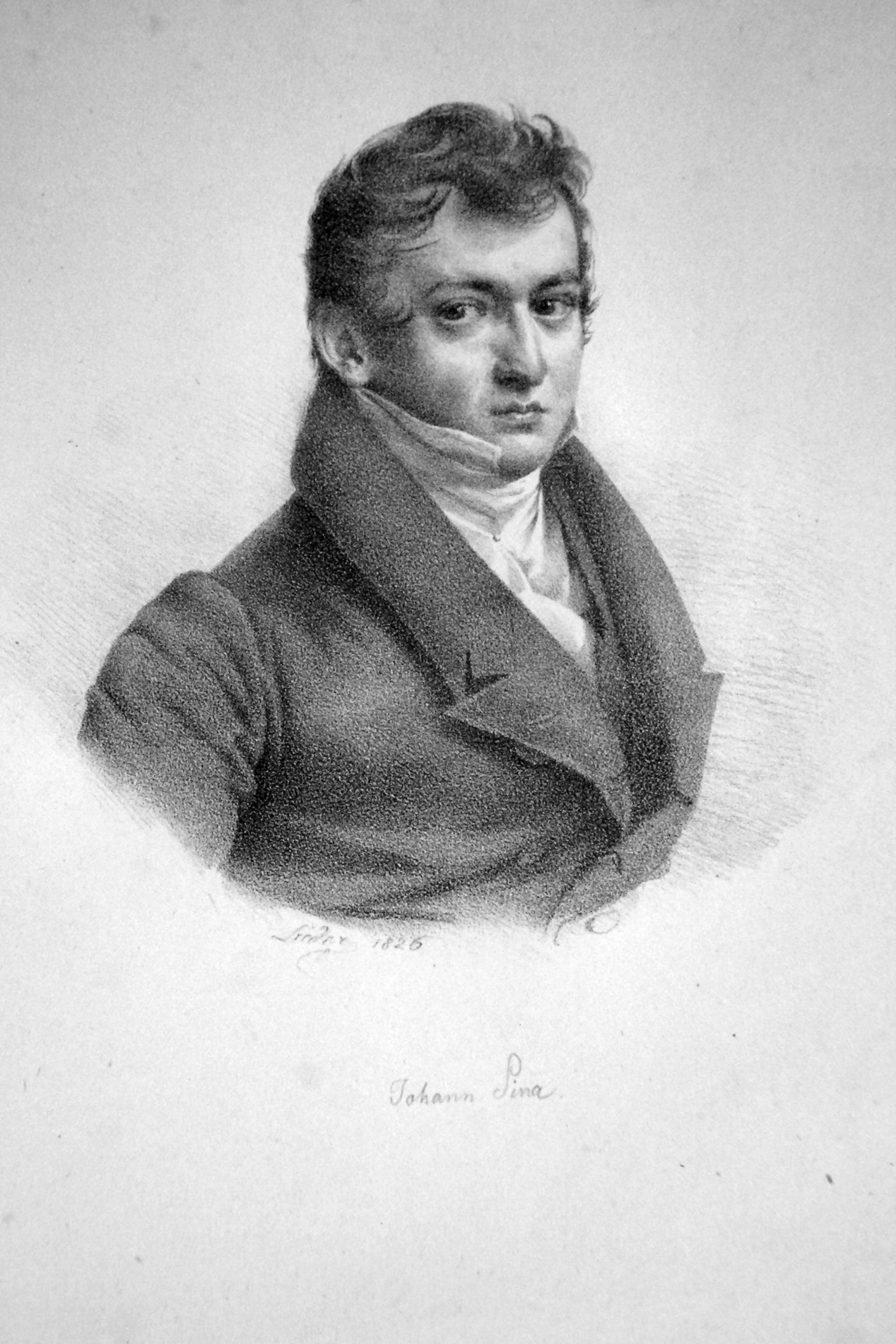
Johann Simon Freiherr von Sina

Johann Simon (Ioan Simeon), the second son of Simon the Elder, founded in the 1840s one of the largest sugar beet factories in Austria, located on his Szent-Miklós estate in Hungary. Its profitability declined over time, resulting in significant financial losses and eventual closure. He remained a co-partner of his brother's bank but received only an annuity of 60,000 florins per year. Thus, in contrast to his extremely wealthy half-brother Georg Simon, Viennese society dubbed him “Sina the Poor”.

Despite this, Johann held influential positions in Viennese public life, including director of the National Bank, the State Railway, and president of the Donaudampfschiffahrtsgesellschaft (Danube Steamship Company). Serious health problems forced him to resign from all posts, and early in 1869 newspapers reported his death from apoplexy at breakfast. Johann married Marie von Nicarussi (b. 1818); the couple had no descendants.

=== Baron Simeon Georg von Sina (1810–1876) ===
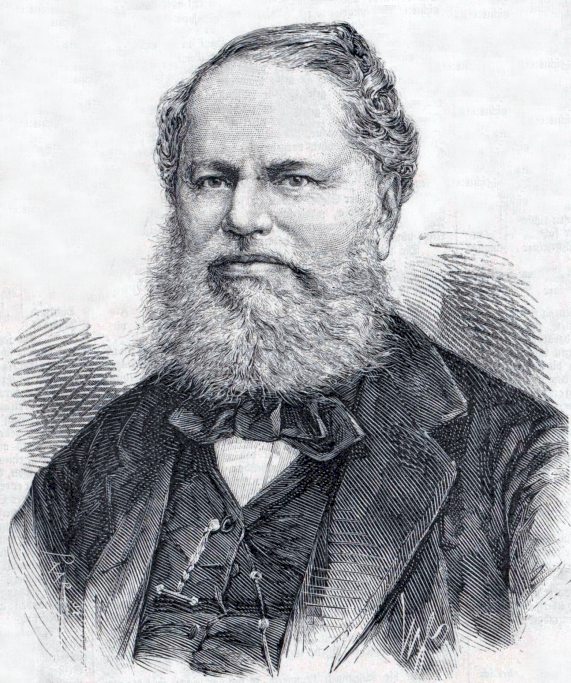
Simon Georg Freiherr von Sina

Simeon Georg (Simon Georg) von Sina (1810–1876), the son and grandson of his predecessors bearing the same name, was a privy councillor and member of the Upper Chamber of the Austrian Empire (1874). He was also a member of the Senate, maintained leadership roles in the Hungarian Academy of Sciences and the Vienna Academy of Fine Arts, and served as director of the Hungarian General Credit Bank.

As the sole heir of a vast fortune, he became known not merely as a wealthy landowner but as a generous patron of public and cultural institutions.

He donated 40,000 florins to various public institutions in Pest. As Greek Royal Legate (he served as the ambassador of Greece to Austria from 1858 to 1864), he funded in 1858 the expansion of the Greek Uniate Church in Vienna (Fleischmarkt 13), designed by Theophil Hansen. Hansen also replaced the old Palais Sina with a new building in 1859–1860.

In 1864 Simeon financed the repatriation of Austrian troops from Schleswig-Holstein. He funded most of the construction of the University of Athens and stipulated in a codicil that if the one million florins allotted for the project were not spent during his lifetime, the remainder should continue to be used for that purpose. He also donated 3,000 florins for the construction of the Metropolitan Cathedral in Sibiu and supported the România Jună student society in Vienna.

He left 60,000 florins to Vienna's poor, 6,000 florins to the poor of Rappoltenkirchen, and substantial sums to Christian as well as Jewish religious institutions.

==== Marriage and issue ====
Simeon Georg married Iphigénie (1815–1884), born in Budapest, the daughter of Constantin Emanoil Ghika (1780–1825) and Anastasia Dadányi von Gyülvész (1780–1844). They had one son, Gheorghe, who died in childhood, and four daughters:

- Anastasia (1838–1889), married on 11 January 1860 at Vevey to Count Viktor Ägidius Heeremann von Wimpffen (1834–1897), privy councillor, president of the Austrian Southwestern Railway, general inspector of the Imperial State Telegraphs, and writer.
- Irena (1843–1881), married on 19 May 1864 in Paris to Gheorghe Mavrocordat, a major Romanian boyar and entrepreneur who built the Mavrocordat House (Children's Palace) in Vaslui (1883–1892). Their son was George (1865–1939).
- Elena (1845–1893), married on 23 November 1862 to diplomat and plenipotentiary minister in Vienna Grigore Ipsilanti (1835–1886), of the princely Ypsilantis family.
- Iphigénie (1846–1914), married (1) on 24 May 1864 in Paris to Edmund Charles de la Croix, Duc de Castries (1838–1886), brother-in-law of French president and Marshal Patrice de MacMahon; (2) on 25 October 1887 to Emmanuel Vicomte d’Harcourt (1844–1928), a French cavalry officer.

Baron Simeon Georg von Sina was the last male descendant of the family. With his death in 1876, the Sina name became extinct.

== Gallery ==
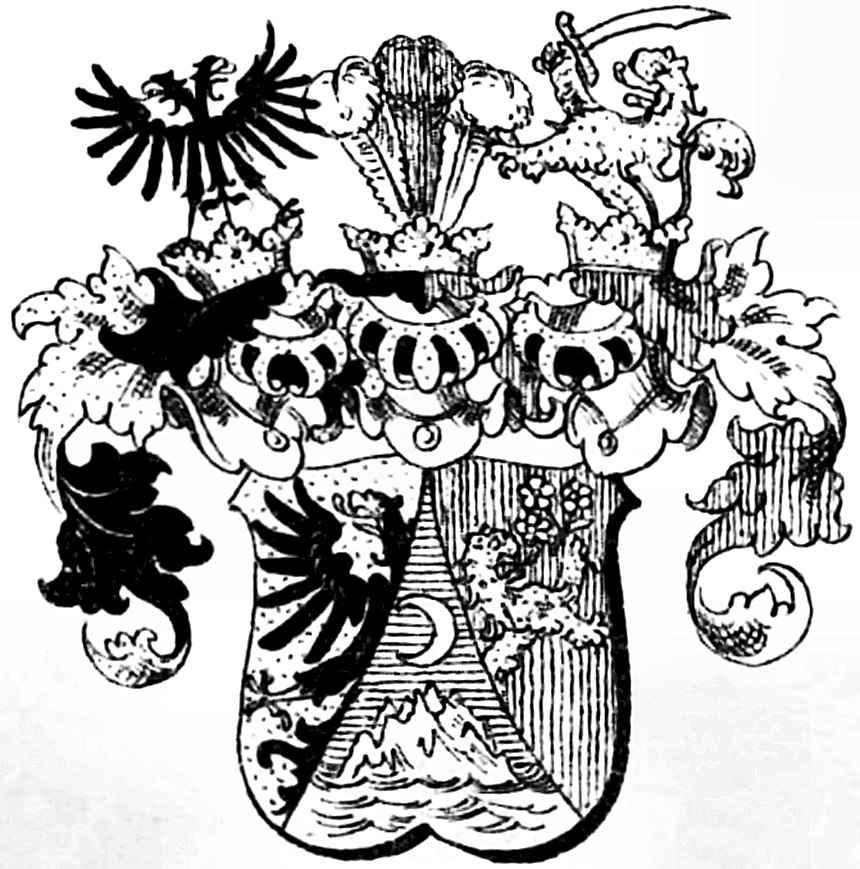
Hungarian Coat of Arms, 1818

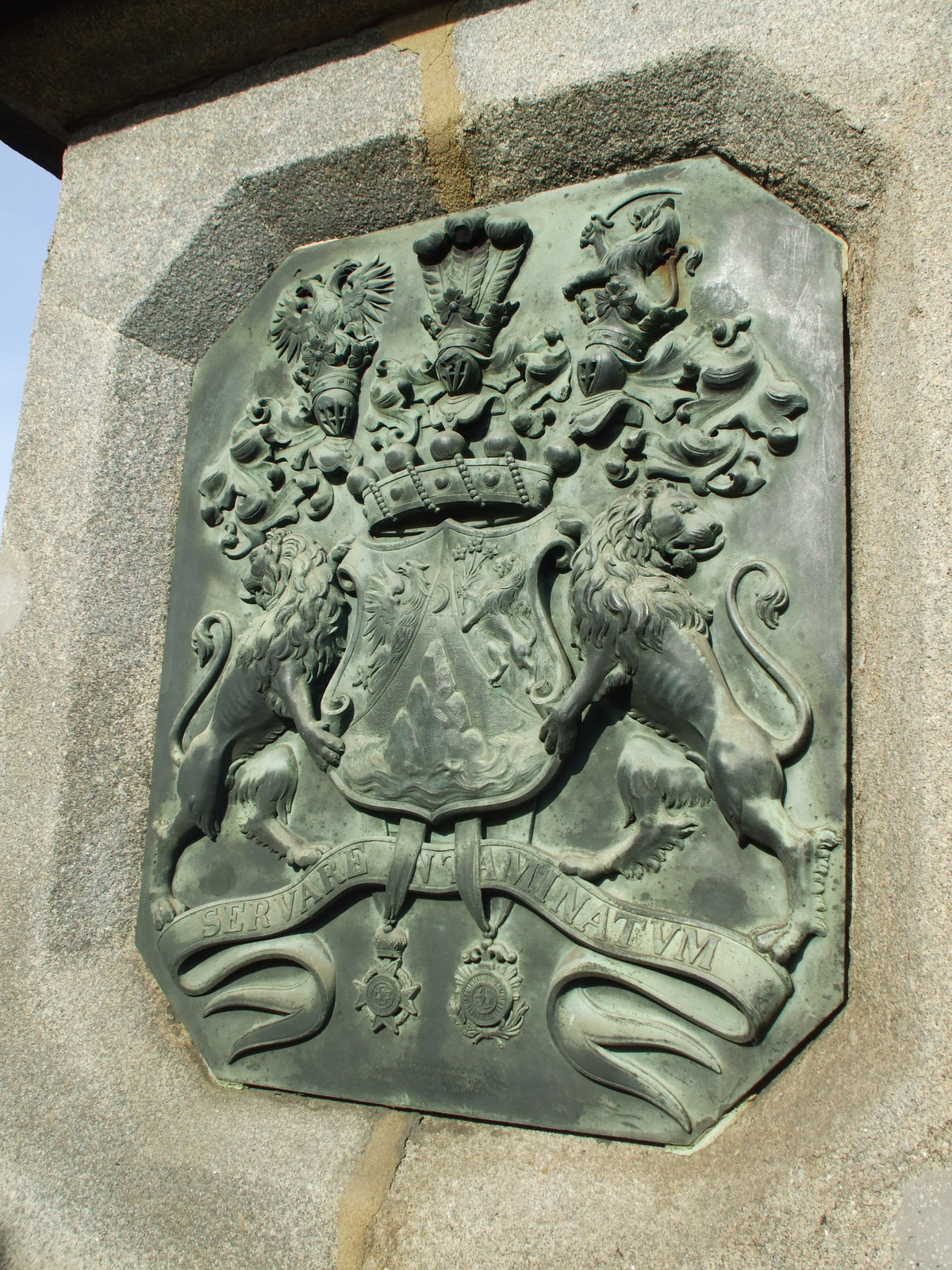
Coat of Arms of the Sina Family on the Budapest Chain Bridge

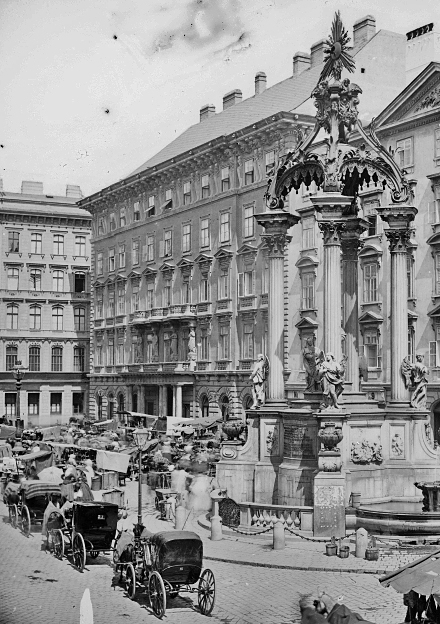
Sina Palace in Vienna (destroyed during the Second World War)

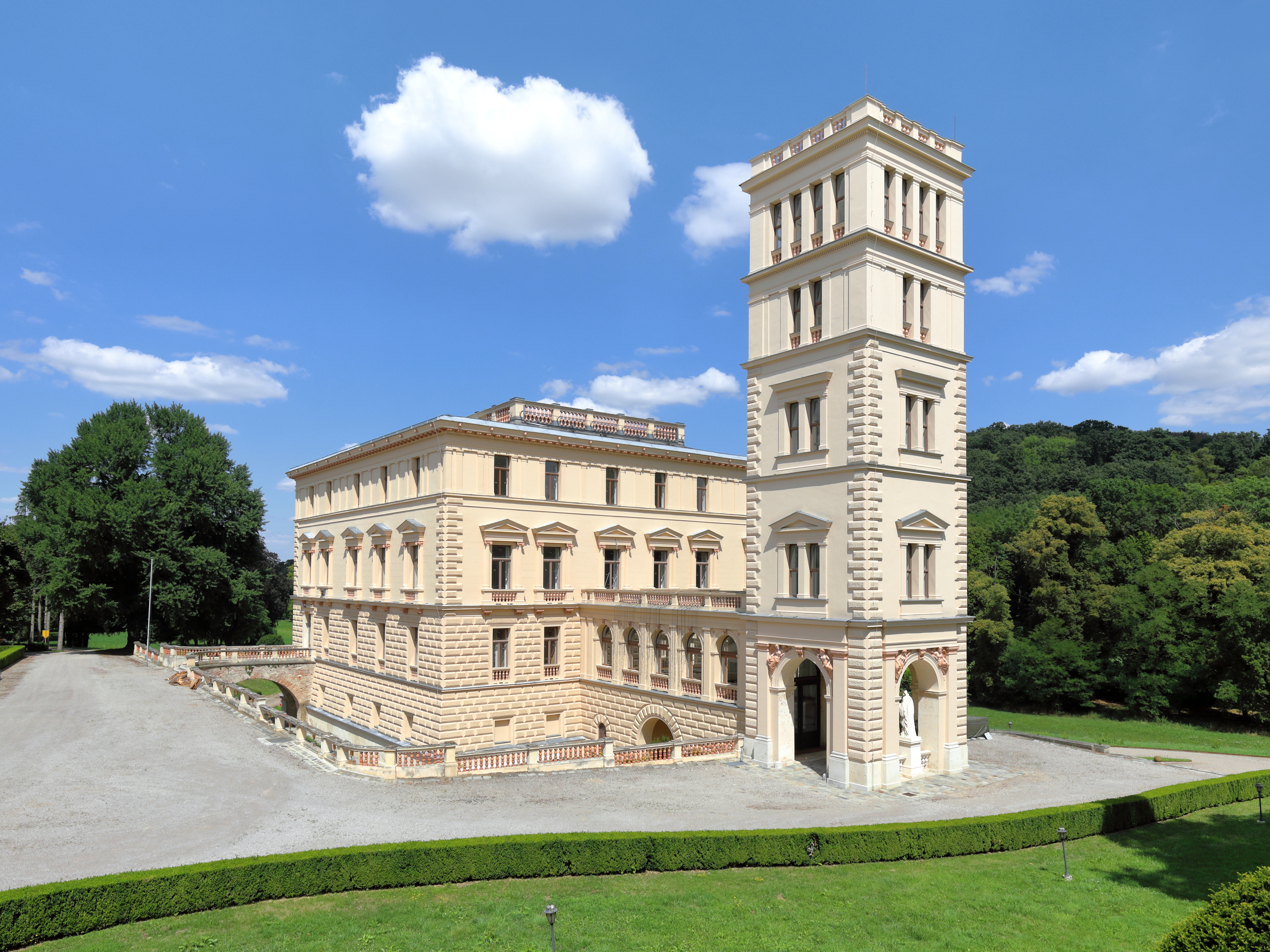
Rappoltenkirchen Castle in Lower Austria, where Georg and Simon are buried
