= Aromanian Missal =

18th-century Aromanian-language liturgical book

The Aromanian Missal (Aromanian: Lituryieru armãnescu) is an anonymous Aromanian-language instructive liturgical book (missal) variously referred to as dating from the beginning, the first half, the middle and the second half of the 18th century. It is the first extensive text in Aromanian, and includes translations of sermons and other religious texts into Aromanian. The Aromanian Missal is believed to have been written in Moscopole, once a prosperous Aromanian city, and uses the Greek alphabet due to archaic forms of Greek being considered the appropriate language for high and literary functions in those times within the Balkans. In recent times, the text of the liturgy has begun to circulate more actively among the Aromanians in Albania with support from the Aromanian diaspora. In a 2002 study on the Aromanians, German researcher Thede Kahl stated that priest Thoma sang this Aromanian-language liturgy at the St. Nicholas Church (Aromanian: Bãserica Ayiu Nicola) of Moscopole.

The Aromanian Missal was discovered in 1939 by Ilo Mitkë Qafëzezi, a scholar and writer of mixed Albanian–Aromanian origins, in the archives of the National Library of Albania in Tirana. Upon its discovery, Qafëzezi sent copies of the manuscript to his colleagues at the University of Bucharest Theodor Capidan and Victor Papacostea, as well as to the Romanian newspaper Universul. Later, in 1957, Qafëzezi sent copies of the document to the Iorgu Iordan – Alexandru Rosetti Institute of Linguistics for the missal's study. In a 1962 monograph, the Aromanian linguist Matilda Caragiu Marioțeanu formally published the contents of the missal as the Liturghier aromânesc ("Aromanian Missal").

The Aromanian Missal is one of the earliest Aromanian-language works along with the also anonymous Codex Dimonie and the publications of Theodore Kavalliotis, Daniel Moscopolites and Constantin Ucuta. Caragiu Marioțeanu described the Aromanian language of the missal as being "relatively unitary, systematic, and consistent, and closer to the language used by the writers from the end of the 19th century". She also highlighted that it is the only Aromanian-language book for divine service without Romanian or newly-introduced Latin influences.
