= Dionysios Mantoukas =

Dionysios Mantoukas (1648–1751; Greek: Διονύσιος Μαντούκας) was the Greek Orthodox bishop of Kastoria, Western Macedonia, modern Greece, from 1694 to 1719. Mantoukas was born in the town of Moscopole, now in modern southeast Albania, in 1648. He was an ethnic Aromanian.
