= Max Demeter Peyfuss =

Austrian historian, translator and writer (1944–2019)

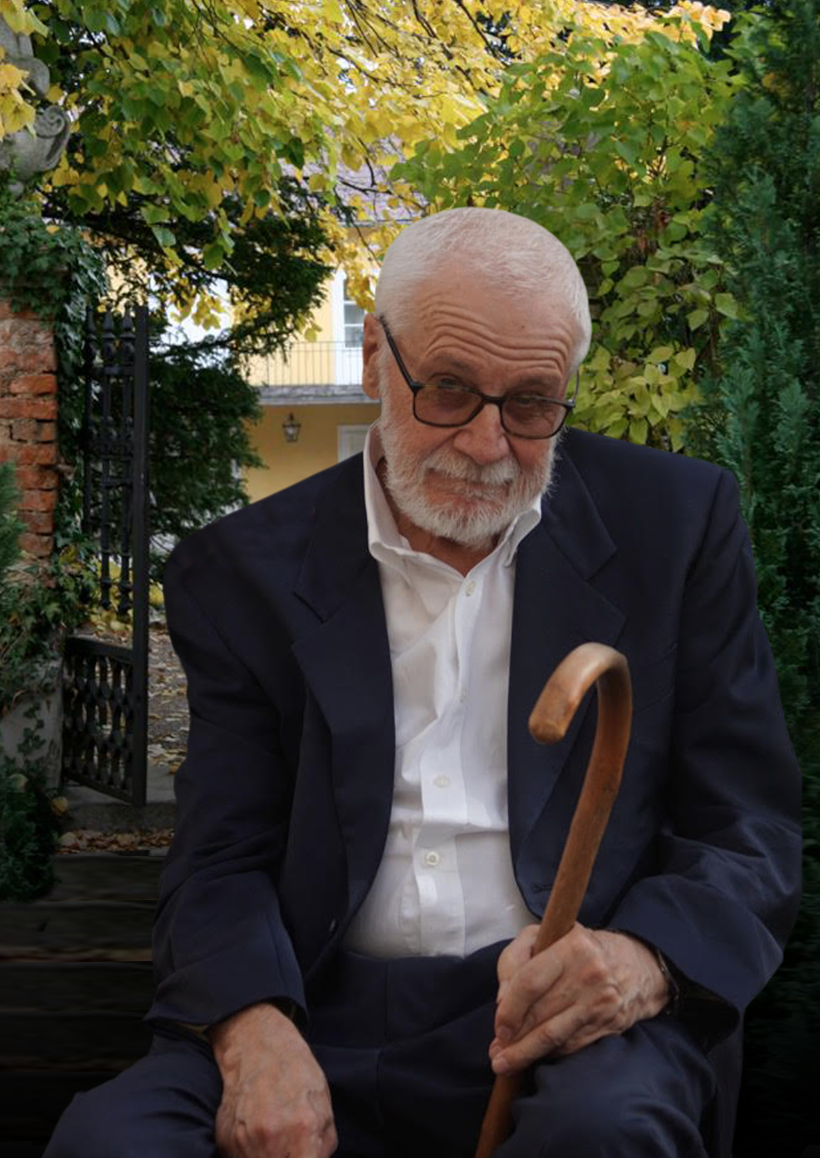

Maximilian Demeter Peyfuss (2 August 1944 Vienna - 13 April 2019 Baden), was an Austrian historian, translator and writer.

Peyfuss specialized in Eastern European history and was a researcher and translator for Eastern and Southeastern Europe contemporary Romanian literature.

== Education ==
Peyfuss came from Maria Enzersdorf in Austria. After graduating from the federal high school in Mödling and studying German, theater studies, Eastern European history, and Balkan languages at the University of Vienna,

Peyfuss began his academic career with a dissertation on the history of the Aromanians. His interest came from having some Aromanians ancestors from Albania. The resulting publication was The Aromanian Question. Its development from the origins to the Peace of Bucharest and the attitude of Austria-Hungary was the first modern publication in German on these people, who were scattered across half the Balkans.

== Academic career ==
Soon after receiving his doctorate in 1971, Peyfuss became a member of the editorial team at Österreichische Osthefte, an Austrian journal on Eastern Europe.

In 1979 Peyfuss became a university assistant at the Institute for Eastern European History at the University of Vienna and was primarily an employee of Walter Leitsch. In addition to his work in teaching, Peyfuss became editor of the Studia Austro-Polonica series published in Krakow. He completed his habilitation in 1989 with a book on the impact of the Moscopole printing house on Southeastern European history. This publication on book printing and veneration of saints in the Archdiocese of Achrida / Ohrid was also translated into Albanian in 2003.

After being appointed associate professor for Southeast European History at the University of Vienna in 1992- Peyfuss began a two-semester lecture on Balkan Studies., He also worked on the relocation of the institute to its new campus in the IX. District.

As a bibliophile, Peyfuss had an extensive library that contained many rarities on the history of southeastern and eastern Europe. He added many antiquarian books from his many trips to the Balkans, but also the latest new publications for the institute library,

On 1 January 2000 the University of Vienna appointed Peyfuss as a university professor. The West University of Timișoara bestowed Peyfuss with an honorary doctorate in 2005.

=== Translations ===
Peyfuss helped his Romanian colleagues to become known in the West with several translations. He also translated the poem "Confession" from the "Message of Encouragement" by Petre Stoica. In addition to Petre Stoica, he also translated works by Anatol E. Baconsky.

- Das Aequinoktium der Wahnsinnigen und andere Erzählungen / Anatol E. Baconsky. Aus dem Rumänischen von Max Demeter Peyfuss; Styria Verlag, 1969 ISBN 978-3-89840-277-4.
- Die Aromunische Frage. Ihre Entwicklung von den Ursprüngen bis zum Frieden von Bukarest und die Haltung Österreich-Ungarn. Böhlau 1974. ISBN 9783205085874.
- Die Schwarze Kirche / Anatol E. Baconsky. [Ins Dt. übertragen von Max Demeter Peyfuss] Ullstein Verlag, 1976 ISBN 978-3-550-16263-3.
- Wie ein zweites Vaterland / Anatol E. Baconsky. Mit e. Nachw. von Wilhelm Steinboeck. [Nach d. rumänischen Orig.-Ms. Übers. u. hrsg. von Max Demeter Peyfuss]; Styria Verlag, 1978 ISBN 978-3-222-11110-5.
- Die Druckerei von Moschopolis, 1731–1769: Buchdruck und Heiligenverehrung im Erzbistum Achrida. Böhlau Verlag, Wien 1989. ISBN 3205052935.

== Family history ==
After his marriage to Theodora Tirka (1863–1920) from Enzersdorf in 1891, Max Demeter Peyfuss' grandfather, the academic painter Carl Johann Peyfuss, brother of Marietta Peyfuss, settled in Maria Enzersdorf. Theodora Tirka was a daughter from the last marriage of the princely Serbian government banker Demeter Theodor Tirka (1802–1874) with the Upper Austrian Theresia Sulzer (1837–1922). Demeter Th. Tirka, who has had a wealth in Maria Enzersdorf since 1840, came from an Aromanian family from Moscopole, now Albania, a member of a small people scattered across the Balkans who find their identity in a Romance language related to Romanian.

== Albania ==
Peyfuss was an activist of the "Austrian-Albanian Association". He joined the association in the 1970s as a student of Karl Treimer and held the post of treasurer. His cultural activity in the association begins with his participation in the commemoration in Kosovo, of the 500th anniversary of the death of Gjergj Kastriot - Skanderbeg.

In 1970, Peyfuss received an invitation from Albania, to which he responded in gratitude by publishing several articles in newspapers. After the publication of these articles, his relations with the communist government of Albania deteriorated. Peyfuss was banned from Albania until the 1980s, when, with the mediation of the academy's president, Aleks Buda, he was allowed to enter Albania.

After a while, Peyfuss took over the leadership of the Institute for the History of Eastern Europe at the University of Vienna. Max Peyfuss is popular among historians as a modern-day specialist in Aromanian history with settlements in northern Greece, Albania, Macedonia and Bulgaria.
