= St. John the Baptist Monastery, Voskopojë =

Historic site in Moscopole

St. John the Baptist Monastery
- Manastiri i Shën Prodhromit or Manastiri i Shën Gjon Pagëzorit
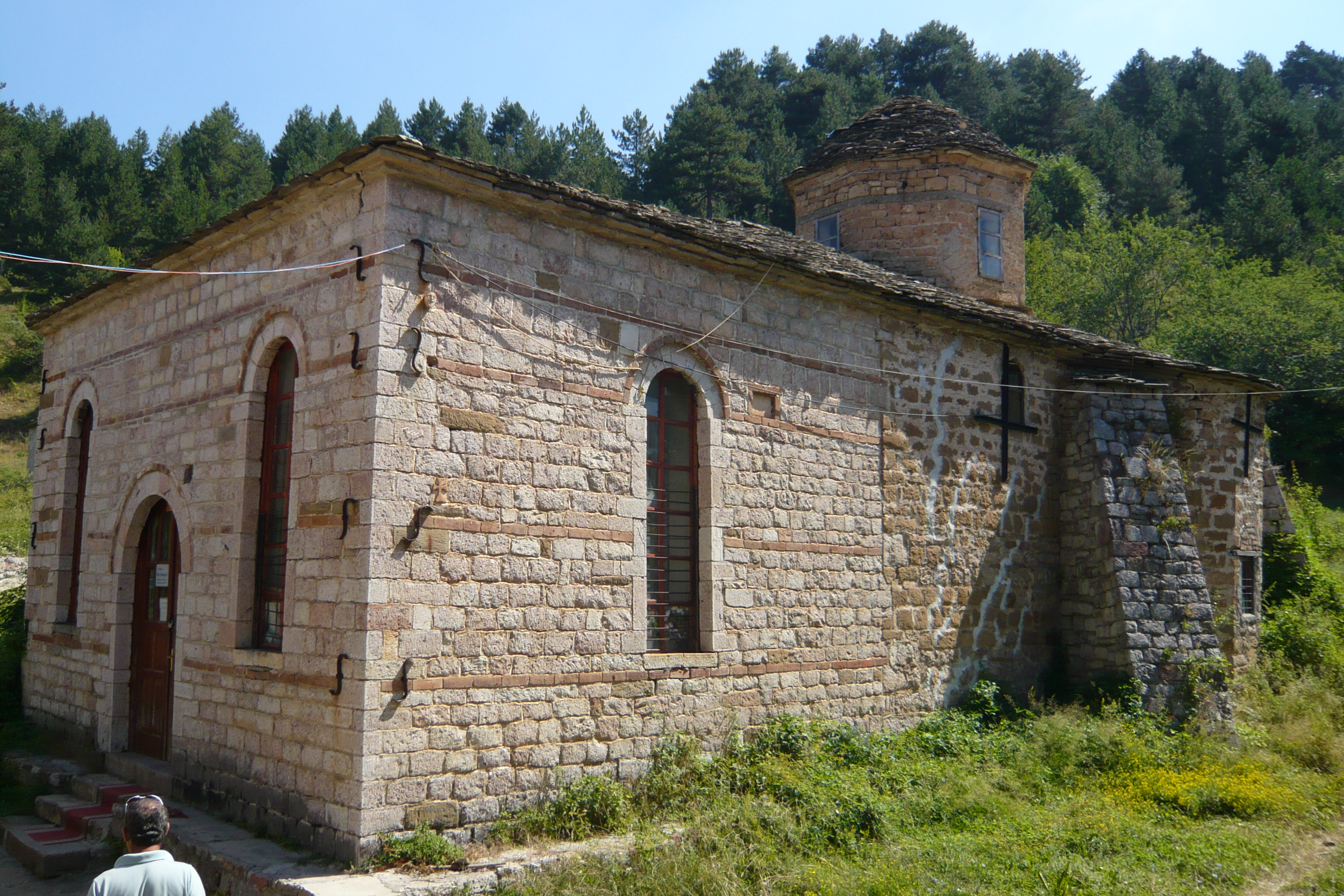
- The monastery’s Katholikon
- Interactive map of St. John the Baptist Monastery

Monastery information
- Order: Albanian Orthodox Church
- Denomination: Eastern Orthodoxy
- Dedication: Saint John the Baptist

Architecture
- Architect: Unknown architect: painted by Andon Shipskioti and then later Theodor Simo Grunde.
- Completed date: Built in 1632, painted in 1659

Site
- Location: Voskopojë, Albania
- Country: Albania
- Coordinates: 40.64546°N 20.60269°E
- Public access: Yes

The St. John the Baptist Monastery (Albanian: Manastiri i Shën Prodhromit or Manastiri i Shën Gjon Pagëzorit) is an Eastern Orthodox monastery in Voskopojë, Albania. It is dedicated to St. John the Baptist.

== History and description ==
According to the donor's inscription, the church inside the Monastery was built in 1632 and painted in 1659. Today the monastery is declared a Cultural Monument of Albania. The monastery includes the church as well as two other buildings which were part of the monastery. The church has dimensions of 17m x 7.65 X 9m. The frescoes are preserved and in a good afresket and worked with components of iron and calcium. According to the monastery’s codex, the frescoes of the church were decorated in the works of Andon Shipskioti and then later Theodor Simo Grunde. The church is characterized by decoration on a particular type of tile that is found in the area.

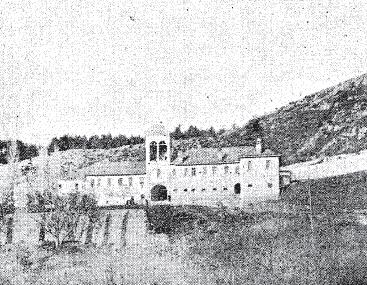
The Monastery, early 20th century
