= Simon Sinas =

Austrian-Greek banker, diplomat and benefactor

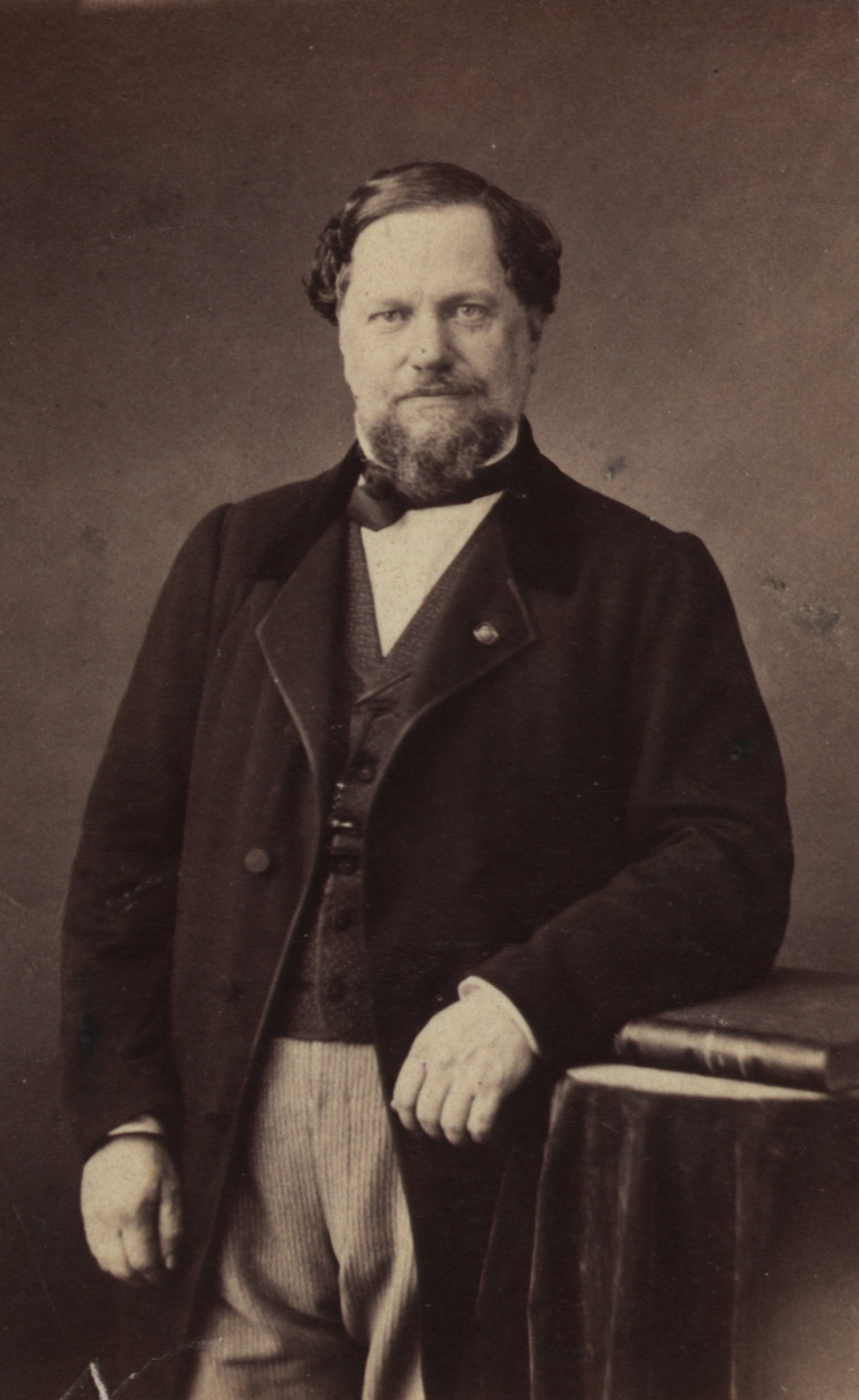
- Photograph of Simon Sinas
- Born: 15 August 1810; Vienna, Austrian Empire
- Died: 15 April 1876 (aged 65); Vienna, Austria-Hungary
- Other name: Simon von Sina
- Education: University of Vienna
- Occupation: Businessman
- Known for: Benefaction and Diplomacy

Simon Sinas or Simon von Sina (Greek: Σίμων Σίνας; Romanian: Simeon Sina; 15 August 1810 – 15 April 1876) was an Austrian-Greek banker, aristocrat, benefactor and diplomat. He was one of the most important benefactors of the Greek nation together with his father Georgios Sinas.

== Biography ==
Simon Sinas was born on 15 August 1810 in Vienna. The Sinas family came from the Aromanian settlement of Moscopole in southern Albania. The son of Georgios Sinas, also a benefactor and diplomat, Sinas expanded his father's business. His ethnic origin has been described as Aromanian, Hellenized Aromanian, or Greek. Regardless of his ethnic origin, Sinas was part of the social-cultural Greek merchant class which maintained close relations with the newly founded Greek state of his era. He served as Greek consul in Vienna, and later as minister to Austria, the Kingdom of Bavaria, and Germany. He also made major donations to various educational and scientific foundations in Austria, Hungary, and Greece. During his time as Greek ambassador in Vienna, Johann Strauss II composed the Hellenen-Polka (Hellenes Polka) op. 203, at Simon's request, in 1856, for an annual ball of the ethnic Greek community in Austria-Hungary.

At his father's funeral, he told Ferenc Deák that, unlike his father—who had been a universal philanthropist—Simon wanted to use his wealth in the interests of Hungary and the Hungarian people. However, the Sinas family was not accepted by the Hungarian nobility; he tried to marry his daughters to Hungarian nobles, to Magyarize the family, but he was rejected. He also hosted a party at his castle in Gödöllő for the nobility, but almost no one attended. The Hungarian nobles didn't regard the Sinas family as their equals, dismissing them "a family of bazaar-owners". Feeling insulted, Sinas left Hungary and moved to Vienna, choosing to dedicate his wealth for the benefit of the Greek nation and the Greek state. Despite his philanthropy towards the Greek state, he never visited Greece.

Sinas became director of Austria's central bank Oesterreichische Nationalbank and established the Simon Georg Sina banking house in Vienna. Following the end of the Second Schleswig War (or German-Danish War) in 1864, he funded the return transport of Austrian forces from the region of Schleswig-Holstein. From 1874 onwards, Sinas held a position in the Herrenhaus of Austria.

Sinas was the donator and founder of the Hungarian Academy of Budapest, the Holy Trinity Greek Orthodox Church, Vienna, the Wiener Musikverein, the Metropolitan Cathedral of Sibiu, the Athens Orthodox Cathedral, the Athens Academy, and others. Sinas also supported financially the "Young Romania" student association in Vienna. His father had made the foundation of the National Observatory of Athens possible. Since Sinas was also a patron of astronomers, the crater Sinas on the Moon was named after him. He died in Vienna on 15 April 1876.
