= Konstantinos Skenderis =

Greek journalist and author

Konstantinos Skenderis (Greek: Κωνσταντίνος Σκενδέρης, 1864–1959) was a Greek journalist and author. He was born in Moscopole, modern southeast Albania, when the city was under Ottoman rule. He studied at the Phanar Greek Orthodox College.

In 1891 he moved to Korçë. From 1910 he published there the newspaper named O Pelasgos (Greek: Ο Πελασγός The Pelasgian). When his homeland came under Greek administration (Oct. 1914 – Sept. 1916), Skenderis was elected as a member of the Greek Parliament for the Korytsa Prefecture in the following elections (December 1915). From 1916 he lived in Athens where he continued to publish his newspaper until 1940.
