= St. Elijah Church, Voskopojë =

Cultural monument in Albania

St. Elijah Church
- Kisha e Shën Ilias (Albanian); Biserica Sãmtu Ayilau (Aromanian)
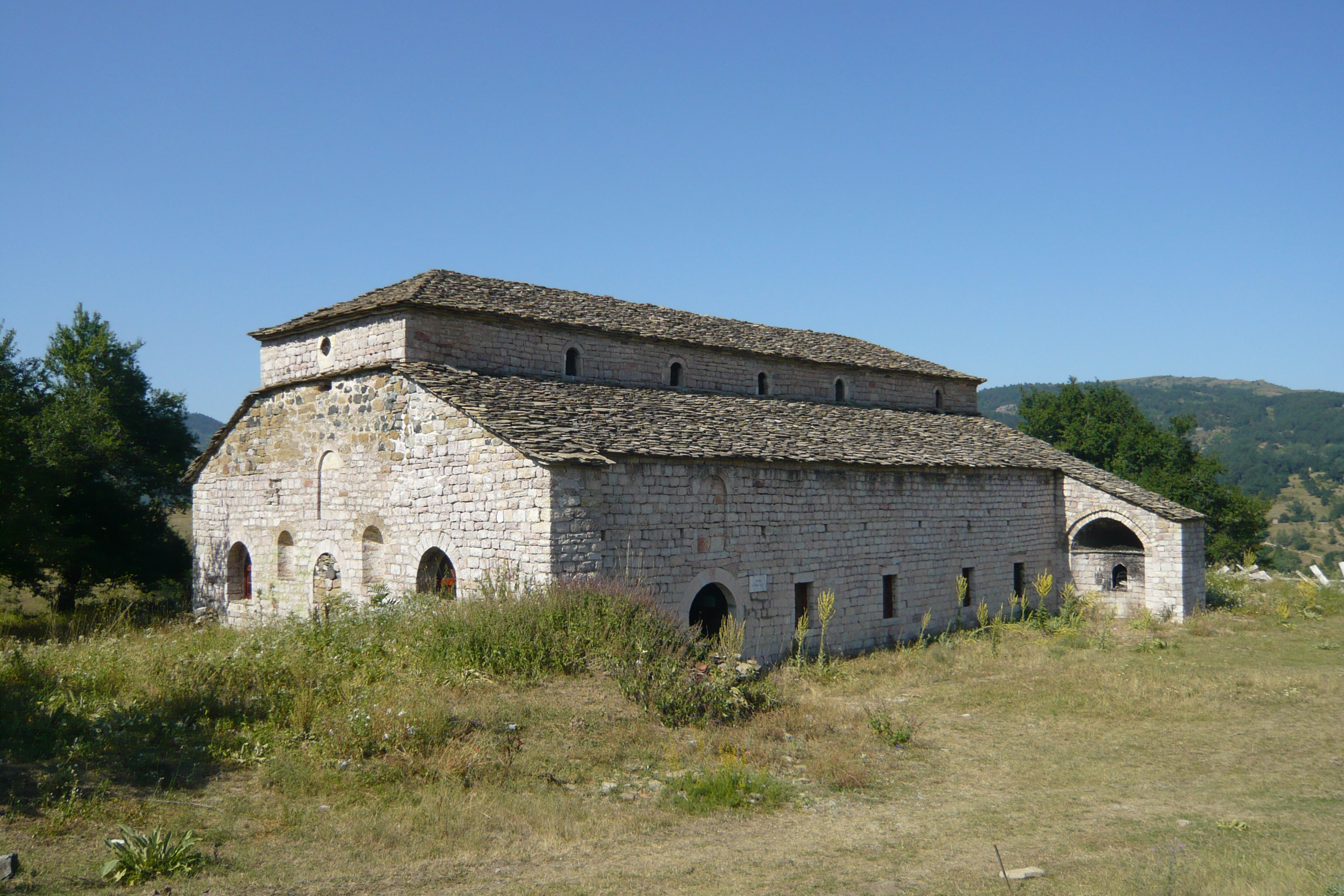
- Interactive map of St. Elijah Church
- 40.63565°N 20.58331°E
- Location: Voskopojë

Cultural Monument of Albania

The St. Elijah Church (Albanian: Kisha e Shëndëlliut or Kisha e Shën Ilias; Aromanian: Biserica Sãmtu Ayilau) is an Orthodox church in Voskopojë, Korçë County, Albania, dedicated to Saint Elijah. It is a Cultural Monument of Albania.

== History and description ==
The St. Elijah Church is 11.5m tall, 20m long, and 13m large. It has a flat ceiling on the lateral aisles. The naos is basilica-type and is divided into three aisles (the nave and the two lateral aisles) by two files of columns. The columns are made of stone and are connected by longitudinal arches, on top of which tall walls divide the aisles. The central nave is illuminated by windows that are on the lateral aisles. The cloister is on the southern side, as well as the narthex. There is no cloister on the western side. The yard of the church had walls, at the angle of which existed a bell tower, both of which have been restored.
