= St. Athanasius Church, Moscopole =

18th-century church in Albania

St. Athanasius Church, Voskopojë
- Kisha e Shën Thanasit (Albanian); Biserica Sãmtu Athanas (Aromanian)
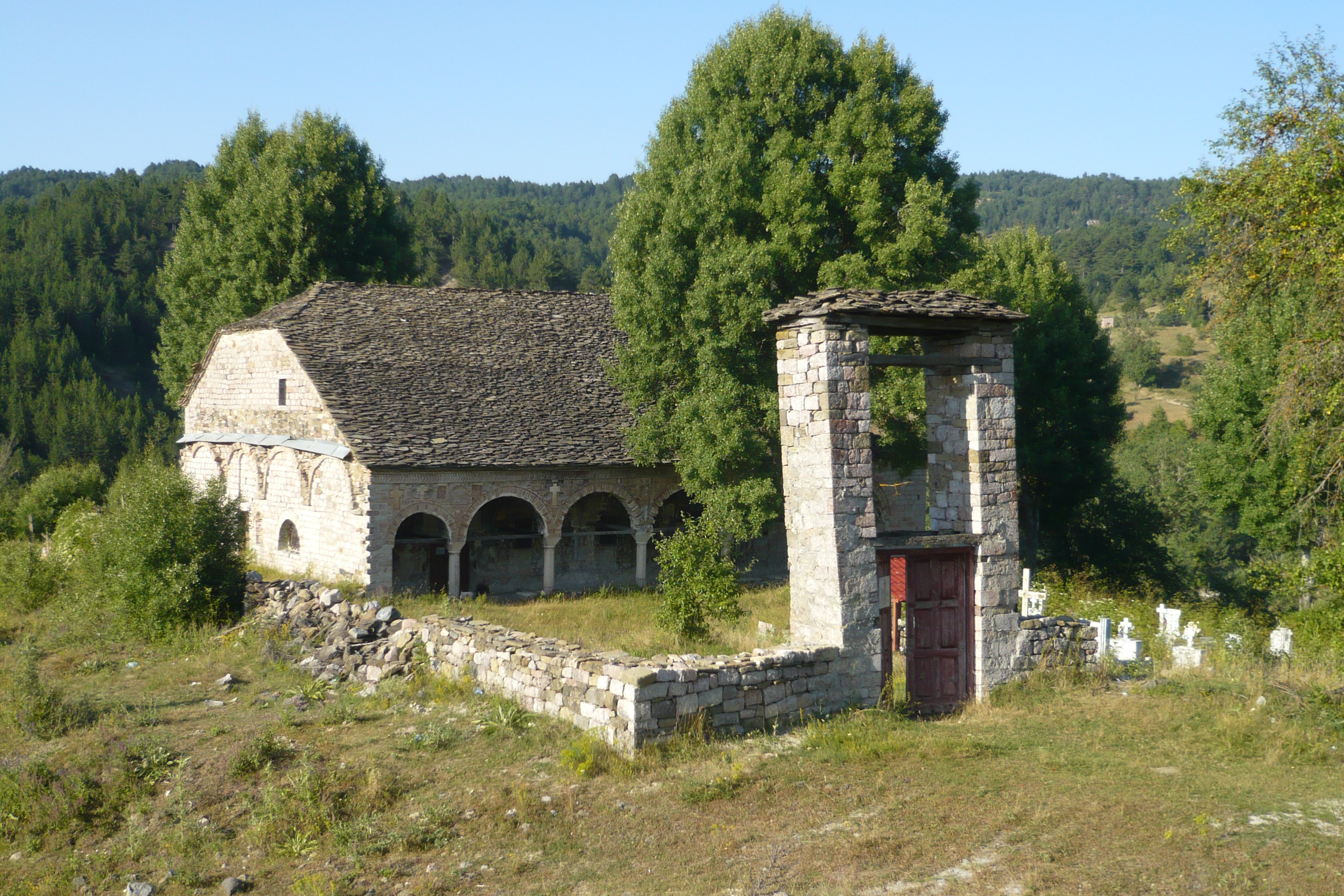
- Interactive map of St. Athanasius Church, Voskopojë
- 40.63806°N 20.58985°E
- Location: Voskopojë

Cultural Monument of Albania

The St. Athanasius Church (Albanian: Kisha e Shën Thanasit; Aromanian: Biserica Sãmtu Athanas), is an Orthodox church in Voskopojë, Albania.

== History and description ==
The church was erected in 1721. The church now serves as a cemetery church in Moscopole. It is a basilica-type church, with a central nave and two lateral aisles, and is found in the northeastern side of Voskopoja, at the Akamnel neighborhood. The church has two cupolas that stay on two main pillars and eight surrounding columns. The dimensions of the two naves are 19m x 10.50m x 8m, and the length of the cupolas goes up to 9m. The apses are decorated externally by seven arches at the main entrance and four arches ones on each side. The side arches are topped by small windows. The cloister is 18.90m long dhe 2.85m large, surrounded by 6 arches, which stand on 5 columns, each covered by a double capitals.

On the exterior frescoes of the church is featured a notably old Aromanian-language writing, discovered in 2005. The inscription is the following, written in the Greek alphabet: ΜΑΝΕ ΝΤΙ ΜΖΟΥ ΚΟΥ ΑΘΑΝΑΣΙΣ ΦΙΛΙΠΠΟΥ, in modern Aromanian spelling Mane di mzou ku Athanasis Filipu, possibly meaning "By the hand of God with Athanasis Filipu" though the interpretation of mzou is uncertain.

The church was declared a Cultural Monument of Albania. Despite this, its icons have been stolen 5 times from 1990 to 2010. The last theft removed icons painted in 1724.

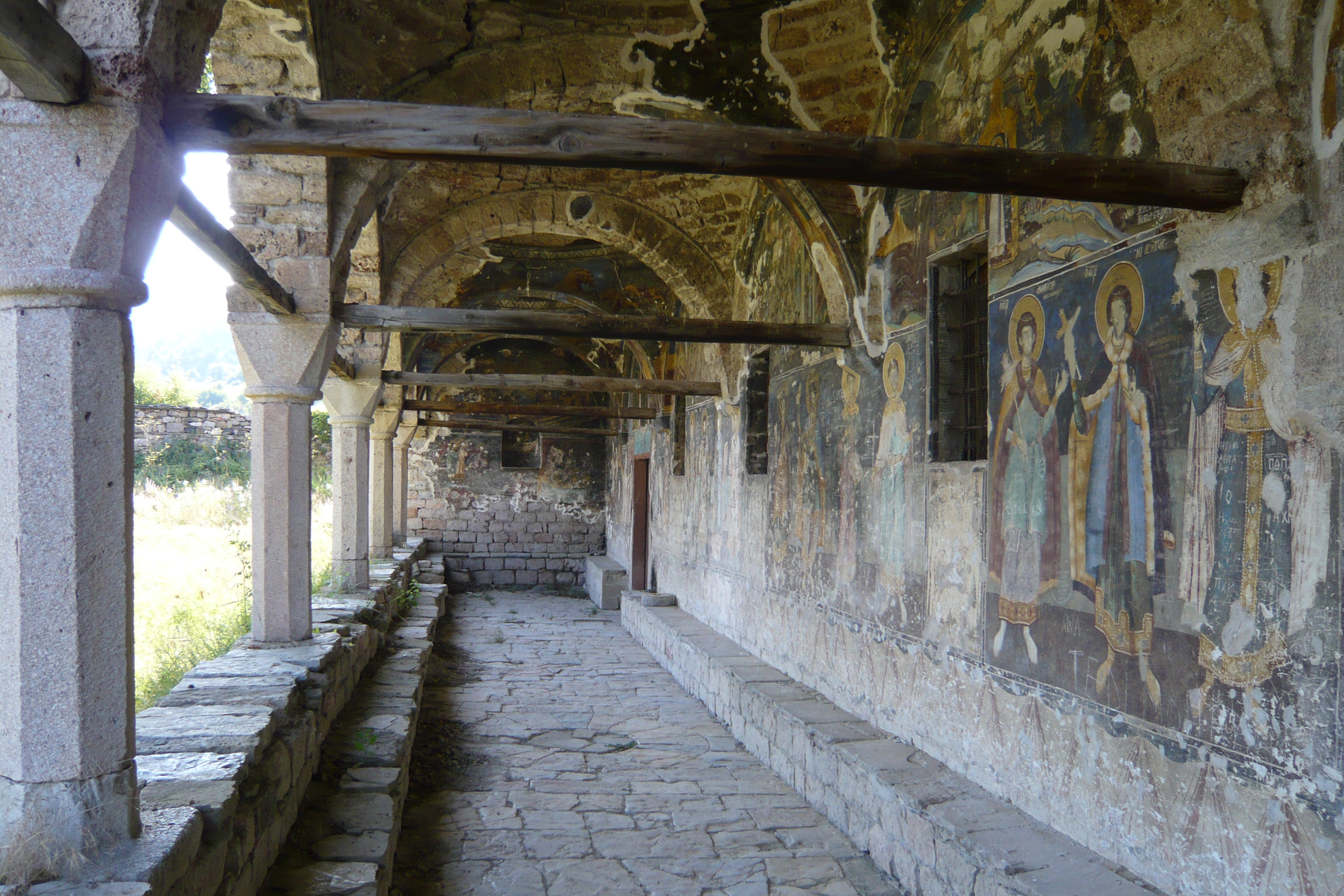
Decorated exonarthex of St. Athanasius Church
