= Georgios Sinas =

Austrian-Greek entrepreneur and banker (1783–1856)

- Γεώργιος Σίνας
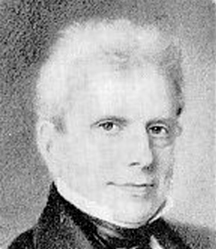
- Contemporary portrait
- Born: 20 November 1783; Niš, Ottoman Empire
- Died: 18 May 1856 (aged 72); Vienna, Austrian Empire
- Occupation: Businessman
- Known for: Banking and benefaction
- Children: Simon Sinas

Georgios Sinas (Greek: Γεώργιος Σίνας; German: Georg Sina; Romanian: Gheorghe Sina; 20 November 1783 – 18 May 1856) was an Austrian-Greek entrepreneur and banker. He became a national benefactor of Greece and Romanians, and was the father of another Greek national benefactor, Simon Sinas. He was also the founder of the National Observatory of Athens.

== Biography ==
Georgios Sinas was born in Niš, Ottoman Empire (modern-day Serbia). The Sinas family came from Moscopole, Ottoman Empire (now southern Albania). The ethnic origin of the family has been described as Aromanian, Hellenized Aromanian, or Greek. Regardless of their ethnic origin, the Sinas family in Vienna were part of the social-cultural Greek merchant class which maintained close relations with the newly founded Greek state of their era. At an early age Sinas lost his mother and was raised by his aunt in Serres (today in Greece), where he lived during his first school years. Approximately in 1790 he moved with his father, the tobacco and cotton merchant Georgios Sinas the Elder (1753–1822), to the Habsburg residence Vienna, where he finished his ground level studies. At the age of 20, he became involved with his father's businesses and managed to take initiatives and successfully expanded the family business.

He became chief director of the National bank of Austria, a position that he retained for 25 years. Moreover, he became a successful banker and subsidized not only enterprises but states and royal families in Europe. Already in 1818, he and his father were raised to Hungarian nobility by Emperor Francis I of Austria. He has contributed financially in the construction of the Chain Bridge (Budapest), the first permanent connection across the Danube between Buda and Pest, which is used even today. His name is inscribed on the base of the south western foundation of the bridge on the Buda side.

Georgios Sinas retained relations with the newly established Kingdom of Greece and in 1833 was made the ambassador of Greece to the Austrian Empire by King Otto, a position he held for the rest of his life. He financially supported the Greek community in Vienna and his family's hometown of Moscopole, modern southern Albania. Moreover, he donated huge amounts of money to philanthropic, cultural and educational institutions of the Greek state, like:

- Arsakeio school in Athens.
- University of Athens.
- A number of medical and archaeological institutions.

Sinas' greatest donation to Greece was the financing of the Athens National Observatory (1845) a work of the Danish architect Theophil Hansen. His son, Simon Sinas, continued his work on the fields of business and benefaction.

Georgios Sinas was also an important supporter of Romanian culture. He financed Romanian newspapers in Vienna, Pest, and Buda. He maintained close relations with representatives of the Transylvanian School, such as Samuil Micu, Petru Maior, and Gheorghe Șincai. He was also a friend of the future Metropolitan Andrei Șaguna, who was too of Aromanian origin. Sina carried out many acts of charity for the Romanians of Călacea, an estate he owned, including the construction of a Romanian library. During the Hungarian Revolution of 1848, as a member of the House of Magnates, he advocated for a federalization of the empire, more autonomy to the provinces, and for the national rights of the Romanians in Transylvania.
