= Ioakeim Martianos =

Ioakeim Martianos (Greek: Ιωακείμ Μαρτινιανός; 1875–1955) was a Greek Orthodox bishop and author.

Martianos was an ethnic Aromanian. He was born in Moscopole, modern southern Albania, where he acquired ground level studies. He attended the Phanar Greek Orthodox College, followed by the Halki seminary in Constantinople (modern Istanbul). Martianos was positioned at the following bishoprics:

- Berat: 1911–1924
- Paramythia: 1924–1925
- Nea Pelagonia (Ptolemaida): 1925–1942
- Kilkis: 1942–1945.
- Xanthi: 1945–1953.

Martianos also composed a voluminous treatise about his native town Moscopole. This work has been described by various scholars as one of the best analysis of the town's mid-18th century destruction, although it concentrates on the Greek features of the town.
