= St. Nicholas Church, Voskopojë =

18th-century Albanian church

- Kisha e Shën Kollit (Albanian); Biserica Ayiu Nicola (Aromanian)
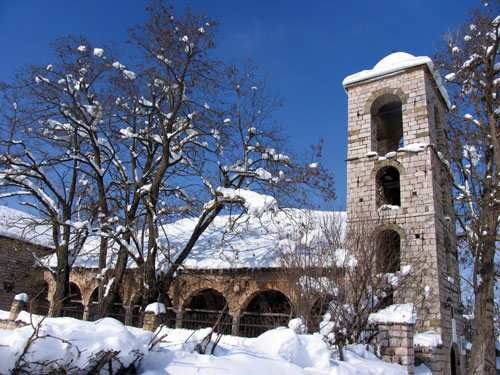
- Interactive map of St. Nicholas Church, Voskopojë
- 40.63155°N 20.58939°E
- Location: Voskopojë

Cultural Monument of Albania

The St. Nicholas Church (Albanian: Kisha e Shën Kollit; Aromanian: Biserica Ayiu Nicola) is an Orthodox church in Voskopojë, Albania. The church was erected in 1721.

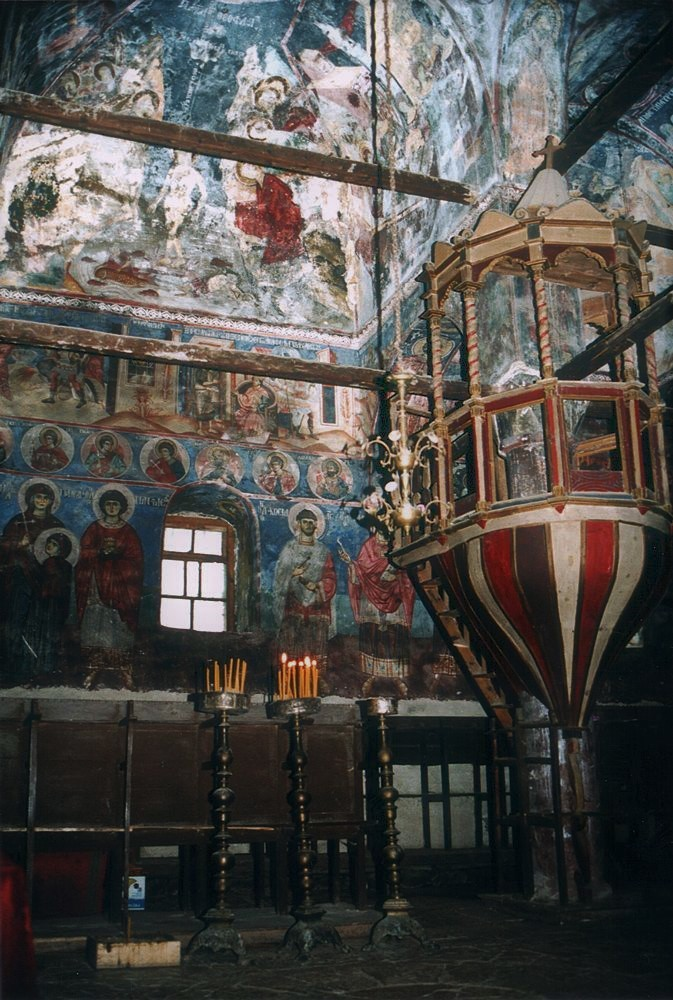
Murals in the church painted by Albanian icon painter, David Selenica

It is a Cultural Monument of Albania since 1948.

== History and description ==
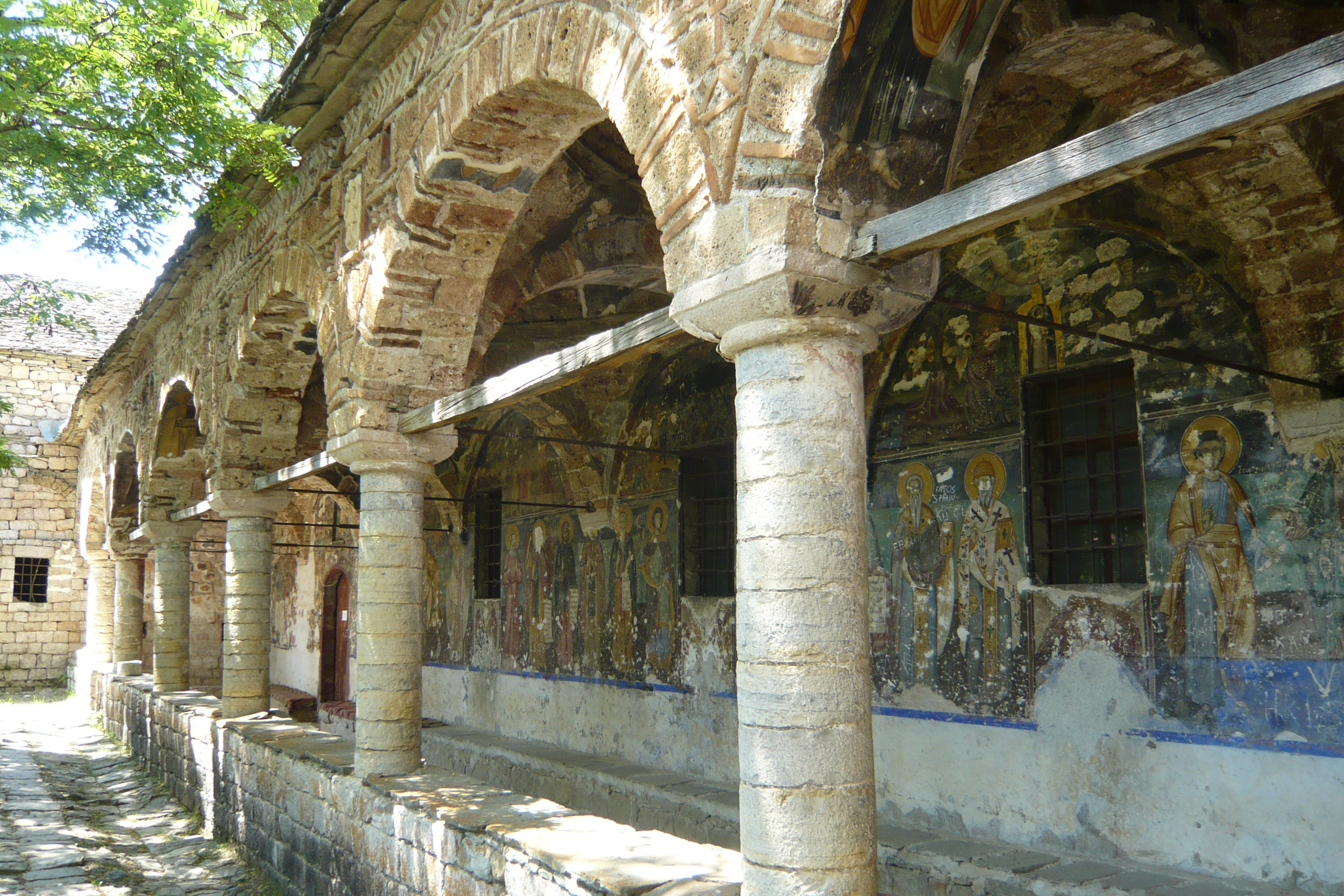
Decorated exonarthex of St. Nicholas Church

The church was built in 1721. The structure consists of a basilica-type construction Struktura with a naos covered with a cupola, a narthex and a cloister. The interiors of the church are decorated with mural paintings executed by David Selenica and his helpers Kostandin and Kristo. The art of Selenicasi is distinguished by its realistic nature, as it is witnessed by the portrait of the donor, as well as by a deep theological knowledge. According to the inscription, the portrait of the donor the painting was finished in 1726 and this was determined by an archaeologic expedition in 1953. 24 years later, in 1750, the Zografi Brothers painted the cloister.

== Liturgy ==
As of 2002, the time of the publication of a study on the Aromanians by German researcher Thede Kahl, priest Thoma was giving the Eastern Orthodox liturgy on the church in Aromanian, based on the text within the Aromanian Missal, and only thereafter in Albanian. In Aromanian, St. Nicholas is Ayiu Nicola.
