= Moscopole printing house =

Defunct printing house in Moscopole, now Albania

- Status: Defunct
- Founded: 1720/1731
- Founder: Gregory of Durrës
- Country of origin: Ottoman Empire
- Headquarters location: Moscopole
- Owner: Georgios Konstantinidis

The Moscopole printing house was an 18th-century printing house founded in Moscopole, formerly a prosperous city in the Ottoman Empire and now a village in Albania.

Moscopole is located at a distance of 21 kilometres (13 miles) from modern Korçë, in the mountains of southeastern Albania, at an altitude of 1,160 metres (3,810 feet).

== History ==
The Moscopole printing house was founded by the monk Georgios Konstantinidis. Konstantinidis, owner of the printing house, was a teacher at the New Academy of Moscopole, and he might have been the same person as Gregory of Durrës. The printing house of Moscopole was founded in 1720 or in 1731, and was the second printing house in the Balkans after that of Constantinople (now Istanbul).

The printing house of Moscopole produced religious literature and school textbooks using the Greek language. A total of twenty books can be attributed without doubt to the Moscopole printing press. They are mainly constituted by the collection of the Services to the Saints (1750) but also by the Introduction of Grammar (1760) by the local scholar Theodore Kavalliotis. The printing house had close ties with the Monastery of Saint Naum, now in North Macedonia.
