= Voskopojë =

Village and former city in southern Albania

Voskopojë Moscopole Moschopolis
- Administrative unit
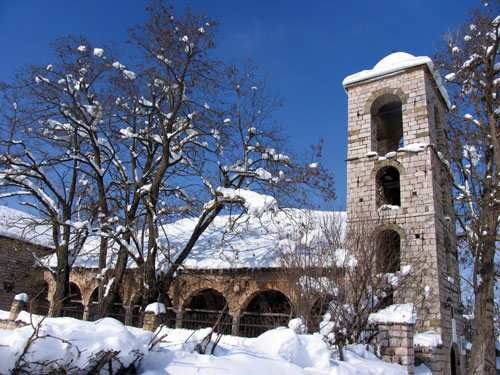
- St. Nicholas Church

- Location within Albania
- Coordinates: 40°38′0″N 20°35′25″E
- Country: Albania
- County: Korçë
- Municipality: Korçë
- Elevation: 1,160 m (3,810 ft)

Population (2011)
  - Administrative unit: 1,058
- Demonym(s): Moscopolean; Moscopolitan; Voskopojar
- Time zone: UTC+1 (CET)
  - Summer (DST): UTC+2 (CEST)
- Postal Code: 7029
- Area Code: 0864
- Website: www.voskopoja.al

Voskopoja or Moscopole is a village in Korçë County in southeastern Albania. During the 18th century, it was the cultural and commercial center of the Aromanians. At its peak, in the mid 18th century, it hosted the first printing house in the Ottoman Balkans outside Constantinople, educational institutions and numerous churches. It became a leading center of Greek culture but also with elements of Albanian and Aromanian culture, all with great influence from Western civilization.

One view attributes the decline of the city to a series of raids by Muslim Albanian bashi-bazouks. Moscopole was initially attacked and almost destroyed by those irregular groups in 1769, in retaliation for the participation of the residents in the preparations for a Greek revolt supported by the Russian Empire. Its decline culminated with the destruction of 1788 and the flight of its population. Moscopole, once a prosperous city, was reduced to a small village by Ali Pasha of Ioannina's campaign. According to another view, the city's decline was mainly due to the relocation of the trade routes in central and eastern Europe following these raids. The decline pushed parts of the population to leave, making Moscopole the original homeland of much of the Aromanian diaspora.

Today Moscopole, known as Voskopojë, is a small mountain village, and along with a few other local settlements is considered a holy place by local Orthodox Christians. Aromanians no longer form a majority of the population, with incoming Christian and Muslim Albanians having further settled in the village, especially after World War II. Still, Moscopole has held a key place within Aromanian nationalism, and many Aromanian writers have written about Moscopole in a mythical and utopian way, mourning the city's destruction, an event which gave rise to comparisons between Moscopole and Jerusalem and potrayals such as a "New Jerusalem", "New Athens" or "Arcadia of the Balkans". Greek historians have claimed the city's population as Greek, while Romanian historians have claimed it as Romanian. However, ethnic affiliations at the time were fluid; when the refugees from Moscopole moved to Austria in 1769, they declared themselves to be Macedonians, which was a geographic identity rather than an ethnic one.

== Name ==
=== Variations ===
The town is known as Voskopojë (definite form: Voskopoja) in Albanian. The Aromanian name of the town varies between Moscopole, Moscopoli, Muscopuli, Voscopole, Voscopoli and Voshopole. The Greek name of the town varies between Μοσχόπολις (transliterated into Moschópolis, Moscopolis, Moskopolis) and its vernacular equivalent form Μοσχόπολη (Moschópoli). The Βοσκόπολη/Βοσκόπολις (Voskópoli/Voskópolis/Voscopolis) variant is also used in various occasions in Greek. The town is called İskopol or Oskopol in Turkish and Москополе (Moskopole) in Bulgarian. It is known as Moscopole or Voscopole in Romanian.

The forms Voskopolis/Voskopoja derive from the Greek word Vosko (shepherd) which refers to one of the main professions performed by the Aromanian people. Also the suffix poja/polis from the syntagm can be either linked to the Greek word polis (city, citadel) or the Slavic polje, i.e. plain. Peyfuss strongly supports the latter interpretation, reasoning that this definition fits the configuration of the high plateau type terrain. According to Xhufi, it would be difficult to designate as a “plain” an isolated habitat at an altitude of 1,220 meters above sea level, preferring a link to the Greek word polis.

=== Use in historical records ===
The city appears under the Albanian rendering Voskopoja in Ottoman documents from the 16th-17th centuries. In Venetian and French commercial documents, both the forms Voscopolis and Moschopolis, the latter rendering being associated with the Aromanian-speaking population, appear to be used interchangeably. In the edicts of the Patriarch of Ohrid, the city appears under the form Moschopolis. The 18th century, author Meletios Mitros uses the form Voskopolis in his work Geography. In the Codex of the Monastery of St. John the Baptist, the Aromanian rendering Moschopolis is commonly found. This is possibly due to the scribe of the Codex, Michel the former bishop of Gorë, being a native of the neighboring village of Shipskë, itself inhabited historically by an Aromanian population. However, when it comes to archival documents transcribed into the Codex, such as decisions of the Synod of the Patriarchate of Ohrid or even of the meetings of the clergy of Moscopole, Michel seems to have preferred the form Voskopoja. This is also the case regarding the events of the years 1660–1687, in which in the agreements concluded between the monks of the monasteries, the notables and the archons of the three districts of the city, the name of the city is given in the form Voskopoja.

Thus, the use of the forms Voskopoja/Moschopolis is not a certain conclusion of ethnic and social belonging, as even in the part of the Codex written by the hand of the Aromanian Michel, we nevertheless find cases where he also uses the form Voskopoja. What can be said with certainty is that both forms experienced cases of interchangeable usage, which is a strong indication of a long cohabitation and a close integration of the two communities. This may indicate that, at the time, except for the religious hierarchy and the documentation it produced, the name "Voskopoja" was very common among the lay population, and even among the lower clergy. Furthermore, Albanian surnames such as Ngushta, Vrusho and Krunde are found among the signatories of the agreement mentioned above, which represented the three districts of the city, perhaps the districts inhabited mainly by Albanians.

== Geography ==
Modern Moscopole is located 21 km from Korçë, in the mountains of southeastern Albania, at an altitude of 1160 meters, and is a subdivision of Korçë municipality; its population in 2011 was 1,058. The municipality of Moscopole consists of the villages of Moscopole, Shipskë, Krushovë, Gjonomadh and Lavdar. In 2005, the municipality had a population of 2,218, whereas the settlement itself has a population of around 500.

== History ==
=== Beginnings ===
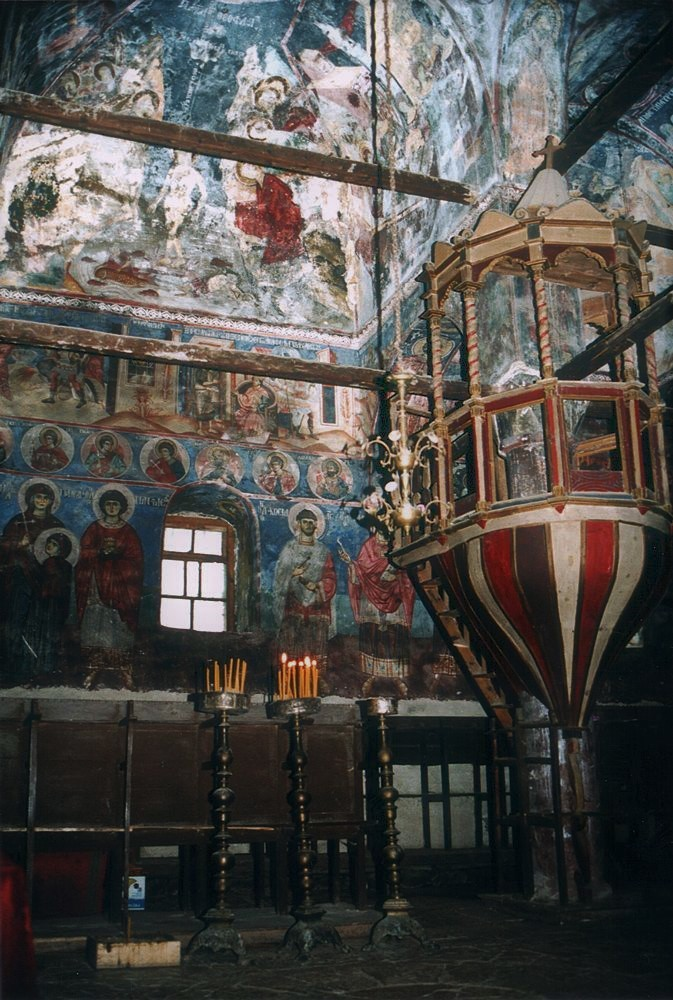
Murals of the St. Nicholas Church, painted by David Selenica

Pouqueville identified Moscopole with the citadel of Museion, one of the 46 fortresses that, according to Procopius of Caesarea, Emperor Justinian I (527–565) had built in the province of Macedonia to defend against barbarian attacks. However, to this day, there is no trace of ancient construction in this place, albeit the area has not been excavated, not even in archaeological surveys. But, in the absence of the latter, it can be said that Moscopole was an inner trade node which, at least since the Byzantine period, linked the Korça basin to Berat, Vlora and Durrës. It would therefore be difficult to think that Justinian I would not have undertaken military fortifications in the area, which formed a corridor that in the future would be one of the most important passageways through which the migrating Slavic populations coming from Macedonia and moving towards the West entered.

The existence of Moscopole should not have escaped the chronicler Gjon Muzaka. Having left Albania in 1478, he describes in detail all the surrounding villages, including Voskop which, at the time of his writing in 1510, was according to him abandoned "una terra che si chiama Vescop, la quale è distrutta". In the case of Voskop mentioned by Muzaka it is probably the modern village with the name, located at the foot of the heights that lead to Moscopole. Muzaka seems to link Voskop to a still flat land when he asserts that Voskop was part of what he calls "paese di Devoli maggiore", therefore the Greater Devoll region. However, in another passage of his chronicle, Muzaka mentions Voskop again, but this time adding to it the name Beci, a village in the Opar zone proper "Voscopebeci". In the latter case, not only the unification with Beci of the heights of Opar, but also the fact of having included it in the same context with other known villages of this area, such as Dushkar, Lavdar, Marian and Opar, suggest that it may be Moscopole (in the mountains) and not Voskop (in the plain). This may represent a typical case of the existence of two nearby settlements bearing the same name, something also observable in nearby Moscopole: Upper Goskova and Lower Goskova, located to the east of the settlement. This theory is further supported by the fact that Muzaka distinguishes several times between agglomerations and individual settlements, sometimes doing this for settlements which in later periods came to form one settlement, such as the case of Drago and Stagna, modern Dragostunjë.

At the current state of knowledge, an ancient existence of Moscopole can only be assumed. As for its appearance in the pre-Ottoman Middle Ages, an affirmation of Johann Georg von Hahn, in which he recounts having read a codex of Moscopole in 1843, during his tenure as consul of Austria-Hungary. In it, he describes having read that the city was founded in 1338 by the head of the Muzaka family. It is unclear as to what codex Hahn is referring to. The Codex of the monastery of Saint-Prodrome in Moscopole, does affirm in its introductory part that the monastery in question was built in 1630, "two hundred and fifty or three hundred years after the foundation of the town of Moscopole itself", indicating that the latter must have been founded around the year 1330. However, this codex does not link the founding of Moscopole to the Muzaka family, as asserted by Hahn, who has probably consulted another unknown and possibly lost codex. Moreover, the fact is that the Codex of Saint-Prodrome, published by Ioakeim Martianos in 1939, makes several mentions of another older codex which he calls "the old codex" or “the great codex”, on the indications of which relied the monk Michel, who wrote in 1779 the second, newer codex known today. Subject to any reservations as to the possibility of an ancient or paleo-Byzantine substratum of the site, it is likely that Moscopole has existed, at least since the 14th century, in its initial function of pastoral agglomeration.

Moscopole continued to retain the appearance of a typically pastoral settlement even when it began to be covered by Ottoman documentation. The register for the year 1568/9 indicates that agricultural activity had already begun alongside that of stockbreeding. However, the Sigils of Berat retain two firmans of Sultan Ibrahim, of the year 1647, where the latter ordered the local authorities of Vlora not to impose arbitrary taxes and obligations on "the rayah of Moscopole" who were, according to him, "nomadic shepherds" and who "since their elders, each year, arrived with their sheep to the winter pastures of the sanjak of Vlora”.

=== Economy ===
In the middle of the 17th century, the inhabitants of Moscopole were still largely "nomadic herders" who moved with their flocks from summer pastures in Moscopole to those of the Sanjak of Avlona during the winter. It is precisely there that their conflict with the authorities of the Sanjak of Avlona started, as the sanjak's authorities started demanding fictitious or arbitrarily-increased taxes, which led them to complain to the Sublime Porte. However, only a few decades later, in 1700, the inhabitants of Moscopole had complained again to the Sultan, but this time because of the looting of their caravan in the Kaza of Tomorrica of the Sanjak of Avlona, where they usually passed to trade with their pastoral activity, which continued to be an important economic activity, and was therefore superimposed on commercial activity of these inhabitants: henceforth, it was the merchants of Moscopole who complained of raids on their caravans directed towards the ports of Durrës, Vlorë, etc.. It is not by chance that this change of status in the Ottoman system of land ownership corresponds to the period of the flourishing of Moscopole.

Historically, the main economic activity of the city was livestock farming. This activity led to the establishment of wool processing and carpet manufacturing units and the development of tanneries, while other locals became metal workers and silver and copper smiths. During the middle of the 18th century, the city became an important economic center whose influence spread over the boundaries of the Archbishopric of Ohrid, and reached further the Ottoman-ruled Eastern Orthodox world. This trade involved as far as the Archduchy of Austria, the Kingdom of Hungary, and the Upper Saxony. Until 1769, the town traded on a large scale with renowned European commercial centres of that time, such as Venice, Vienna and Leipzig.

=== Growth ===
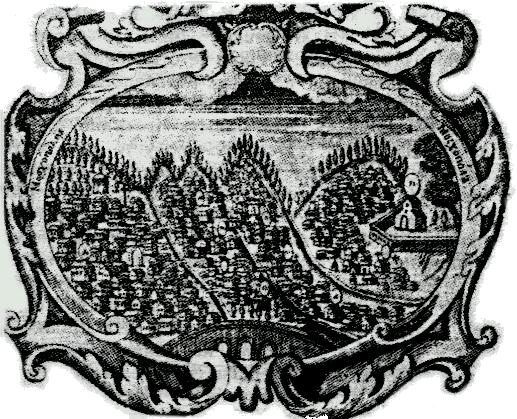
The old coat of arms of Moscopole

Sources are divided in considering Moscopole as a city in the proper sense of the term. Indeed, in 1770, a priest from Moscopole felt proud to call it a city when giving evidence before foreign authorities in Hungary (Moscopolis urbs Albaniae). In 1791, the geographers Philippides and Konstantas also qualify it as a city. But the geographer Meletios, who predated them and was writing at Moscopole's peak in 1728, calls Moscopole a town (πολισμα). If referring to a local and more reliable source, the Codex of the monastery of Saint-Prodrome, its author Michel of Shipska (1779) still qualifies Moscopole as a village (ή χώρα Μοσχόπολις). However, the word hora often was used to mean place, without specifying whether it is a village, a city or an entire region. On the other hand, in the Codex of the monastery of Saint-Prodrome, various documents were transcribed ranging from different periods, be they deeds of sale and purchase of properties, deeds of donation, and even some synodal decisions of the Patriarchate of Ohrid. One of the latter, from 1686, describes Moscopole as a politeia (πολιτεία), which brings it closer in meaning to a city proper, but without explicitly identifying it as one. In his work Faith, published in Venice in 1732, Nektar Terpo, a native of Moscopole, attributes both names to this city. Speaking of certain archons of the city who worked to gain power by unjust means, he specifies for his part that these people were not liked by both the country and the city (ή χώρα καί πολιτεία). This gives credence to the translation of 'hora as a neutral name that could mean either village or country, regardless of its size and its economic and social typology. With regard to the other name given to Μoscopole, πολιτεία, as per the examples above, this word likely designated the community of Moscopole as a politically organized entity which as such maintained relations with other entities.

Although known in Europe, Moscopole was nevertheless considered only a village (dorf) being referred to as such in an official Austrian document from 1716, therefore from the period were its growth had already started. However, the extent of the information and knowledge that the Habsburg Empire had of this center located in the middle of the mountains of Albania remains to be clarified. For an early 18th century Austrian, Hungarian or Venetian, Moscopole was the exotic homeland of skillful, but somewhat rough and rude merchants who supplied their markets with wool, skins and wax, particularly sought after in the specific conditions of the 17th-18th centuries. Along with agriculture, animal husbandry remained a vital part of the economic activity of Moscopole. The mountain above the monastery of Saint Prodrome continued to serve as a pasture for the inhabitants of the area, even when the aspect of a craft and commercial town had become predominant in relation to its historically pastoral profile. The Codex of this monastery explicitly attests that at the end of the 17th century, butter, cheese and other livestock products were still the foodstuffs by which dues were paid or donations were made to it.

A printing press operated in Moscopole, which produced religious literature and school textbooks in Greek. It was the second printing press in Ottoman Europe to be established after that of Constantinople, having been founded by monk Georgios Konstantinidis. This establishment produced a total of nineteen books, mainly the collection of the Services to the Saints but also the Introduction of Grammar by the local scholar Theodore Kavalliotis. All locally printed books were exclusively written in Greek with the indication En Moschopolei. Claims by some Balkan scholars about the possible existence of multilingual prints or prints in Albanian, Aromanian or Slavic have not been verified. Kavalliotis later became director of the city's prestigious educational institution, which from 1744 was known as New Academy or Hellenikon Frontistirion, sponsored by wealthy foreign merchants. This institution became one of the leading centers of learning for Orthodox Christians in western Balkans. The language of education was Greek while renowned Greek teachers were invited to provide lessons.

The city also hosted an orphanage, known as Orphanodioiketerion, possibly the first in the post-Byzantine Orthodox world; and also a hospital and a total of 24 churches.

A cultural effervescence arose in Moscopole, and many authors published their works in both the Greek language (which was the language of culture of the Balkans at the time) and Aromanian, written in the Greek alphabet. In 1770, the first dictionary of four modern Balkan languages (Greek, Albanian, Aromanian and Bulgarian) was published here. Daniel Moscopolites, an Aromanian native priest of Moscopole, compiled a quadrilingual lexicon of Greek, Aromanian, Bulgarian and Albanian, that aimed at the Hellenization of the non-Greek-speaking Christian communities in the Balkans. Due to the high level of intellectual activity and Greek education, Moscopole was nicknamed as New Athens or New Mystra. As such, the city became an important 18th century center of the modern Greek Enlightenment.

The Aromanian Missal, an 18th-century liturgical book in Aromanian, was likely written in Moscopole. The authors of the Codex Dimonie, a collection of Aromanian-language biblical texts translated from Greek, may have also originated from Moscopole.

Greek historians have claimed the city's population as Greek, while Romanian historians have claimed it as Romanian. However, ethnic affiliations at the time were fluid, and someone could simultaneously be an Aromanian, Roman (meaning Eastern Orthodox Christian), Ottoman and Moscopolitan. Moscopole was not a Greek city in the modern sense of the word. Its merchants were Aromanian-speakers who, like all Balkan merchants, learned Greek as a language of regional commerce. Thus, when the refugees from Moscopole moved to Austria in 1769, they declared themselves to be Macedonians, which was a geographic identity rather than an ethnic one.

=== Destruction and decline ===
Dictionary of four Balkan languages (Greek, Aromanian, Bulgarian and Albanian), written by Daniel Moscopolites

The 1769 sacking and pillaging by Muslim Albanian troops was just the first of a series of attacks to the city. Moscopole was attacked due to the participation of the residents in the preparations for a Greek revolt supported by the Russian Empire known as the Orlov Revolt. Its destruction culminated with the razing of 1788 by the troops of Ali Pasha of Ioannina. Moscopole was practically destroyed by this attack, with some of its commerce shifting to nearby Korçë and Berat.

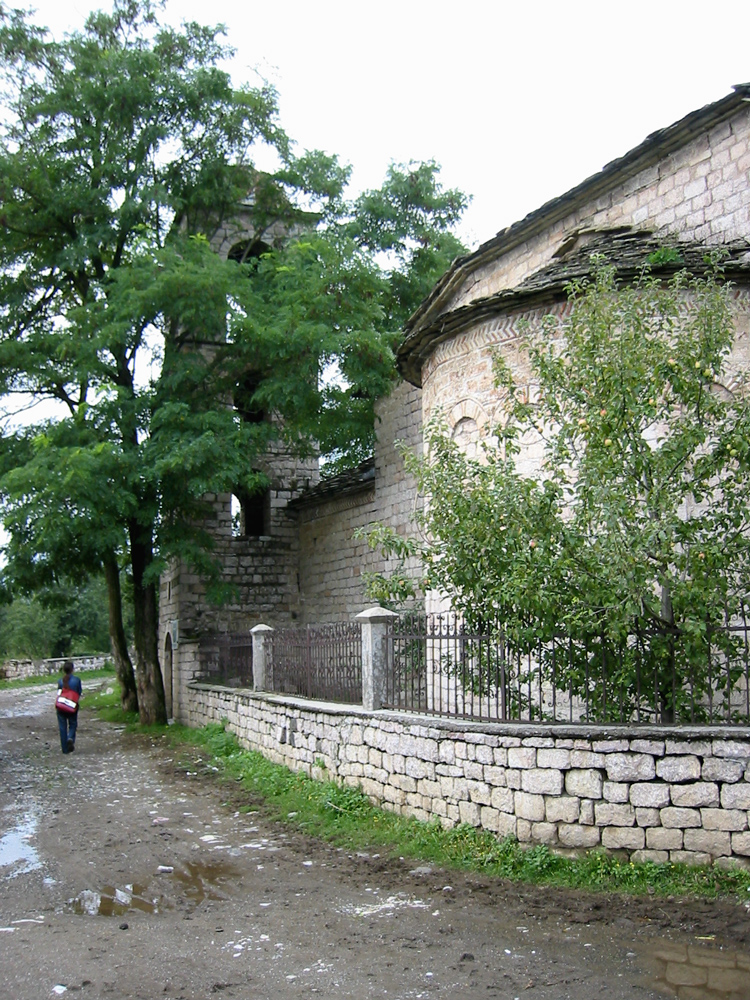
Image of the St. Nicholas Church

The survivors were thus forced to flee, most of them emigrating mainly to Thessaly and Macedonia. Orthodox Albanians from Moscopole which migrated in the beginning of the 19th century to Kruševo would found the so called Ohtul di Arbinesh (Hill of the Albanians) neighbourhood. This community would soon assimilate into the Aromanian population of the city. A number of the Orthodox Albanian families from the city also settled in the city of Prilep during the beginning of the 19th century. There they formed a small but notable community, before eventually assimilating into the Bulgarian and to a lesser extent Greek corpus. Some of the commercial elite moved to the Archduchy of Austria, and the Kingdom of Hungary, especially to the respective capitals of Vienna and Budapest, but also to Transylvania, where they had an important role in the early national awakening of Romania. The city never rose back to its earlier status. However, a new school was established at the end of the 18th century whose headmaster in 1802 was Daniel Moscopolites. This school functioned the following decades, thanks to donations and bequests by baron Simon Sinas. The diaspora of Moscopole located in Austria and Hungary continued the tradition of their ancestors by sponsoring institutions beneficial to the Greek people. During this period, many members of the Aromanian diaspora who migrated to Budapest and Vienna started developing a unique Aromanian identity, being one of the first Aromanian populations to do so. These cities became gathering centers for Aromanians and Aromanian language and culture was promoted.

The destruction of Moscopole and the expulsion of Aromanians from the city in 1768 gave rise to the legend of the city, originating comparisons between Moscopole and Jerusalem and potrayals such as a "New Jerusalem", "New Athens" or "Arcadia of the Balkans". With the destruction of the city and the birth of Aromanian literature, many Aromanian writers, predominantly those young Aromanians educated in Romanian schools, began to write about Moscopole in a utopian way, with feelings and elements such as love, nostalgia, superstitions, mentalities, emotions and everyday aspects of life being predominant. Depression and nostalgia for the city became the main feelings in this Aromanian literary phenomenon. Romanian historian Sorin Antohi described the Aromanian elites engaging in this utopic literary discourse about Moscopole as having an exalted feeling of finding of a "magnetic beauty and without any imperfection of a brilliant city" which "evokes a dreamlike image". The founder of this Aromanian literary trend was Leon Boga, but it also includes works by Nicolae Constantin Batzaria, Nicolae Caratană, Ion Foti, Kira Mantsu and Nicolae Velo.

In 1914, Moscopole was part of the Autonomous Republic of Northern Epirus. The now village was destroyed again in 1916 during World War I by the Albanian çeta band of Sali Butka, who set Moscopole on fire and killed a number of local civilians. Butka is considered among Aromanian circles as a criminal due to this event. This incident was followed by the looting of the village's churches by French soldiers belonging to the administration of the Autonomous Province of Korçë.

During the Greco-Italian War, on 30 November 1940, the town was captured by the advancing Greek forces. In April 1941, after the capitulation of Greece, Moscopole returned to Axis control. The remaining buildings were razed three times during the partisan warfare of World War II: once by Italian troops and twice by the Albanian nationalist Balli Kombëtar organization. Fifteen partisans from Moscopole died during the war. In their honor, a lapidar was erected in the village with the names of the partisans engraved.

Of the old city, six Orthodox churches (one in a very ruined state), a bridge and a monastery survive.

=== Modern times ===
In 1996, the church of Saint Michael was vandalized by Albanian adolescents under the influence of a foreign Muslim fundamentalist, an incident that shocked and dismayed the Albanian public. In 2002, the five standing churches were put on the World Monuments Fund's 2002 World Monuments Watch. Today, Moscopole is just a small mountain village and ski resort. During recent years, a Greek language institution and a joint Greek–Albanian initiative has operated in Moscopole.

== Demographics ==
=== Early period ===
The first Ottoman register of the area of Korça and Permet at the end of the 14th century does not mention Moscopole, and also omittes many of the surrounding villages in the region mountain range of Opar. However, this document can not serve as a basis for drawing a conclusion on the existence of the settlement at that time as the mountainous region of Opar had not yet been fully conquered by the Ottoman Empire and as such the region was not of interest to the register. The summary register of Rumelia of years 1520-1530 includes the nahiyes of Ohrid, Beral (Vlora) and of Elbasan, while omitting the kaza of Korça (which included Moscopole), which from that time onwards was placed under the dependence of the nahiyah of Monastir. However, it lists villages in the area more to the north, those of Maliq and the Gora, such as Marian, Niça, Shkoza, Manastirica, Maliq, Symiza, Këmbëthekra, all villages located in the north of Moscopole. Oso is the only village in the Opar region that appears on this register. Moscopole appears with certainty a few decades later in the Great Register bonds of the kaza of Korça, Bilisht and Krupishta of the year 1568/9, as a rural settlement with 330 household heads. Later, from 1647, it appears in documents Ottomans as a prerogative (mülk) of the Sultan's mother.

The other Ottoman summary register, that of the year 1668/9, does not mention Moscopole, but the kaza of Korça to which Moscopole also belonged. The kaza of Korça appears there as the kaza which had the largest number of inns listed (569) within the framework of the sandjak of Rumelia (Monastir). Even if one attributed to Moscopole the majority of these 569 inns, compared to the register of a century earlier, that of 1568/9 which mentions 330 household heads, a noticeable growth is not evident, likely meaning Moscopole had yet to experience the massive growth it would become known for.

=== City ===
Although located in a rather isolated place in the mountains of southern Albania, the city rose to become the most important center of the Aromanians. Many of its inhabitants originated from the southern parts of Epirus, such as the settlements of Skamneli and Metsovo (Aminciu, an Aromanian settlement as well) in northwestern Greece. It was a small settlement until the end of the 17th century, but afterwards showed a remarkable financial and cultural development. Some writers have claimed that Moscopole in its glory days (1730–1760) had as many as 70,000 inhabitants; other estimates placed its population closer to 35,000; but a more realistic number may be closer to 3,500. According to Max Demeter Peyfuss, "the truth may be closer to this number [sc. 3500] than to 70,000. Moschopolis was certainly not among the largest Balkan cities of the 18th century".

Following the first fatal blow suffered around the middle of the 18th century, the city was reduced to a degraded agglomeration with some 200 houses. It continued to be so even at the dawn of modern times. According to the Swedish historian Johann Thunmann, who visited Moscopole and wrote a history of the Aromanians in 1774, everyone in the city spoke Aromanian; many also spoke Greek, which was used for writing contracts. In fact the city is said to have been mainly populated by Aromanians. The fact was confirmed by a 1935 analysis of family names that showed that in the 18th century the majority of the population were indeed Aromanians, but there were also Greeks, Albanians and Bulgarians present in the city.

=== Decline ===
In 1894, Gustav Weigand, a researcher who was interested in the populations of the Balkans, visited Moscopole which he describes as a village (Dorf) of only 220 families, half of whom were Albanian and the other half Aromanian.

In 1900, a report by the Greek consul Betsos gave details of the demographic composition of Moscopole. It noted that the 18th century destruction of the settlement resulted in the dispersal of its Aromanian population and that some old remaining families moved to other places, in particular Korçë. Around 30 old families remained, with the socio-political crisis that engulfed the nearby Opar region resulting in Albanian Christians leaving their previous homes and settling in Moscopole. Aromanians from two nearby settlements also resettled in Moscopole. In 1900, Moscopole was populated by a total of 200 families, consisting of 120 Albanian and 80 Aromanian families. Most of the older Aromanian families had a Greek national consciousness while 3 families along with some of the newer residents were pro-Romanian (from a total of 20 older families), led by an unfrocked priest named Kosmas.

=== Modern times ===
Moscopole, known in Albania as being a traditionally Christian settlement, is a neighbour to various Muslim and Christian Albanian villages that surround it, although the latter ones have become "demographically depressed" due to migration. During the communist period, some Muslims from surrounding villages settled in Moscopole, making locals view the village population as mixed (i përzier) and lamenting the decline of the Christian element.

In modern times, Aromanians no longer form a majority of the population, with incoming Christian and Muslim Albanians having further settled in the village, especially after the Second World War.

== Orthodox churches and monasteries ==
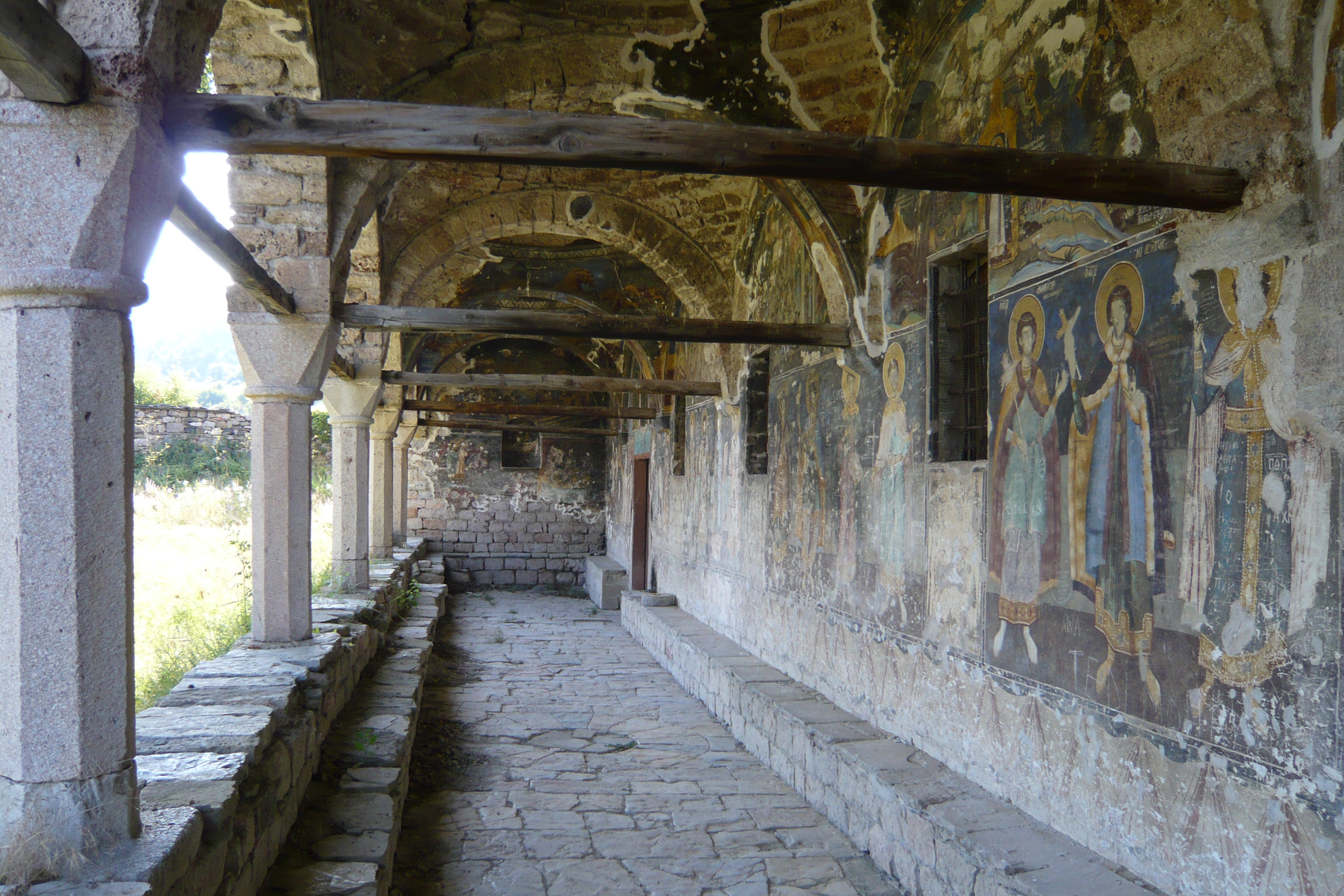
Decorated exonarthex of the St. Athanasius Church

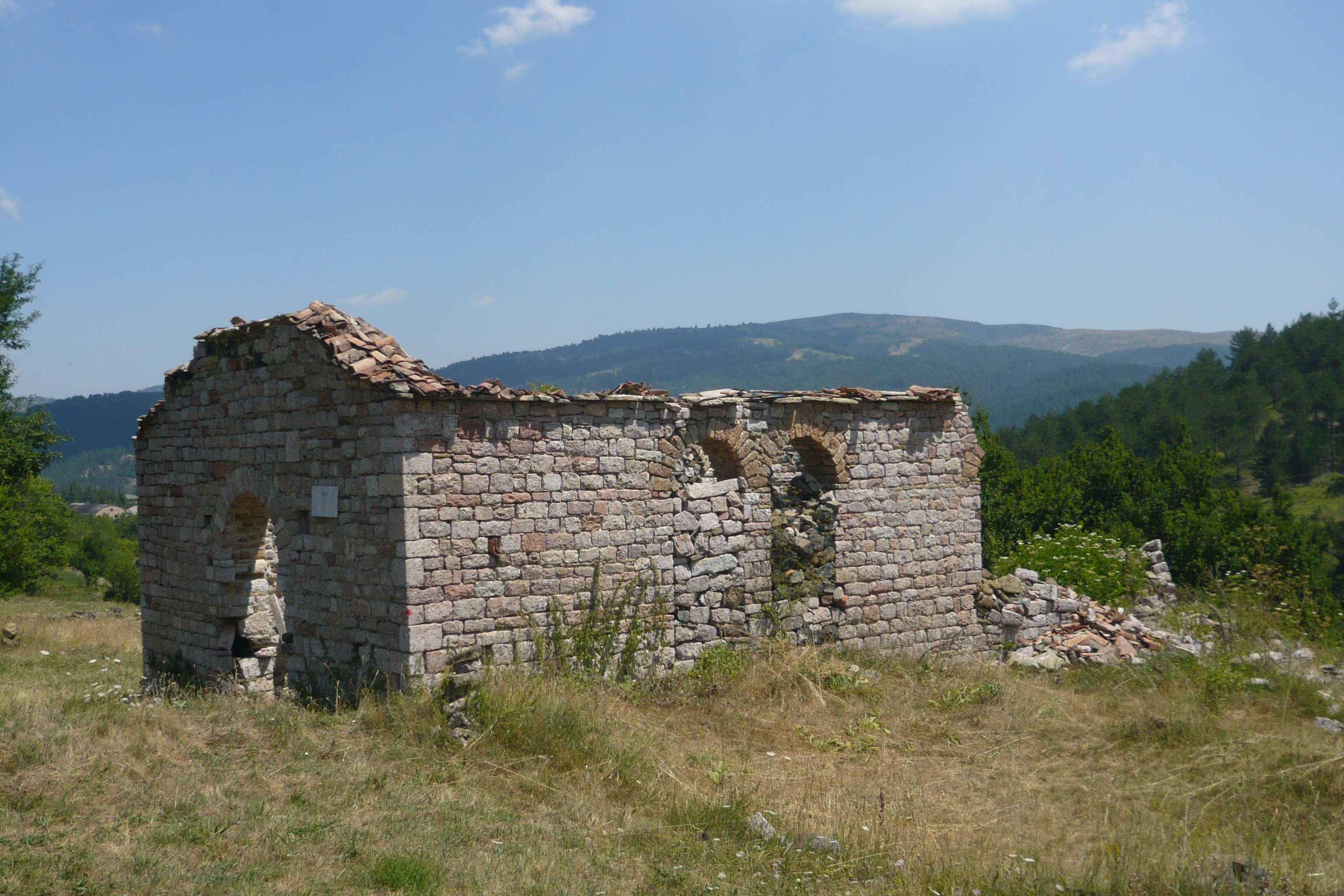
The ruined St. Charalampus Church

The remaining churches in the region are among the most representative of 18th century ecclesiastical art in the Balkans. Characteristically, their murals are comparable to that in the large monastic centres at Mount Athos and Meteora, both in Greece. The architectural design is in general specific and identical: a large three-aisled basilica with a gable roof. The churches are single-apsed, with a wide altar apse and internal niches that serve as prothesis and diaconicon. Most churches also have one niche, each on the northern and southern walls, next to the prothesis and the diaconicon. Along the southern side there is an arched porch.

Of the original around 24–30 churches of Moscopole, besides the St. John the Baptist Monastery (Albanian: Manastiri i Shën Prodhromit or Manastiri i Shën Gjon Pagëzorit; Greek: Μονή Αγίου Ιωάννου του Προδρόμου) in the vicinity of the town, only five have survived into modern times:

- Saint Athanasius (Albanian: Kisha e Shën Thanasit; Aromanian: Biserica Sãmtu Athanas; Greek: Ναός Αγίου Αθανασίου)
- Saint Elijah (Albanian: Kisha e Shën Ilias; Aromanian: Biserica Sãmtu Ayilau; Greek: Ναός Προφήτη Ηλία)
- Saint Mary (Albanian: Kisha e Shën Mërisë; Aromanian: Biserica Stã Mãria; Greek: Ναός Κοιμήσεως της Θεοτόκου)
- Saint Michael or Archangels Michael and Gabriel (Albanian: Kisha e Shën Mëhillit; Greek: Ναός Αγίων Ταξιαρχών)
- Saint Nicholas (Albanian: Kisha e Shën Kollit; Aromanian: Biserica Ayiu Nicola; Greek: Ναός Αγίου Νικολάου)

Some of the ruined churches include the following:

- Saint Paraskevi (Albanian: Kisha e Shën Premtes; Aromanian: Biserica Stã Vinãra; Greek: Ναός Αγίας Παρασκευής), patron saint of the town and probably the first church built in Moscopole in the 15th century
- Saint Charalampus (Albanian: Kisha e Shën Harallambit; Aromanian: Biserica Sãmtu Haralamb; Greek: Ναός Αγίου Χαραλάμπους), outer walls partially survived
- Saint Euthymius, completely destroyed.

== Notable people ==
People born in Moscopole:

- Ioannis Chalkeus (1667–between 1730 and 1740), scholar and philosopher
- Theophrastos Georgiadis (1885–1973), author and teacher
- Nicolae Ianovici, linguist
- Theodore Kavalliotis (1718–1789), priest and teacher
- Georgios Konstantinidis, hieromonk and founder of the Moscopole printing house
- Dionysios Mantoukas (1648–1751), Orthodox bishop
- Violeta Manushi (1926–2007), actress
- Ioakeim Martianos (1875–1955), Orthodox bishop
- Daniel Moscopolites (1754–1825), scholar
- Konstantinos Skenderis (1864–1959), journalist and author
- Nektarios Terpos (late 17th century–18th century), religious scholar and monk
- Konstantinos Tzechanis (1740–1800), philosopher, mathematician and poet
- Constantin Ucuta, academic and protopope in Prussia
- Iuliu Valaori (1867–1936), politician, professor and writer

Others with roots in Moscopole:

- Mihail G. Boiagi (1780–1828, 1842 or 1843), grammarian and professor
- Duka de Kádár family, with notable members of this family including Géza Duka de Kádár (1867–1913) and Peter Duka von Kadar (1756–1822)
- Llazar Fundo (1899–1944), communist politician, journalist and writer
- Emanoil Gojdu (1802–1870), lawyer
- Mocioni family, with notable members of this family including Andrei Mocioni (1812–1880)
- Max Demeter Peyfuss (1944–2019), historian, translator and writer
- Anastasios Pichion (1836–1913), educator and revolutionary
- Victor Ponta (born 1972), jurist and politician, former Prime Minister of Romania
- Sandër Prosi (1920–1985), film and theater actor and violin player; his father was from Moscopole
- Agim Shuke (1942–1992), actor, and his son Orli Shuka (born 1976), also actor; the Shuka family originated from Moscopole
- Sina family, with notable members of this family including Georgios Sinas (1783–1856) and Simon Sinas (1810–1876)
- Konstantinos Smolenskis (1843–1915), Hellenic Army officer
- Leonidas Smolents (1806–1882), military officer
- Tzon Sossidis (1924–2005), diplomat and politician
- Lazaros Tsamis (1878–1933), merchant and Macedonian Struggle fighter
- Andreas Tzimas (1909–1972), communist politician and resistance soldier; his mother was from Moscopole

== Gallery ==
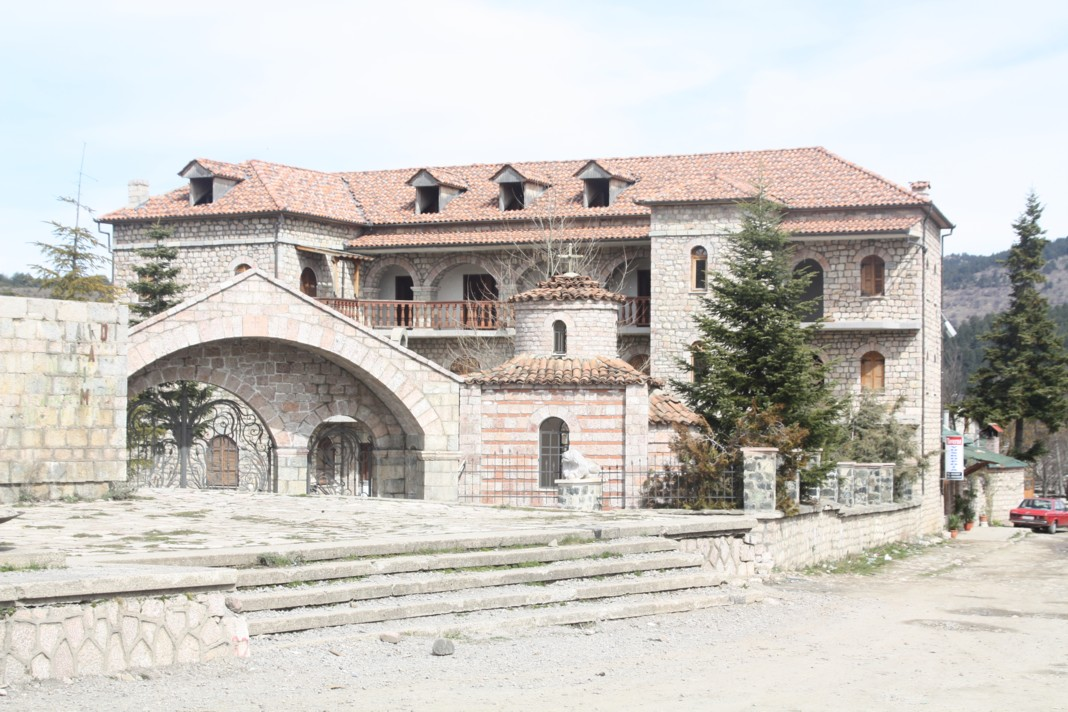
Tourist center

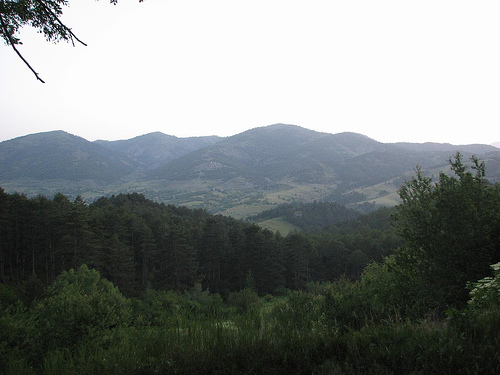
Mountains near Moscopole

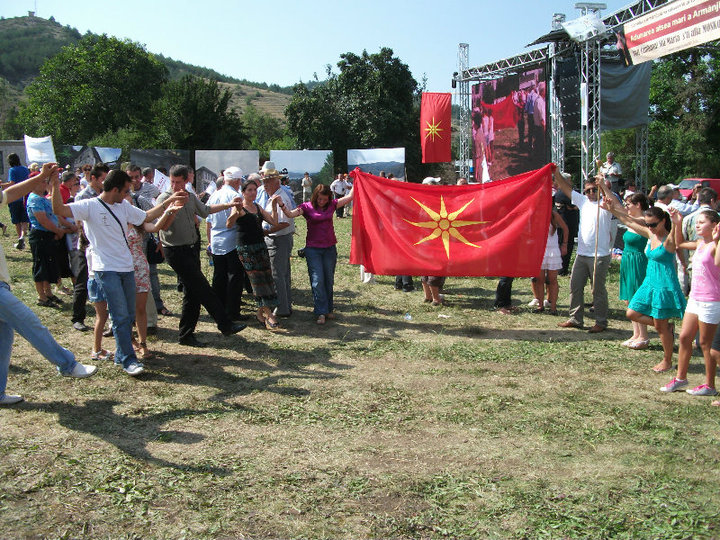
Aromanian festival in Moscopole

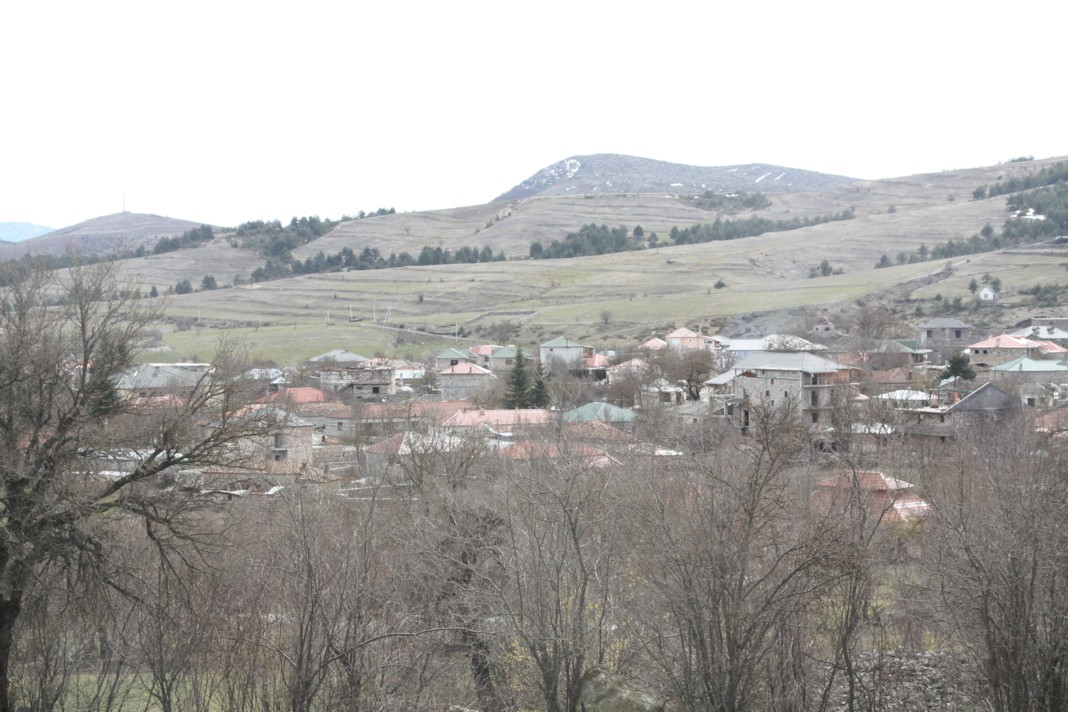
View of the village

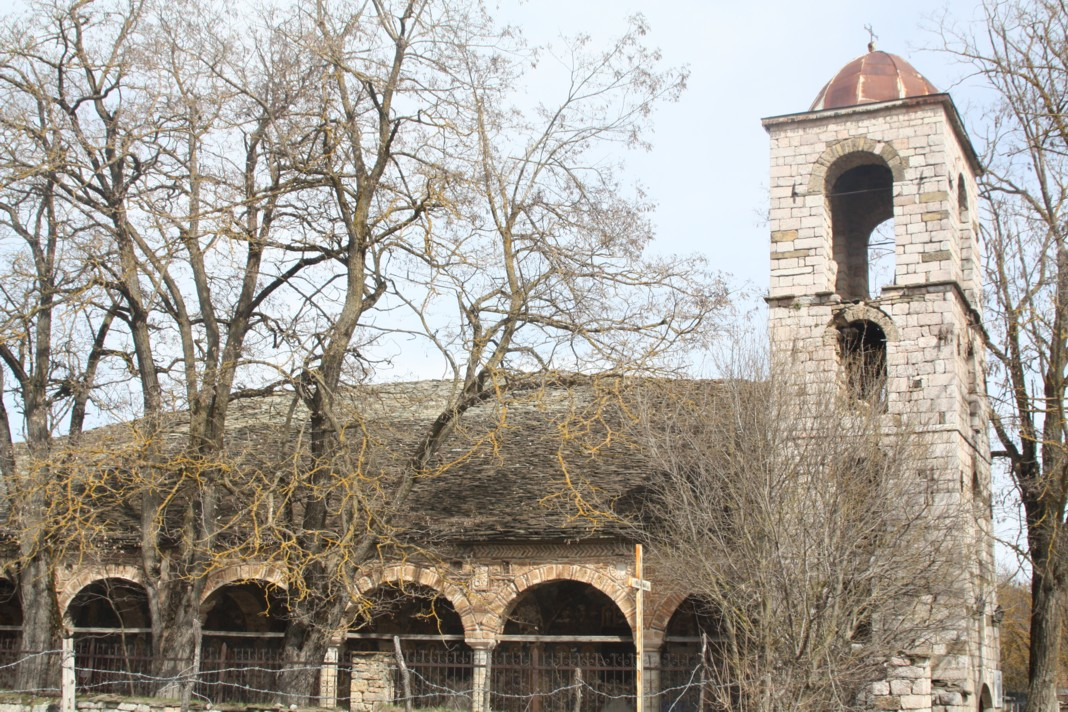
Saint Nicholas Church

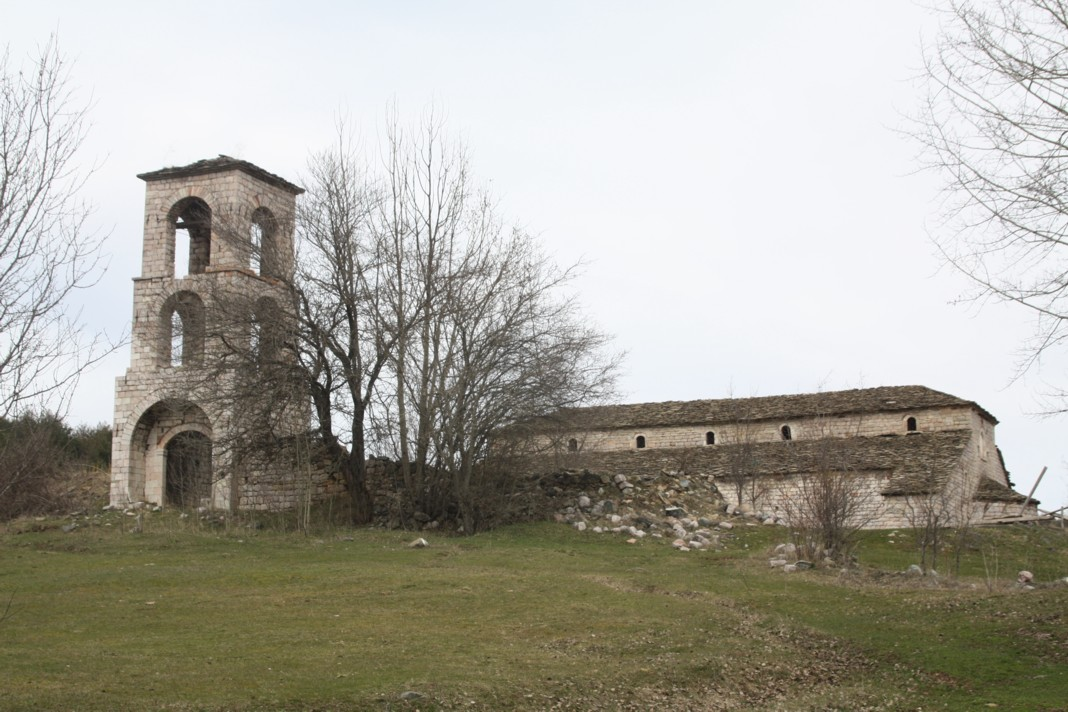
Saint Nicholas Church

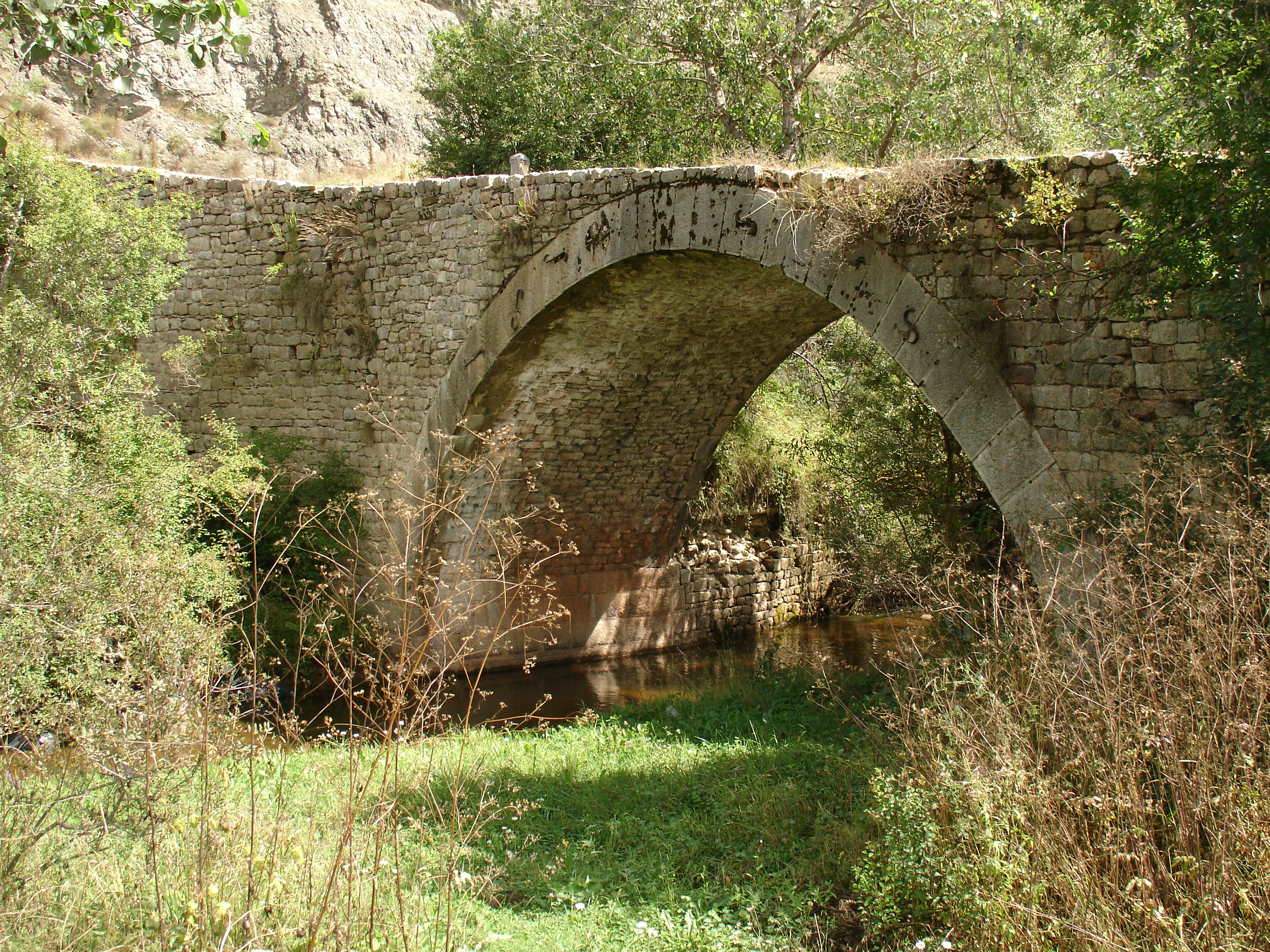
The St. John the Baptist Bridge, next to the village

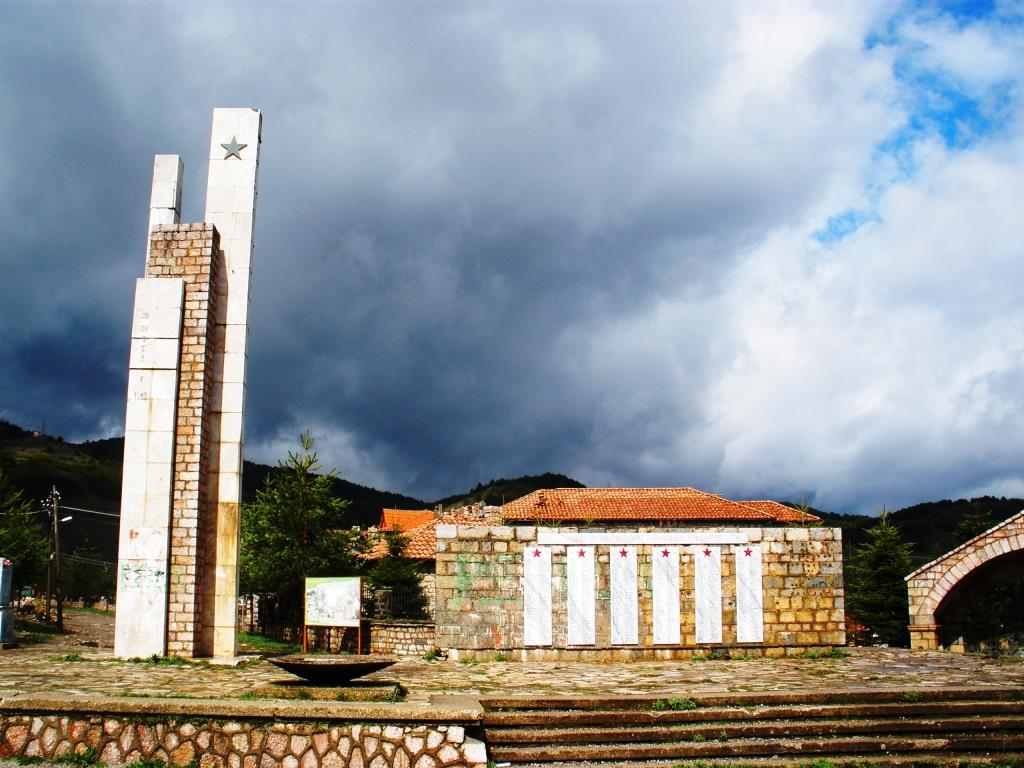
The lapidar of Moscopole

== See also ==
- Aromanians in Albania
- Tourism in Albania

== Bibliography ==
- Asterios Koukoudis Studies on the Vlachs (in Greek and English)
- Românii din Albania – Aromânii(in Romanian)
- Giakoumis, Konstantinos (2016). "From Religios to Secular and Back Again: Christian Pilgrimage Space in Albania". In John Eade, Mario Katić (ed.). Pilgrimage, Politics and Place-Making in Eastern Europe: Crossing the Borders. Routledge Studies in Pilgrimage, Religious Travel and Tourism. Routledge. pp. 103–118. ISBN 9781317080831.
- Steliu Lambru, Narrating National Utopia – The Case Moschopolis in the Aromanian National Discourse (in English)
- Peyfuss, Max Demeter (1989). Die Druckerei von Moschopolis, 1731–1769: Buchdruck und Heiligenverehrung im Erzbistum Achrida (in German). Vienna: Böhlau. ISBN 3-205-98571-0.
- Nicolas Trifon, Des Aroumains aux Tsintsares - Destinées Historiques Et Littéraires D’un Peuple Méconnu (in French)
- Ewa Kocój, The Story of an Invisible City. The Cultural Heritage of Moscopole in Albania. Urban Regeneration, Cultural Memory and Space Management [in:] Intangible heritage of the city. Musealisation, preservation, education, ed. By M. Kwiecińska, Kraków 2016, s. 267–280
