= Daniel Moscopolites =

Aromanian scholar

The Lexicon Tetraglosson dictionary of four Balkan languages (Greek, Aromanian, Bulgarian and Albanian) written by Daniel Moscopolites

Daniel of Moscopole or Daniil of Moscopole (1754–1825; Aromanian: Daniil Moscopoleanu or Moscopoleanlu; Greek: Δανιήλ Μοσχοπολίτης, romanized: Daniil Moschopolitis), also known as Mihali Adami Hagi (Aromanian: Mihali Adami Hagi), was an Aromanian scholar from Moscopole and student of Theodoros Kavalliotis, an 18th/19th-century professor and director of New Academy of Moscopole.

== Works ==
Daniel was an Aromanian, and has been described as Hellenized. In this period, Moscopole was an important Balkan city, the cultural and commercial center of the Aromanians and the site of the first printing press working in the Balkans.

Daniel, in his work, Εισαγωγική Διδασκαλία ("Introductory Instruction"), compiled a combined dictionary of Greek (Romaika), Aromanian (Vlachika), Bulgarian (Vulgarika) and Albanian (Alvanitika). Daniel invited non-Greek speakers with this dictionary to learn the Greek language:

Albanians, Vlachs, Bulgarians, speaker of other languages, rejoice, and prepare yourselves all of you to become Greeks (Romioi), leaving the barbarian language, voice and customs, that to your descendants will appear like myths.

Despite promoting the Greek language, Aromanian was Daniel's mother tongue. Furthermore, according to the Bulgarian scholar Aleksandăr Ničev, he did not know Greek very well.

In 1794, he published in Venice a dictionary of four modern Balkan languages (Greek, Albanian, Aromanian and Bulgarian). Many authors published his works in Greek and in Aromanian in the Greek alphabet. With his lexicographic work, Daniel hoped to persuade the Albanians, Aromanians and Bulgarians to abandon their "barbaric" tongues and learn Greek, the "mother of knowledge". The book was republished in 1802 in Dubrovnik or Venice.
