= List of churches in Albania =

This is a list of the main churches and monasteries in Albania.

== Churches ==
765 churches and monasteries were destroyed by communist authorities in 1967 when state atheism was first introduced in the country.

Churches
#	Name	Location	Built	Denomination	Image
1	St. Jovan Vladimir's Church	Shijon	11th, rebuilt in 14th century	Eastern Orthodox	
2	Church of Marmiroi	Orikum	12th century	Eastern Orthodox	
3	St. Paraskevi's Church	Çetë	13th century	Roman Catholic, since 1691 Eastern Orthodox	
4	Church of the Holy Trinity	Berat	13th century	Eastern Orthodox	
5	Church of the Dormition of the Theotokos	Libohovë	6th century, rebuilt in 10th or 13th century	Eastern Orthodox	
6	Holy Resurrection Church	Mborje	896 or 13–14th century	Eastern Orthodox	
7	Sacred Heart Church	Tirana	1939	Roman Catholic	
8	St. Nicholas Church	Perondi	11th century	Eastern Orthodox	
9	St. Athanasius Church	Moscopole	1721	Eastern Orthodox	
10	St. Elijah Church	Moscopole		Eastern Orthodox	
11	St. Mary's Church	Moscopole	1694–1699	Eastern Orthodox	
12	St. Michael Church	Moscopole	1722	Eastern Orthodox	
13	St. Nicholas Church	Moscopole	1721	Eastern Orthodox	
14	St. Anthony Church	Laç	1300, rebuilt in 1990	Roman Catholic	
15	St. Sotir Church	Korçë	Early 20th century, rebuilt in 1995–2005	Eastern Orthodox	
16	St. Cosmas' and St. Mary's Church	Kolkondas	1813	Eastern Orthodox	
17	St. Mary of Blachernae Church	Berat Castle	13th century	Eastern Orthodox	
18	Resurrection Cathedral	Tirana	2012	Eastern Orthodox	
19	Resurrection Cathedral, Korçë	Korçë County	2002	Eastern Orthodox	
20	Church of St. Michael	Berat	14th century	Eastern Orthodox	
21	St. Paul's Cathedral	Tirana	2001	Roman Catholic	

== Monasteries ==
Monasteries
#	Name	Location	Built	Denomination	Image
1	Ardenica Monastery	Lushnjë	1282	Eastern Orthodox	
2	St. Mary's Monastery	Zvërnec	13th or 14th century	Eastern Orthodox	
3	Rubik Monastery	Rubik	1166	Roman Catholic	
4	St. John the Baptist Monastery	Moscopole	1632	Eastern Orthodox	
5	Forty Saints Monastery	Sarandë	6th century	Eastern Orthodox	
6	Dhuvjan Monastery	Dhuvjan	1089	Eastern Orthodox	

== See also ==
- List of cathedrals in Albania
- List of Roman Catholic dioceses in Albania
