= Holy Trinity Church (Berat) =

14th-century church in Albania

Holy Trinity Church Albanian: Kisha e Shën Triadhës
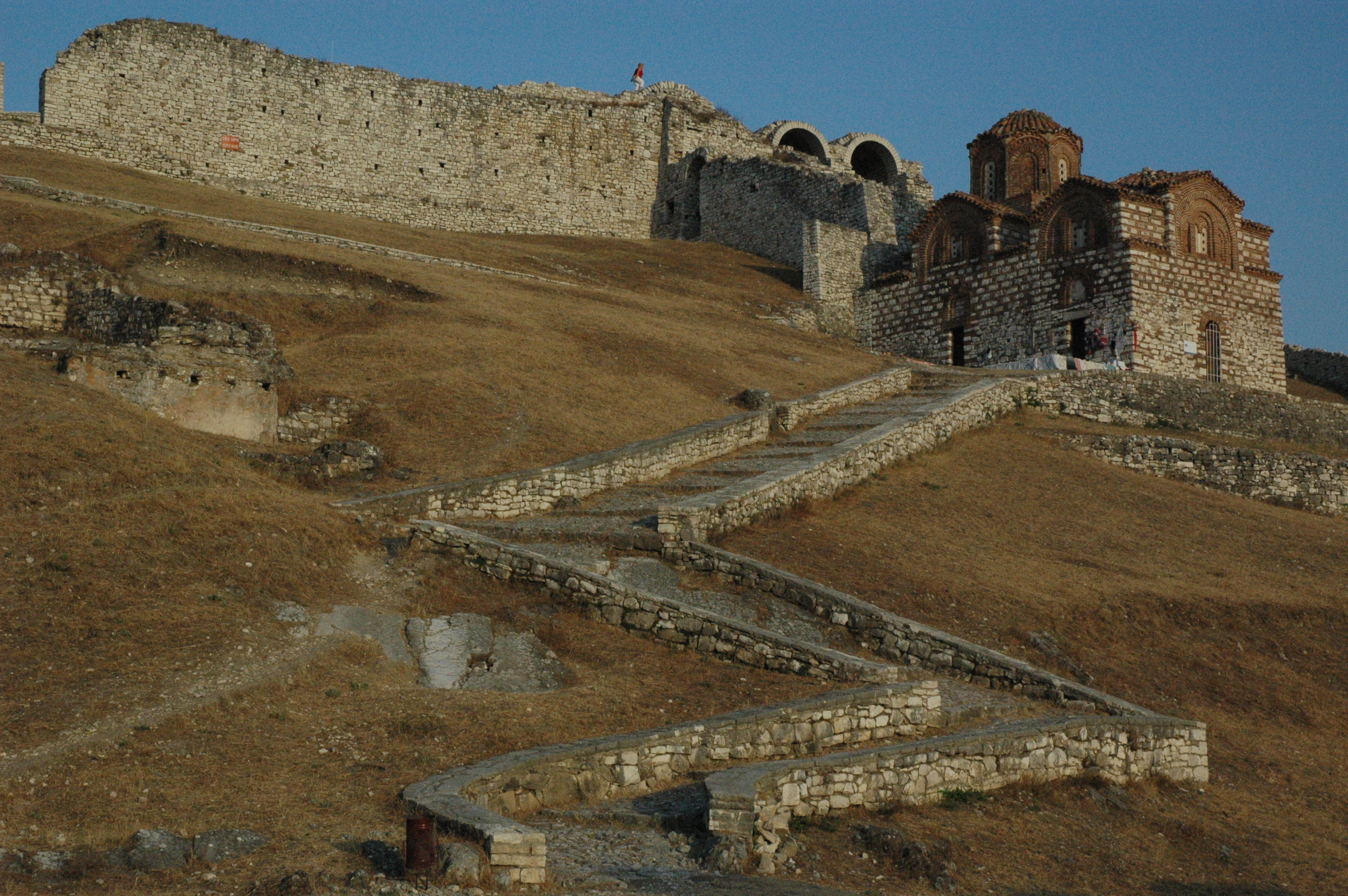
- Holy Trinity Church of Berat
- Interactive map of Holy Trinity Church; Albanian: Kisha e Shën Triadhës
- 40°42′17″N 19°56′48″E
- Location: Berat, Berat County; Albania

History
- Built: thirteenth or fourteenth century

Cultural Monument of Albania
- Designated: 1948
- Reference no.: X0074

The Holy Trinity Church (Albanian: Kisha e Shën Triadhës) is a medieval Byzantine-era Albanian Orthodox church which stands on a hill in the city of Berat in the Kalaja district of Southern Albania.

One of the Historic Centres of Berat and Gjirokastër UNESCO World Heritage Site, the church has a cross shaped plan with a dome. It is composed of the nave, narthex (entrance area) and the altar alcove. In the church many Byzantine architecture features have been skilfully used such as the inner organization of the space and the decorative and illuminative systems. These features, together with the pyramidal shape, forms and proportions give the church a picturesque appearance. The Byzantine architectural elements in the church have been combined with western architectural elements belonging to the same period.

Inside the church are two columns with reused capitals (thought to have been taken from classical ruins in the city). An inscription inside the church contains the name of Andronikos Angelos Palaiologos (Governor of the province of Berat from 1302 to 1326), indicating that the church must have been built during the 13th or 14th century with his financial support.

== Gallery ==
Images of the Church
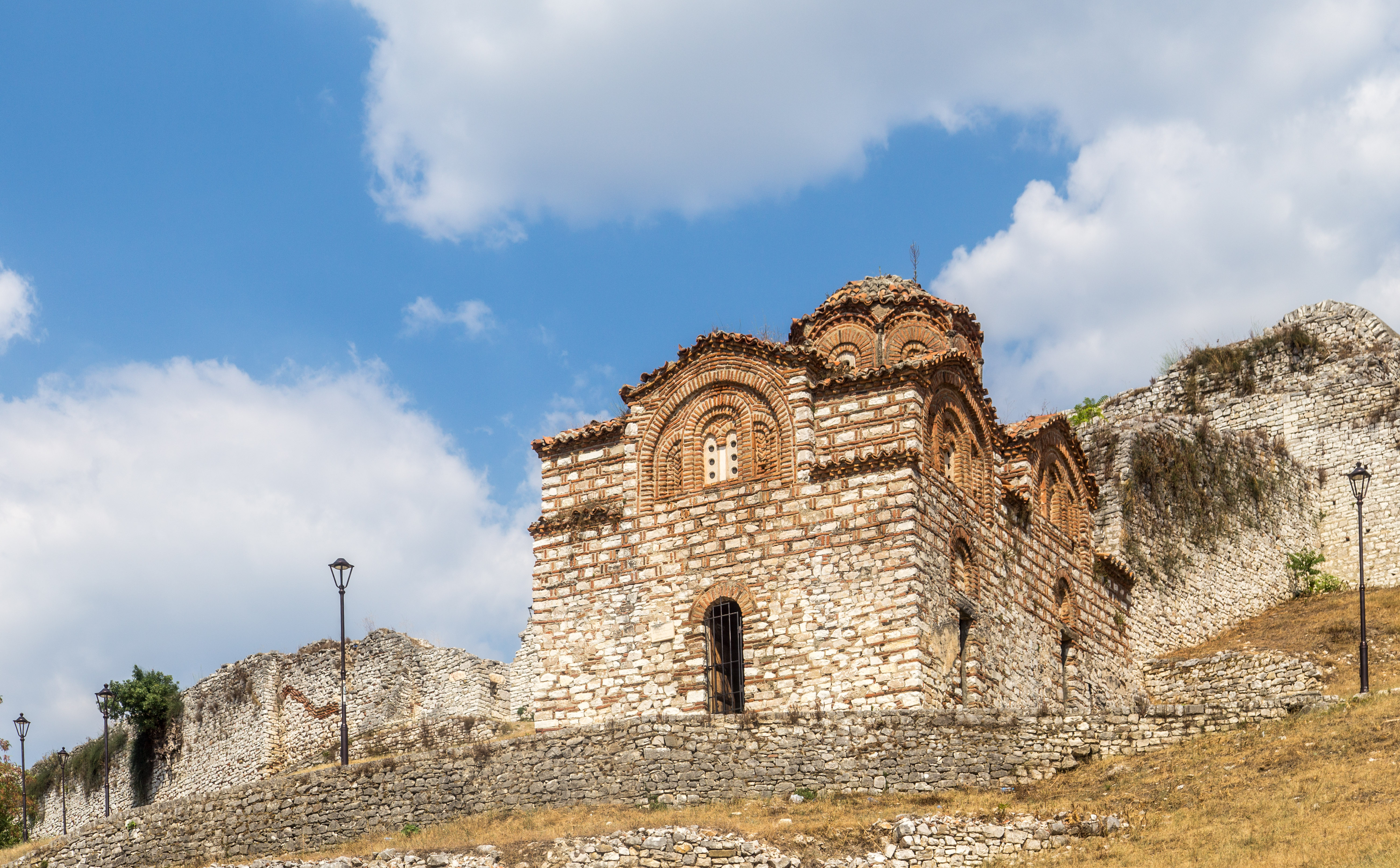
Southeast Exterior view of the church.

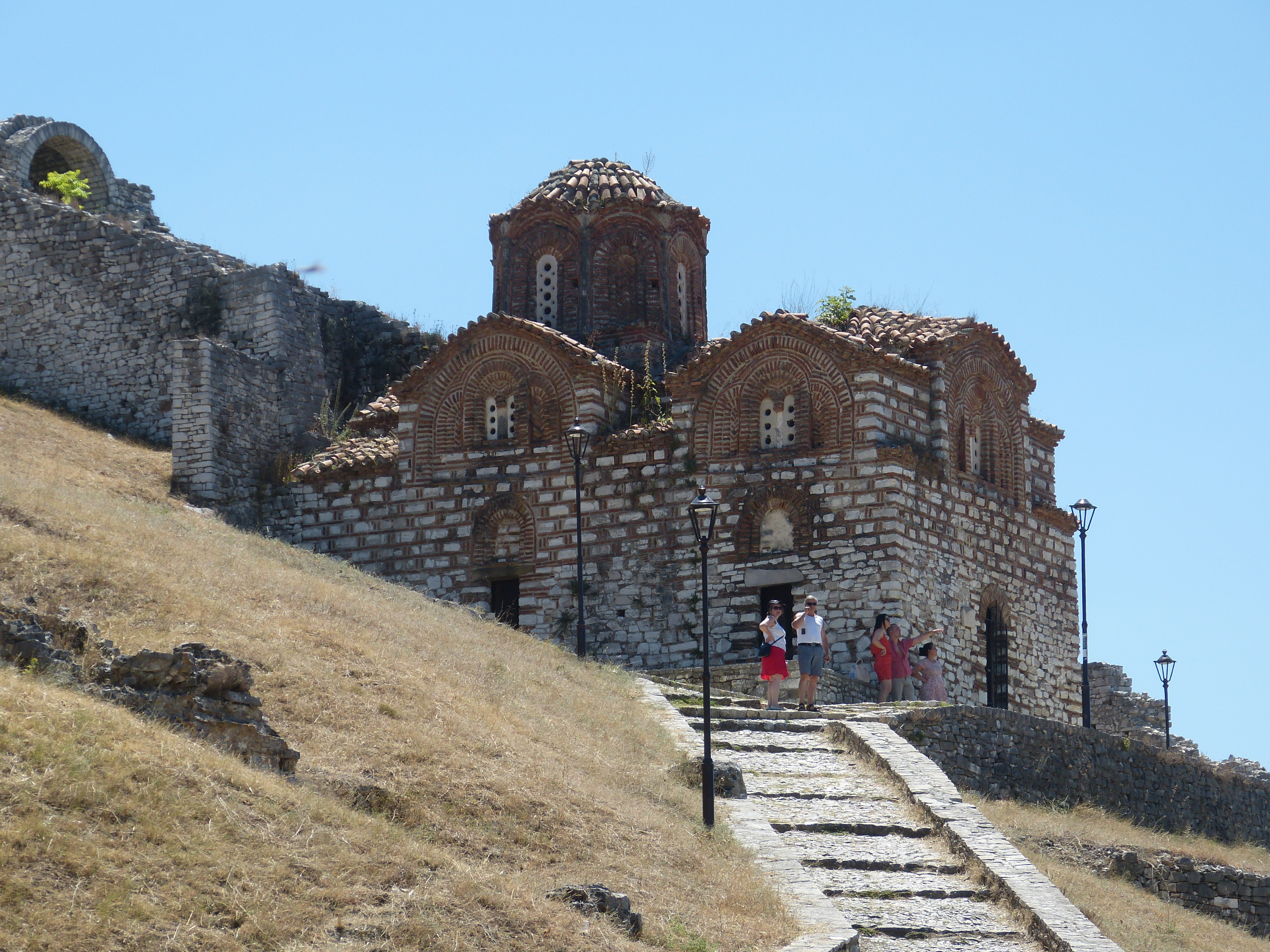
Southwest Exterior view of the church.

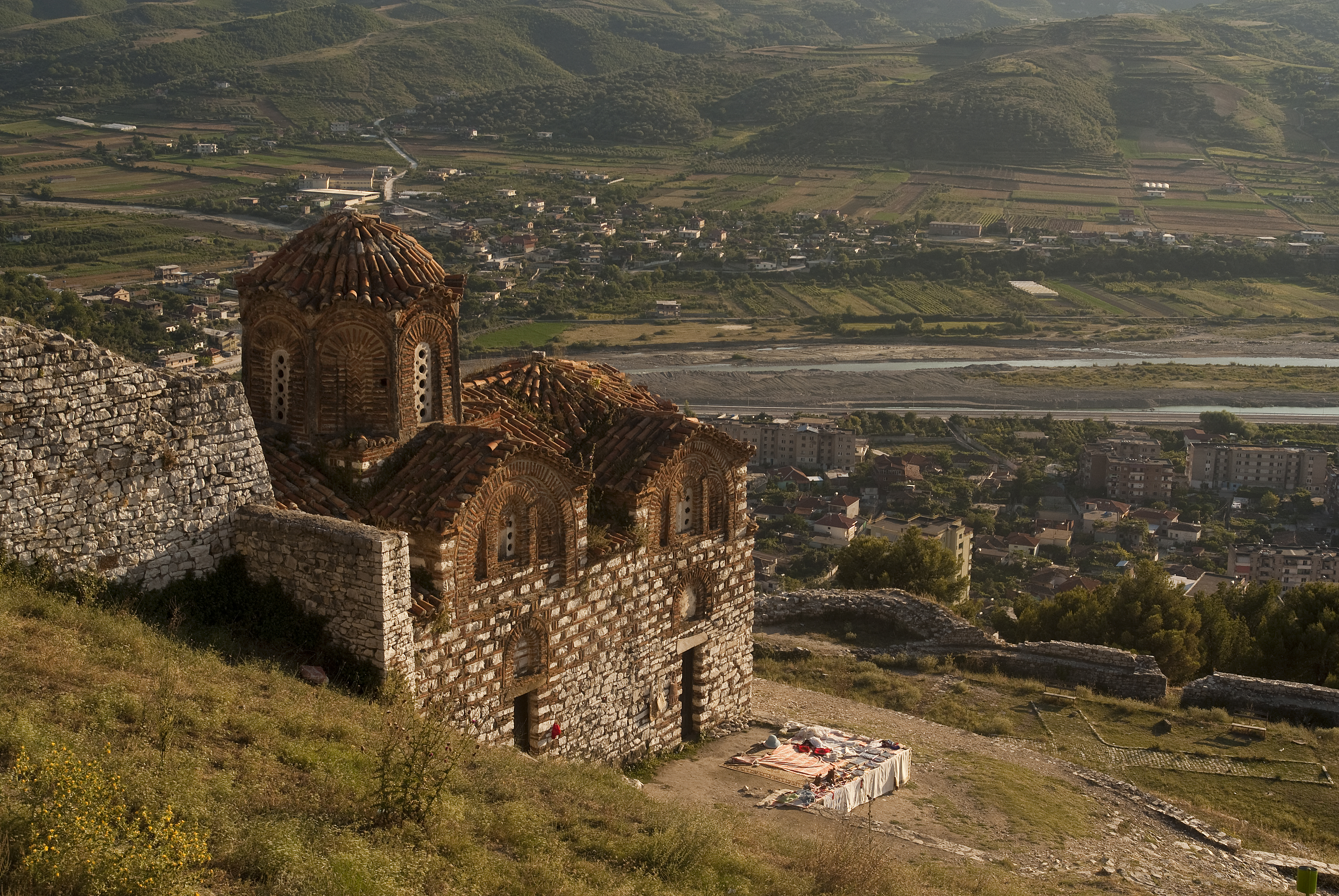
Northwest Exterior View of the church.

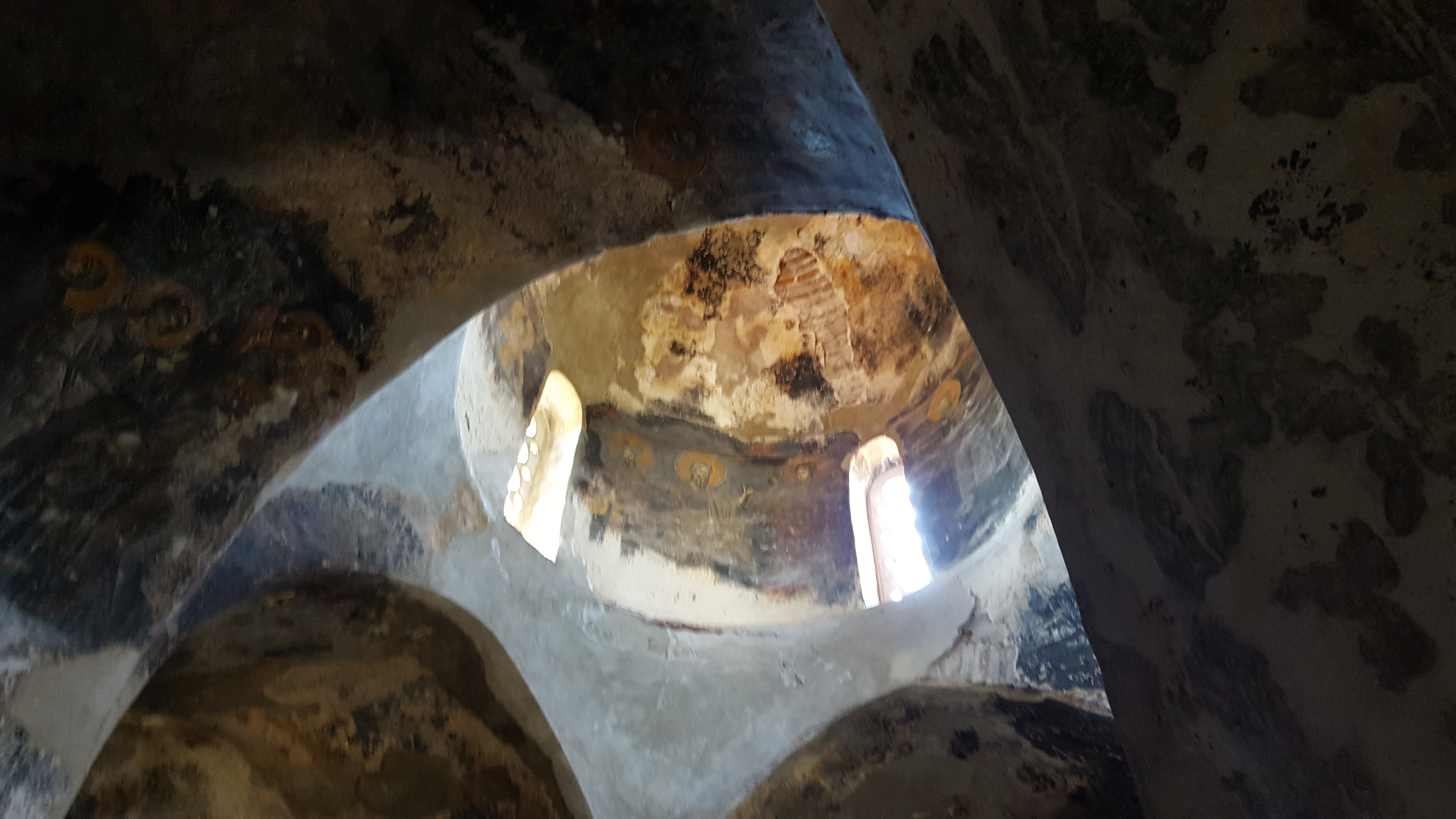
Interior view of the church.

== See also ==
- Tourist attractions in Berat
- Culture of Albania
- Architecture of Albania
- Byzantine churches in Albania
