= Tourist attractions in Berat =

Tourist attraction in Albania

The article refers to the tourist attractions in Berat. The city of Berat is a city in the south of the Republic of Albania and the capital of the surrounding Berat County. It offers a variety of tourist attractions, including historical sights, monuments, museums, theatres, churches, monasteries, mosques and places.

Berat was designated a UNESCO World Heritage Site in 2008 comprising a unique style of architecture with influences from several civilizations that have managed to coexist for centuries throughout the history. Like many cities in Albania, the city includes an old fortified city filled with churches and mosques painted with grandiose wealth of visible murals and frescos.

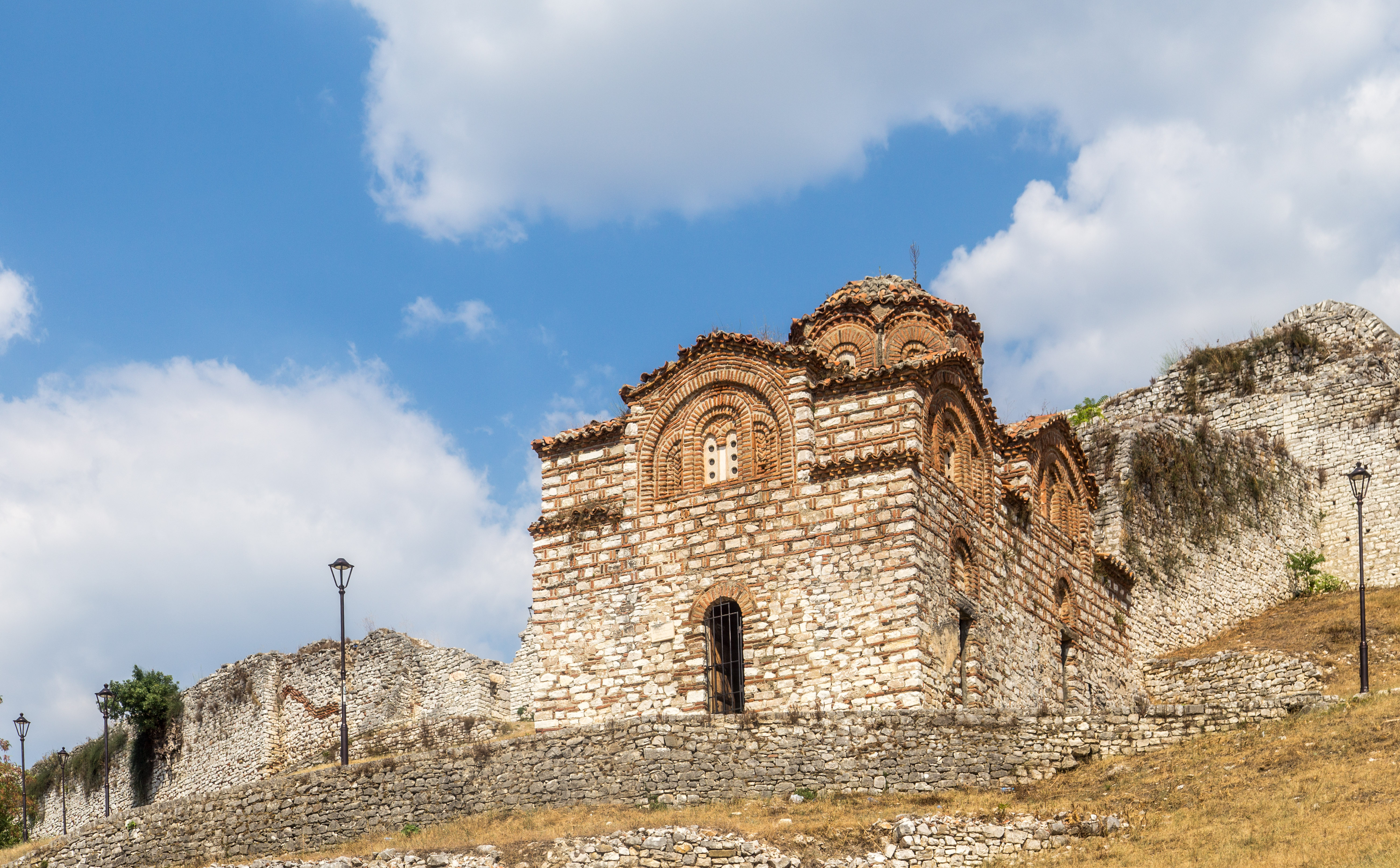
Holy Trinity Church

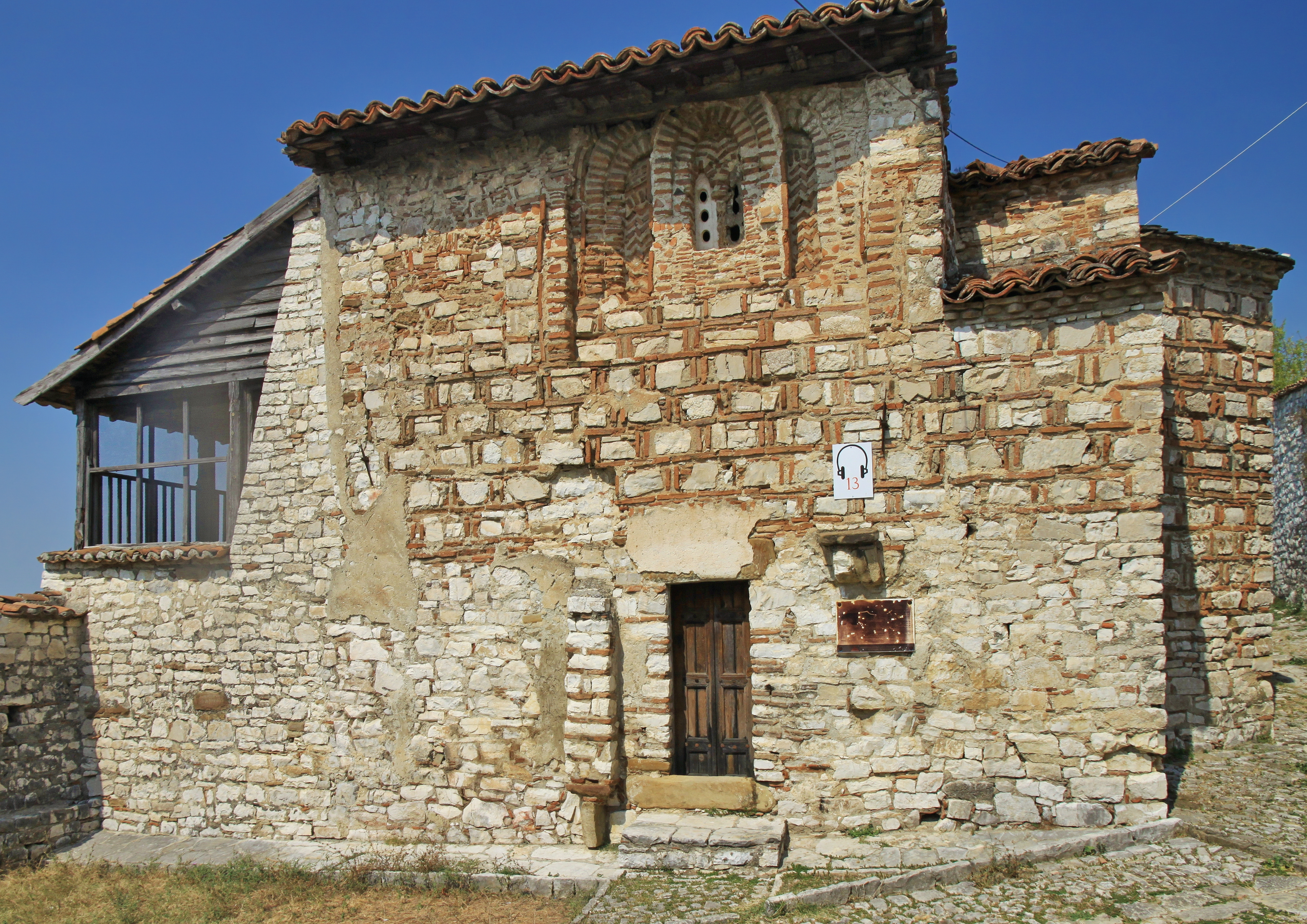
St. Mary of Blachernae Church

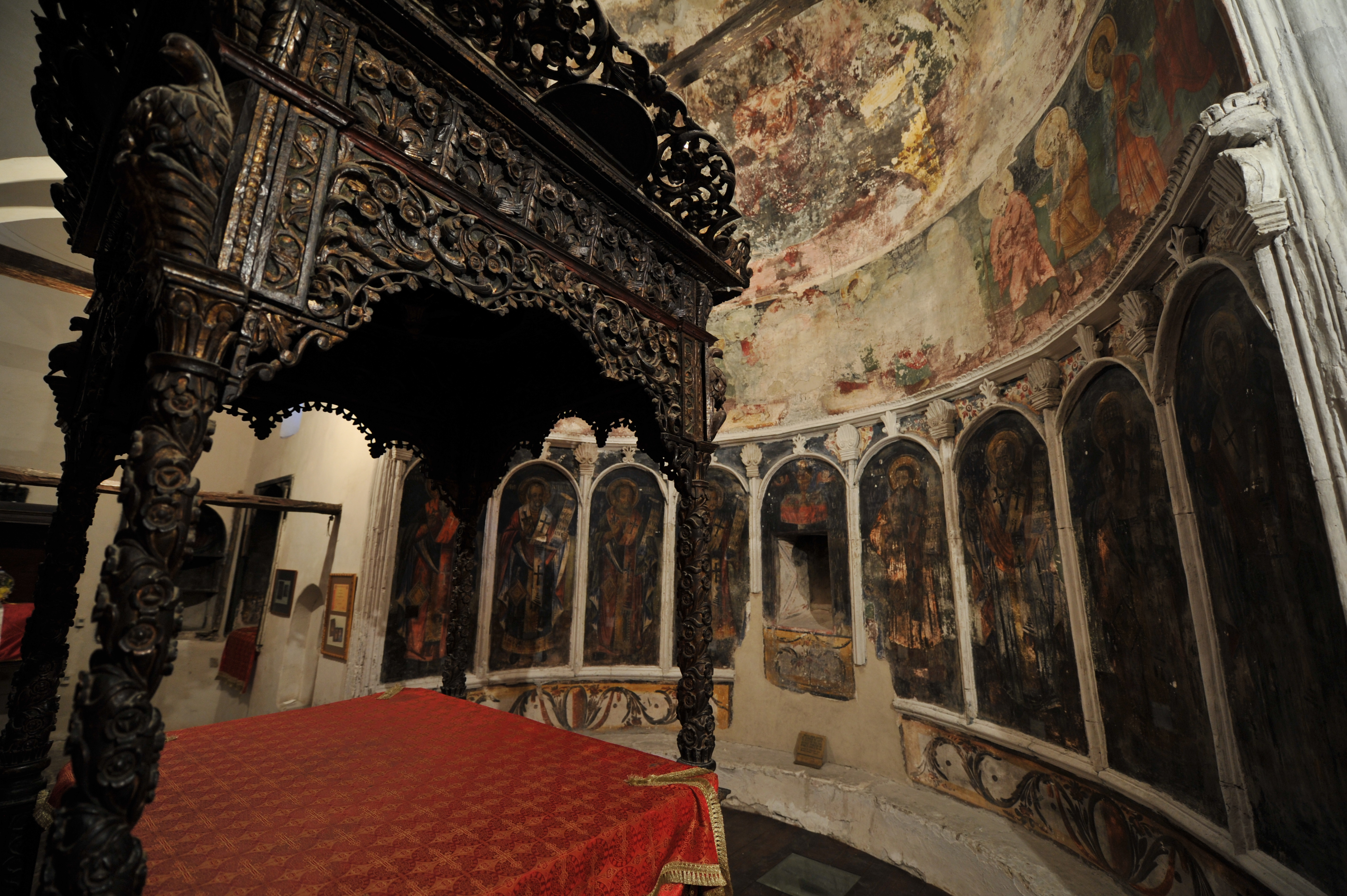
St. Theodore's Church

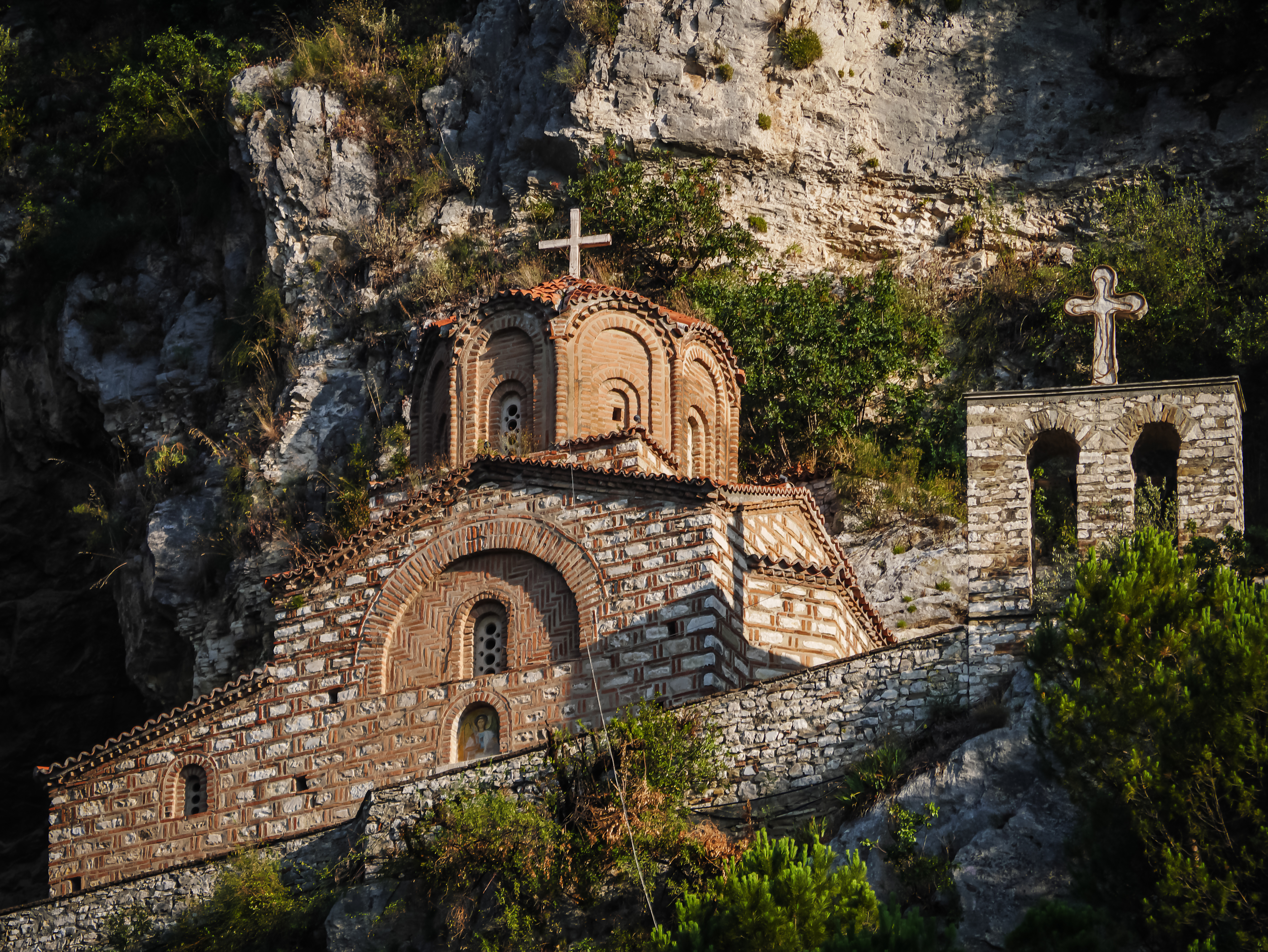
St. Michael's Church

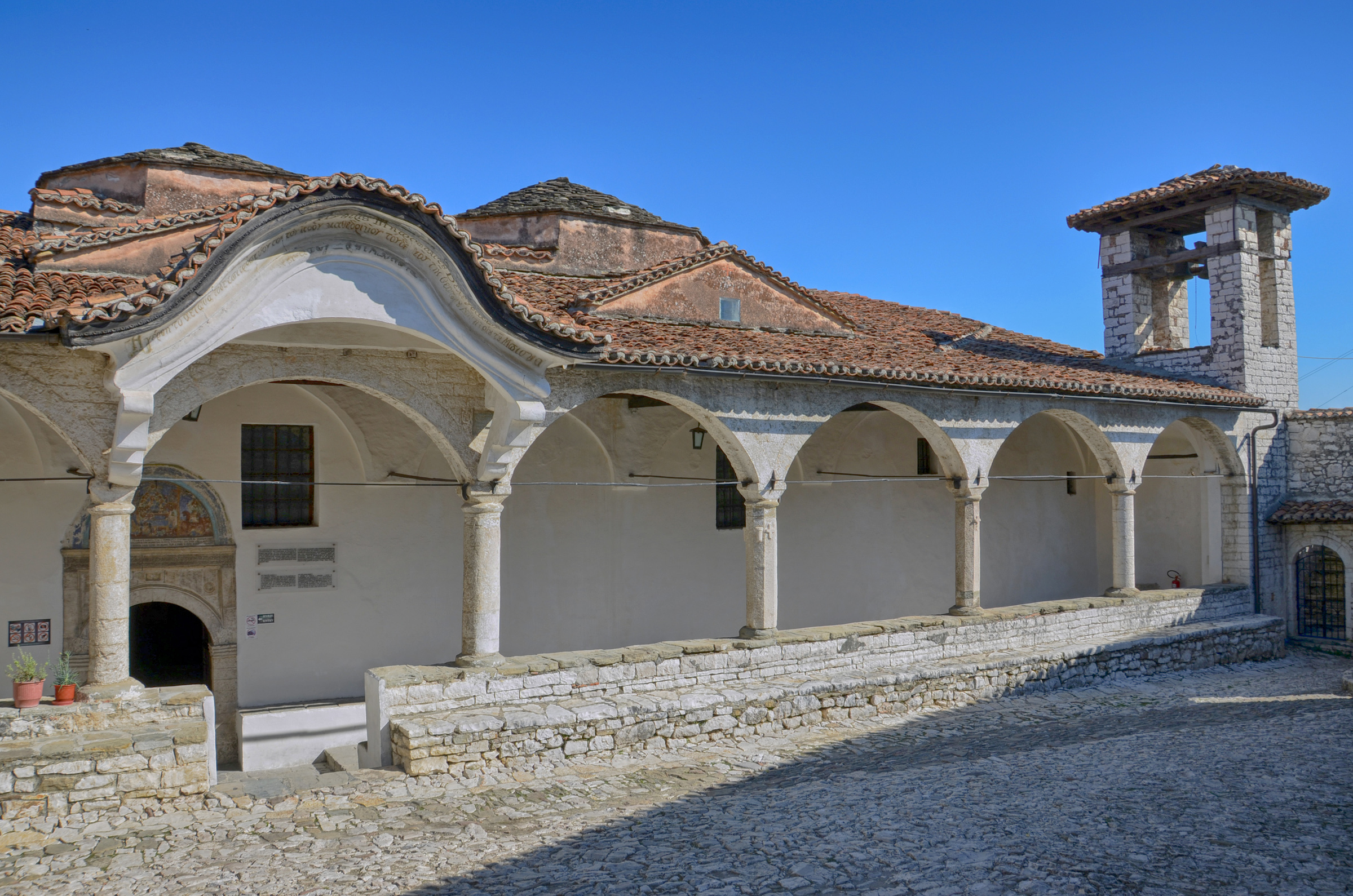
Dormition of St. Mary Cathedral

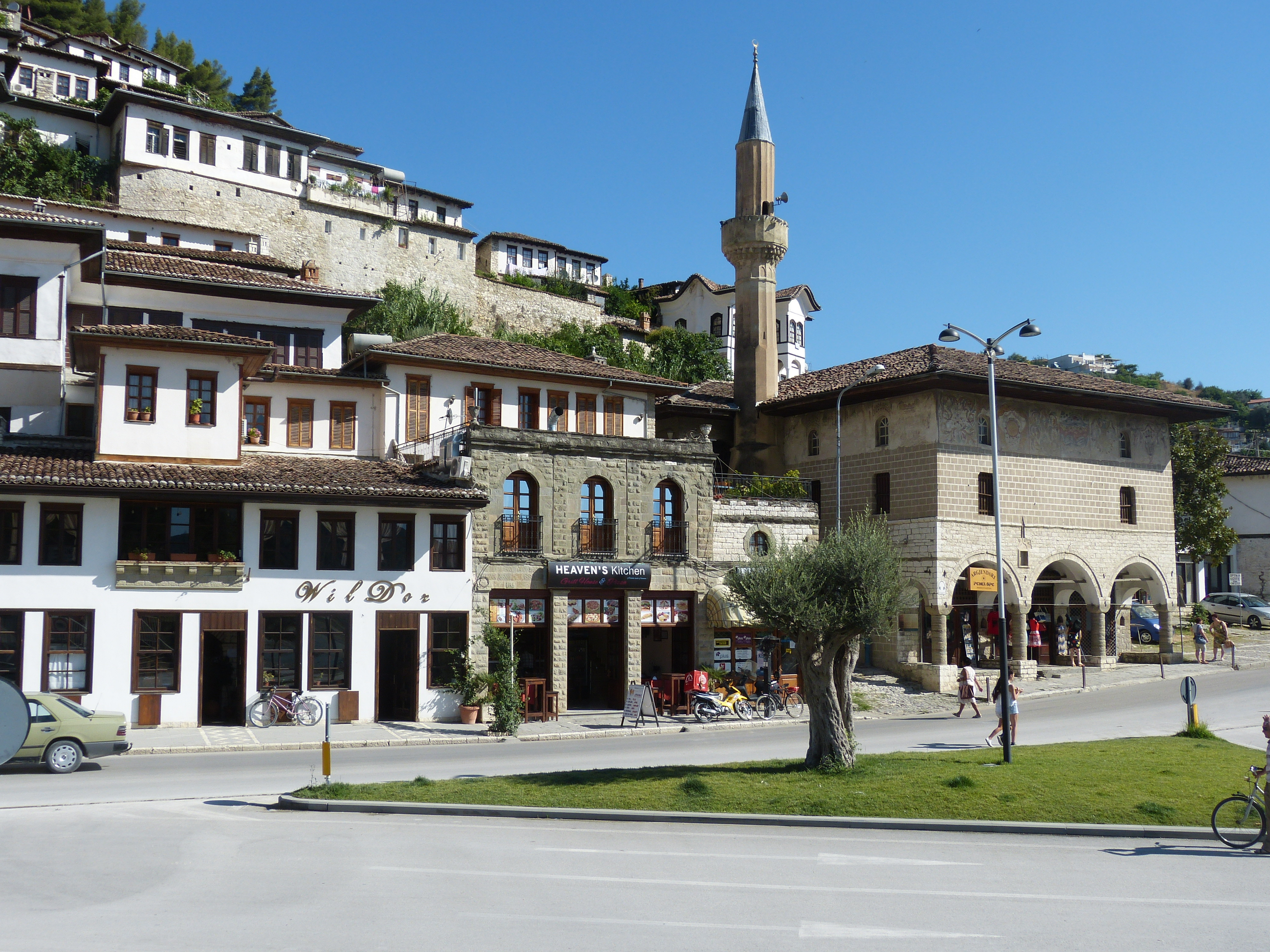
Bachelor's Mosque

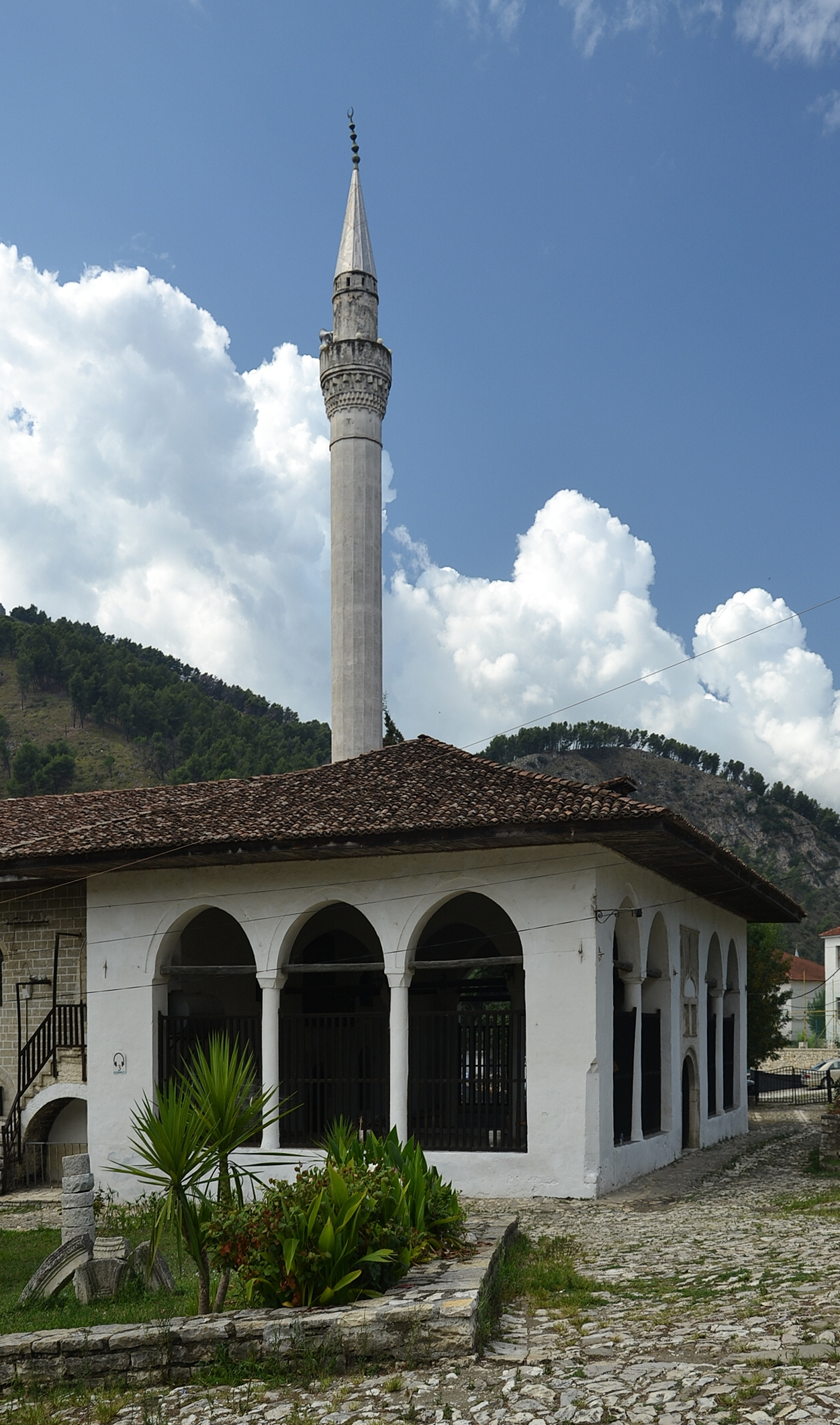
King Mosque

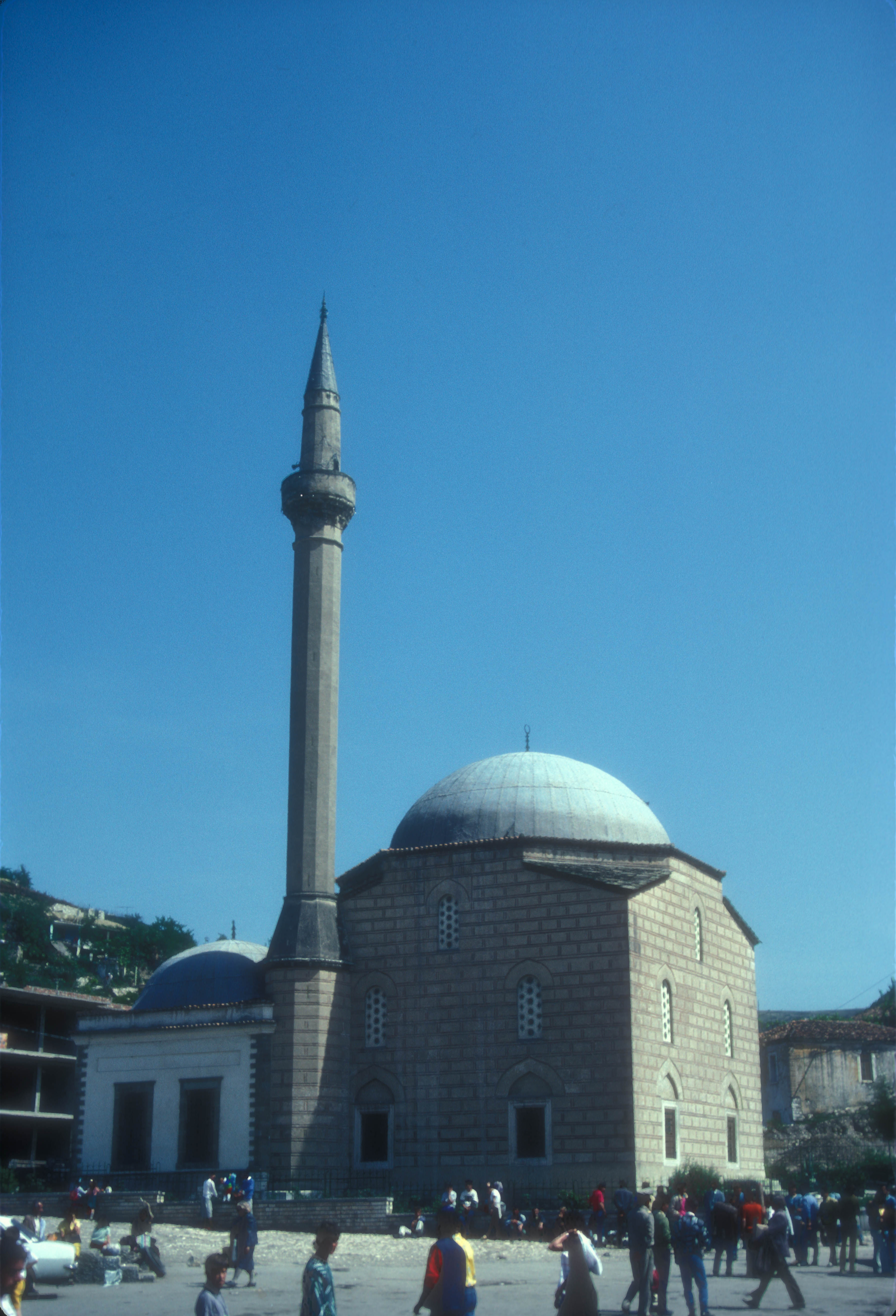
Lead Mosque

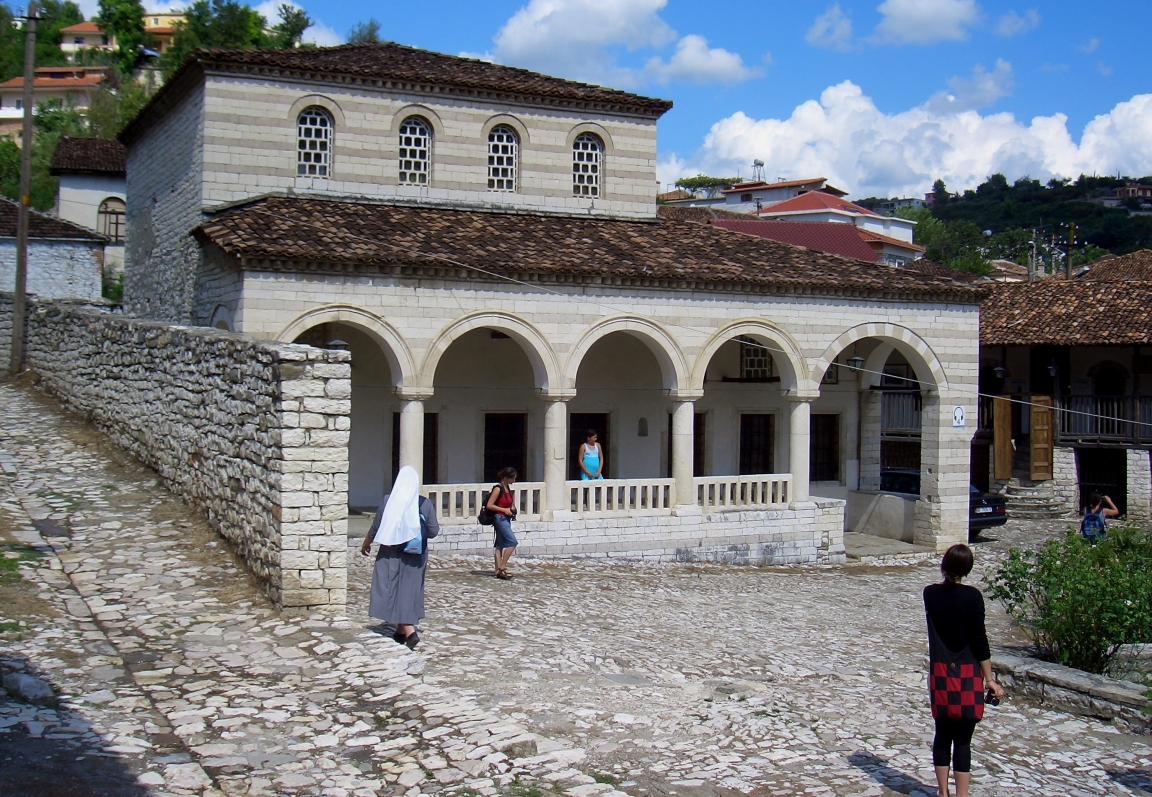
Halveti Teqe

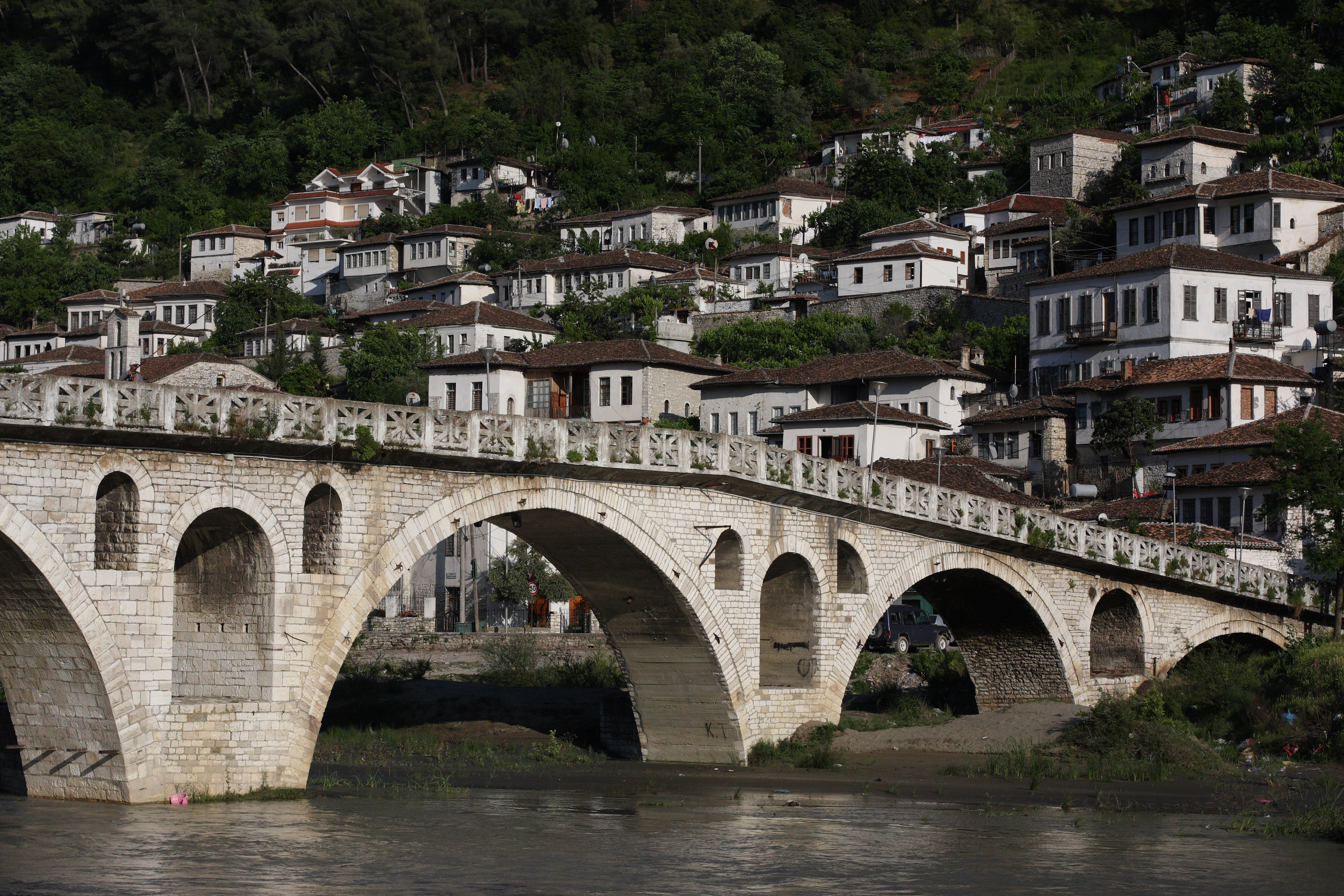
Gorica Bridge

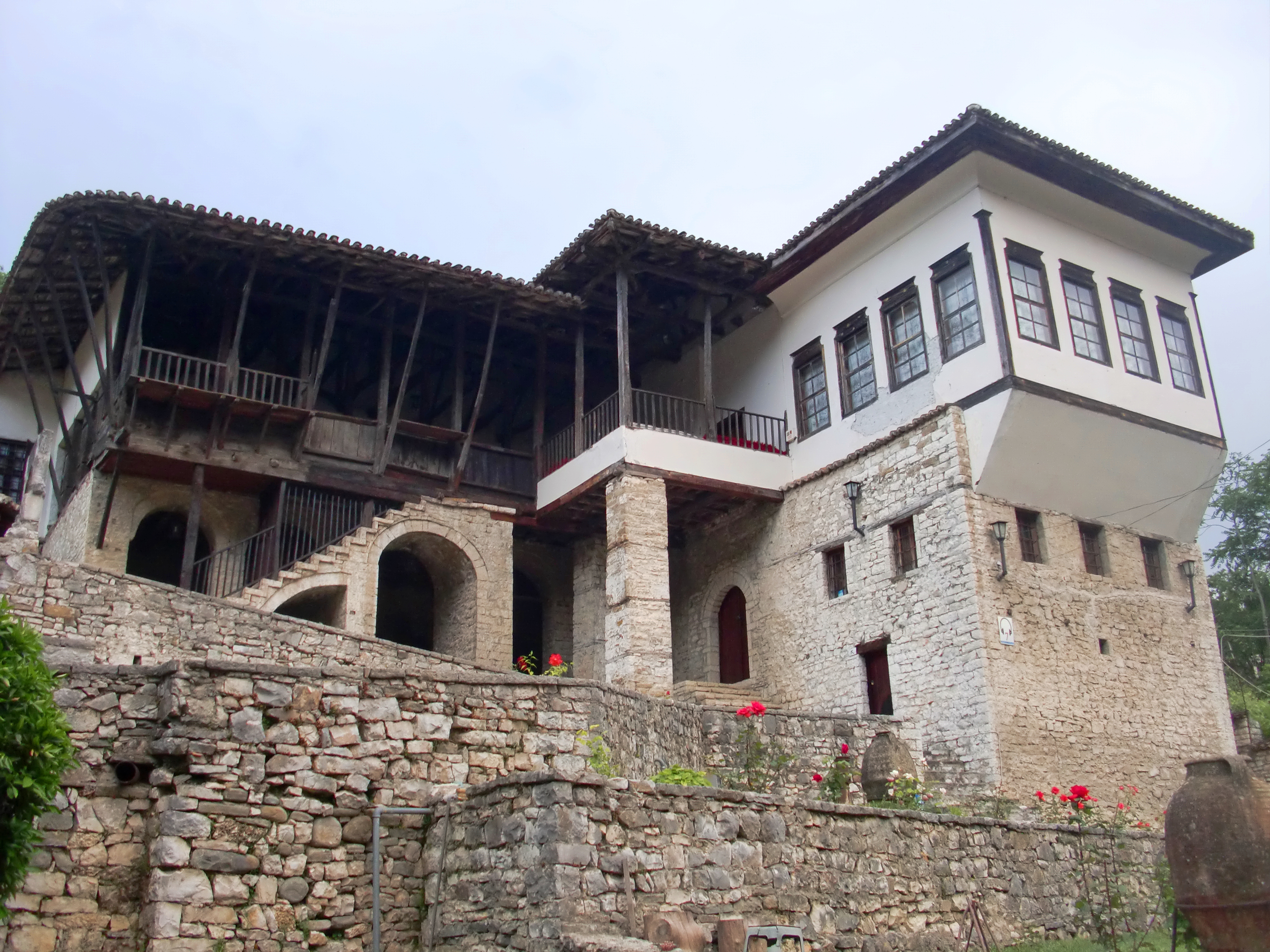
National Ethnographic Museum

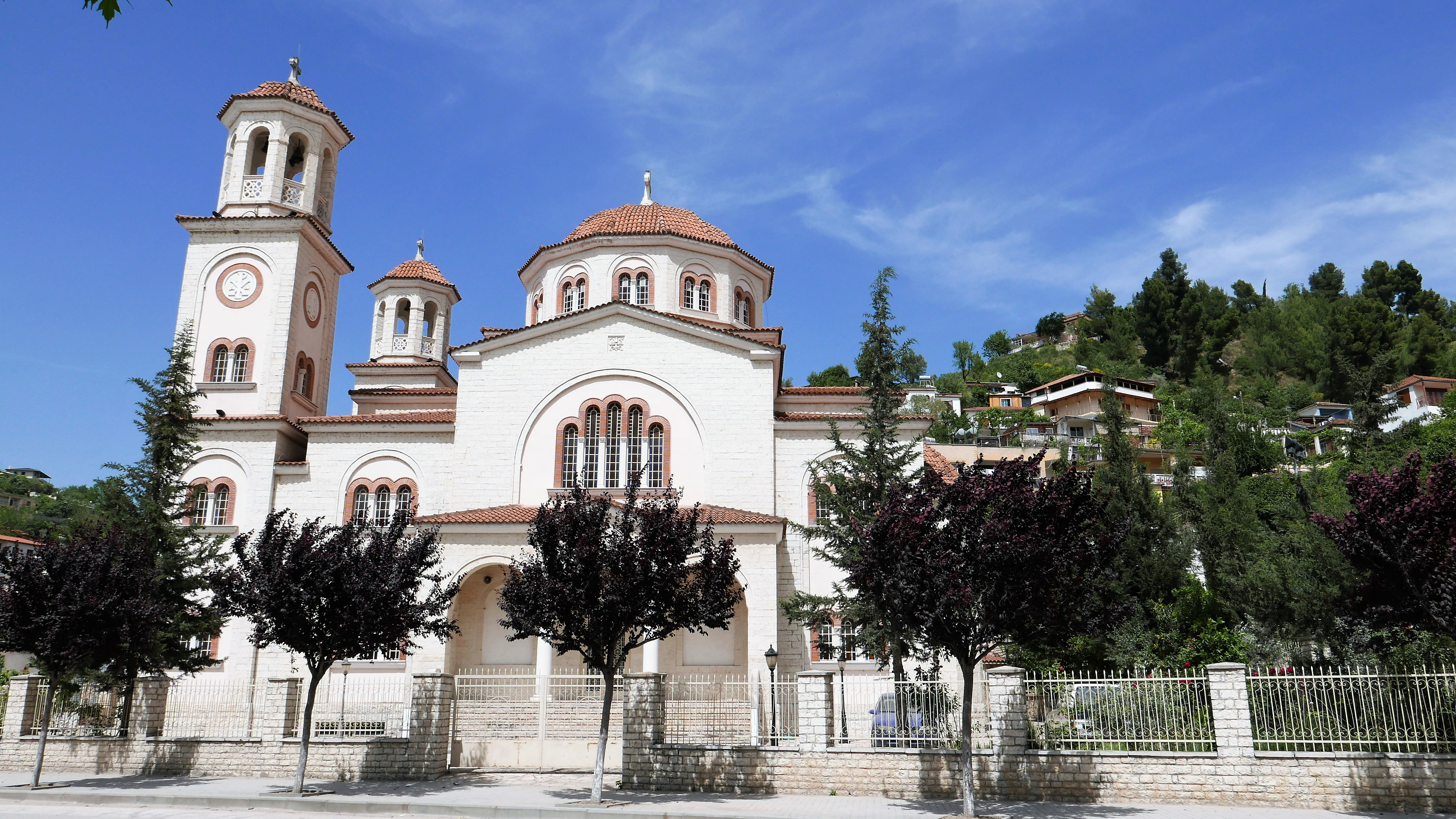
Saint Demetrius Cathedral

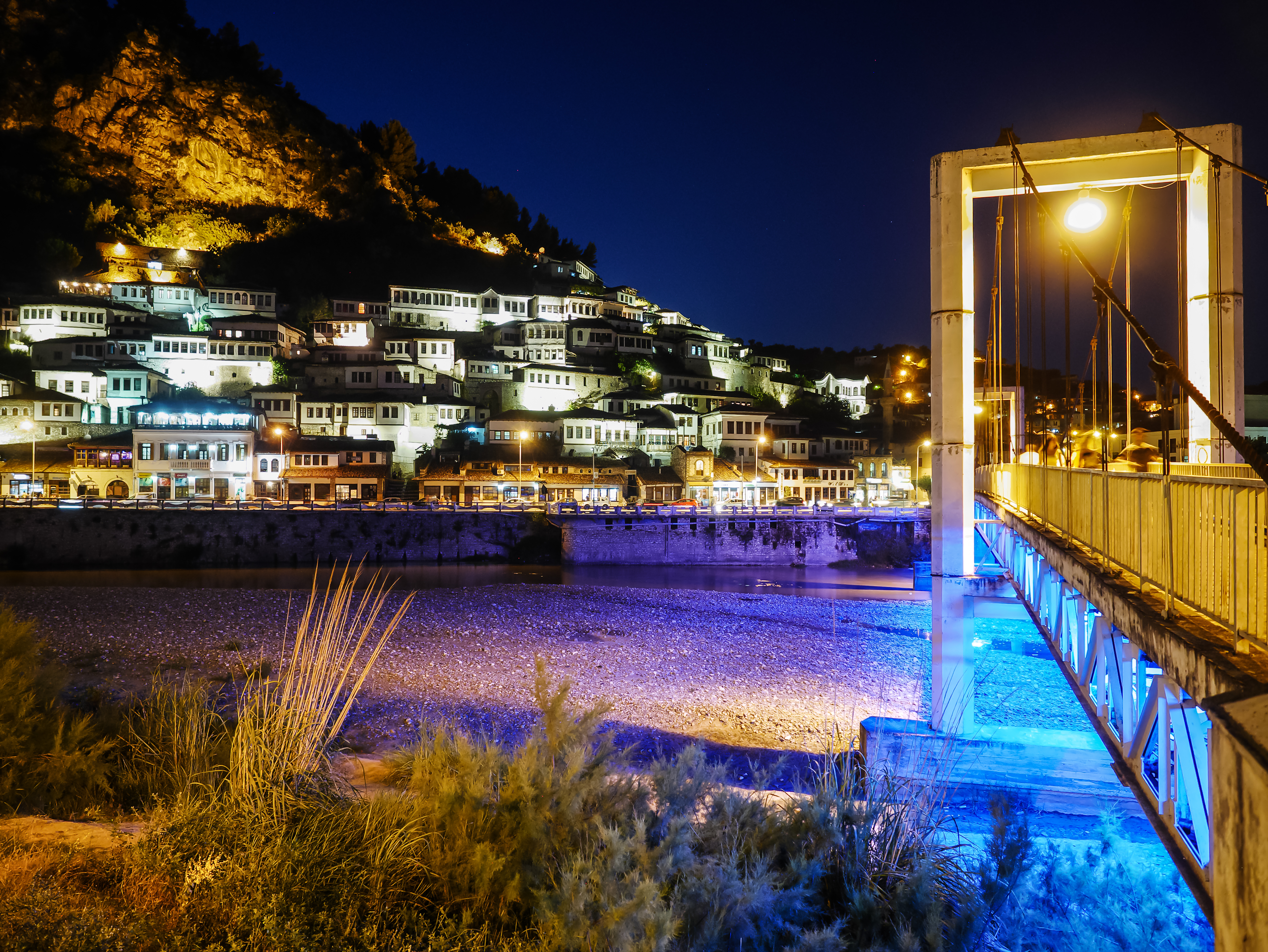
Mangalem district

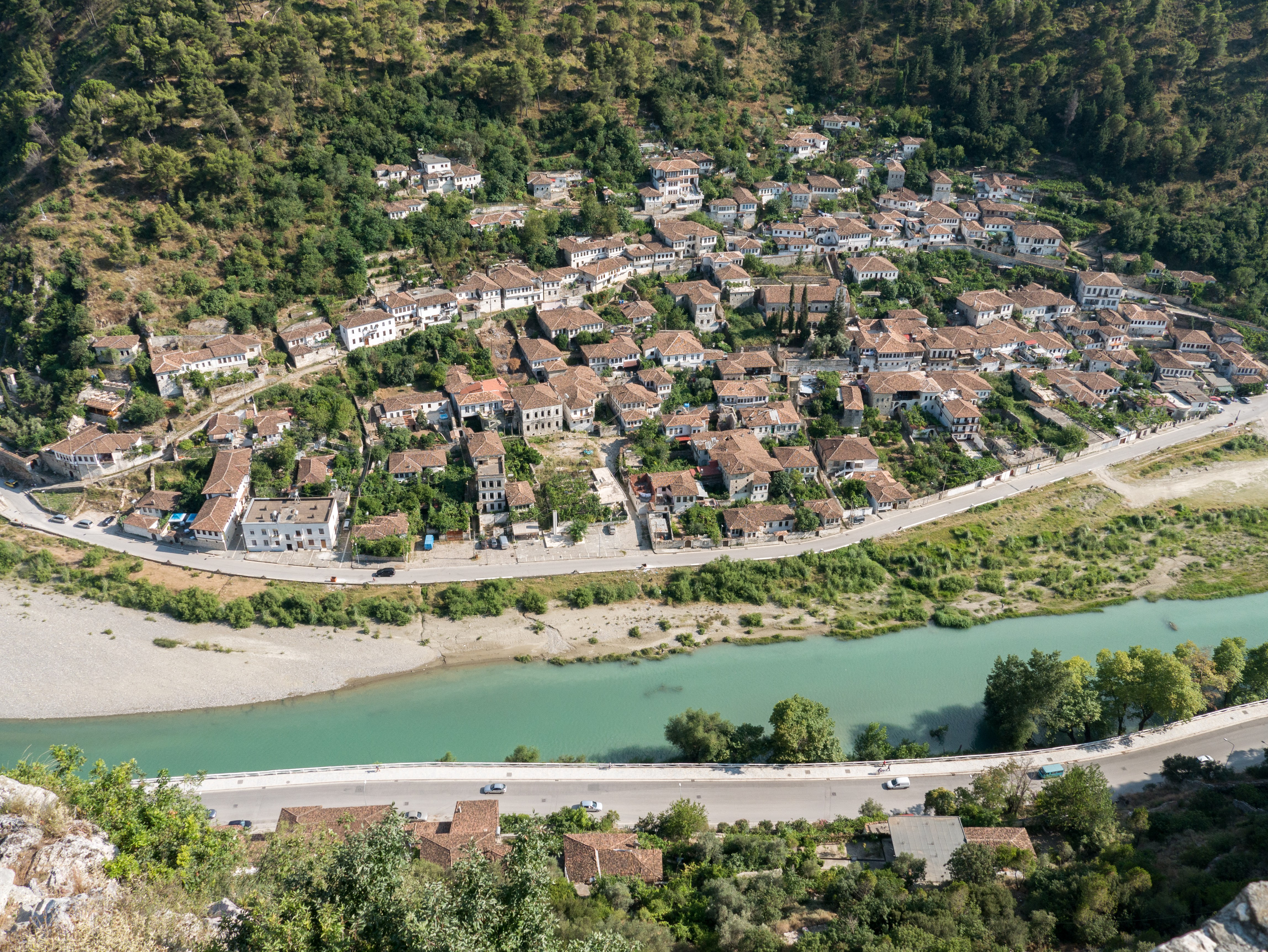
Gorica district

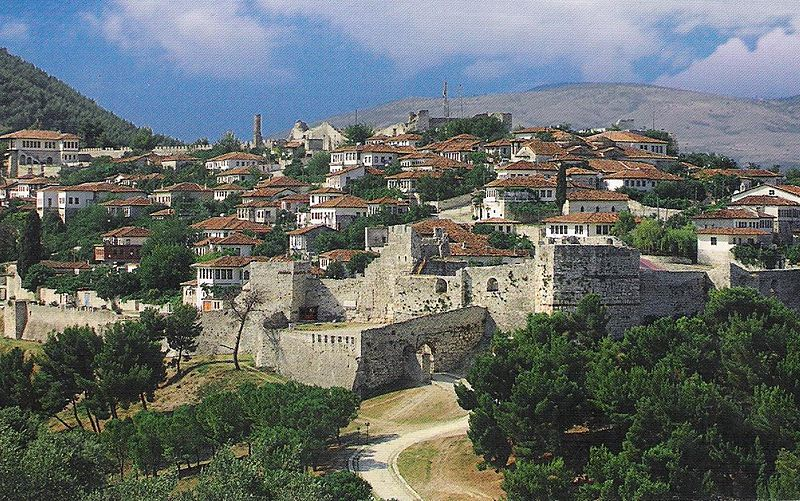
Kalaja district

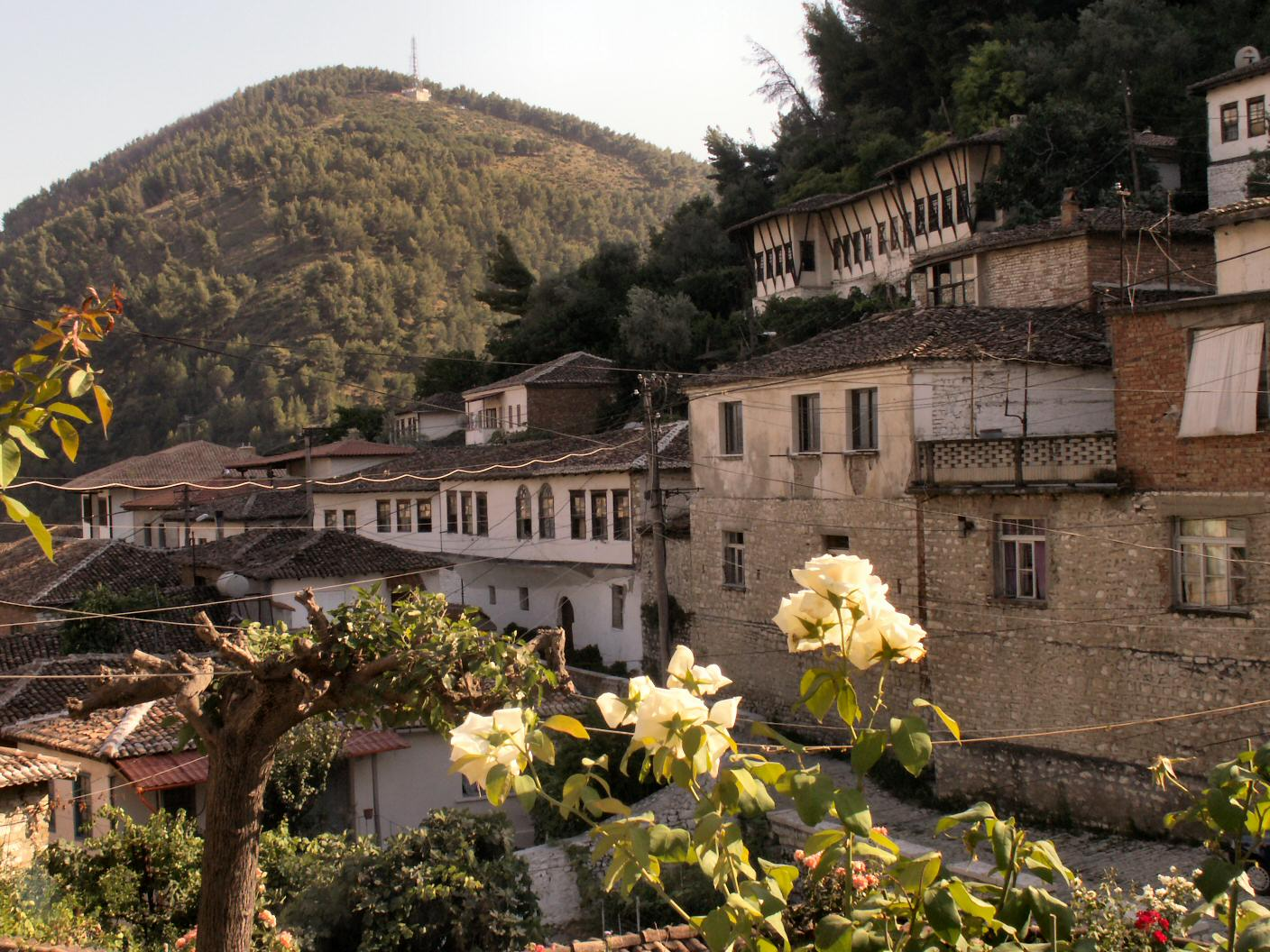
Typical houses

== See also ==
- Culture of Albania
- Tourism in Albania
- Arts & Architecture of Albania
