= St. Mary of Blachernae Church (Berat) =

Byzantine church in Berat, Albania

St. Mary of Blachernae Church Albanian: Kisha e Shën Mëri Vllahernës
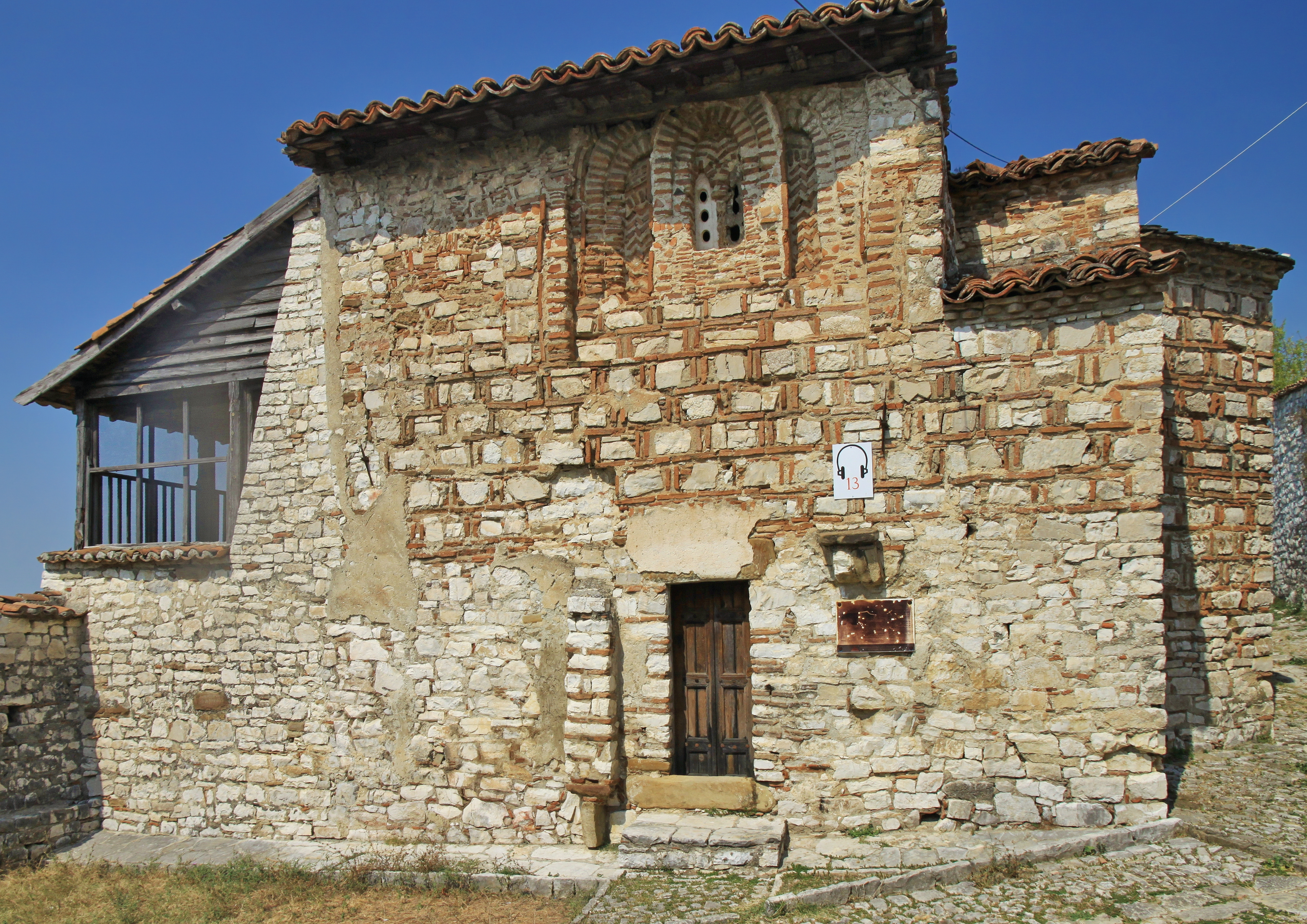
- St. Mary of Blachernae Church of Berat
- Location: Berat, Berat County; Albania
- Coordinates: 40°42′33″N 19°56′39″E
- Built: thirteenth century

Cultural Monument of Albania
- Designated: 1948

The St. Mary of Blachernae Church (Albanian: Kisha e Shën Mëri Vllahernës) is a Byzantine-era Albanian Orthodox church in Berat, Albania. It is named after the Church of St. Mary of Blachernae, near the Palace of Blachernae in Constantinople. It is believed that the church was built on the foundations of a ruined 5th century church that existed at the same place.

The church dates mainly from the 13th century and contains impressive frescoes and icons on its interior walls and ground from the 16th century. The paintings that dates from the 16th century were mostly produced by Nicholas Onufri, the son of Onufri.

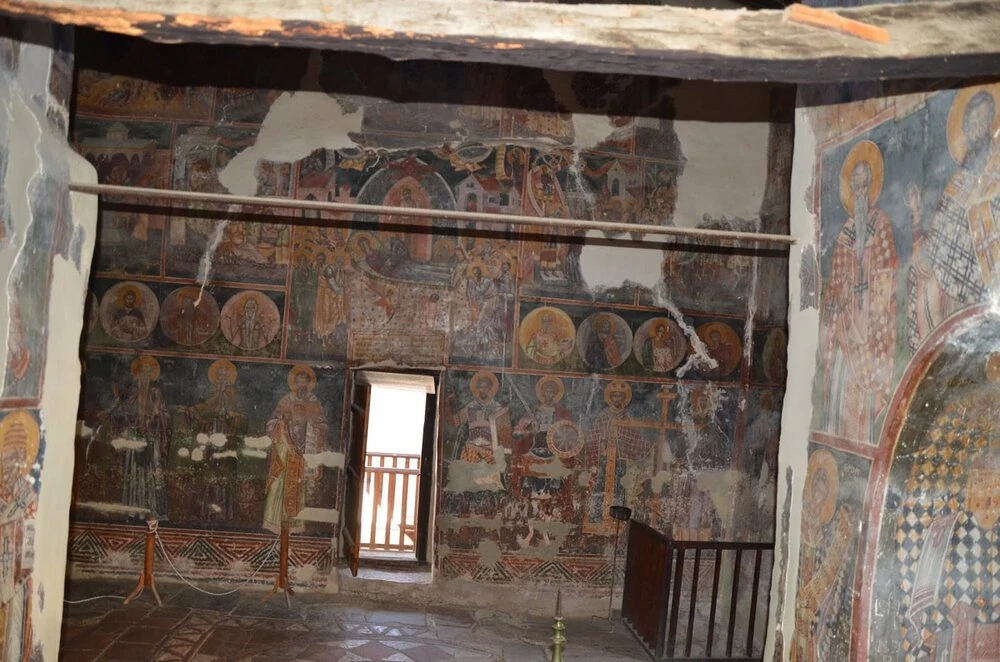
Frescoes from the church.

The church has a rectangular narthex.

== See also ==
- Tourist attractions in Berat
- Culture of Albania
- Architecture of Albania
- Byzantine churches in Albania
- 20 Churches of Berat Castle
