= St. Michael Church (Berat) =

Medieval Byzantine church in Berat

St. Michael's Church Albanian: Kisha e Shën Mëhillit
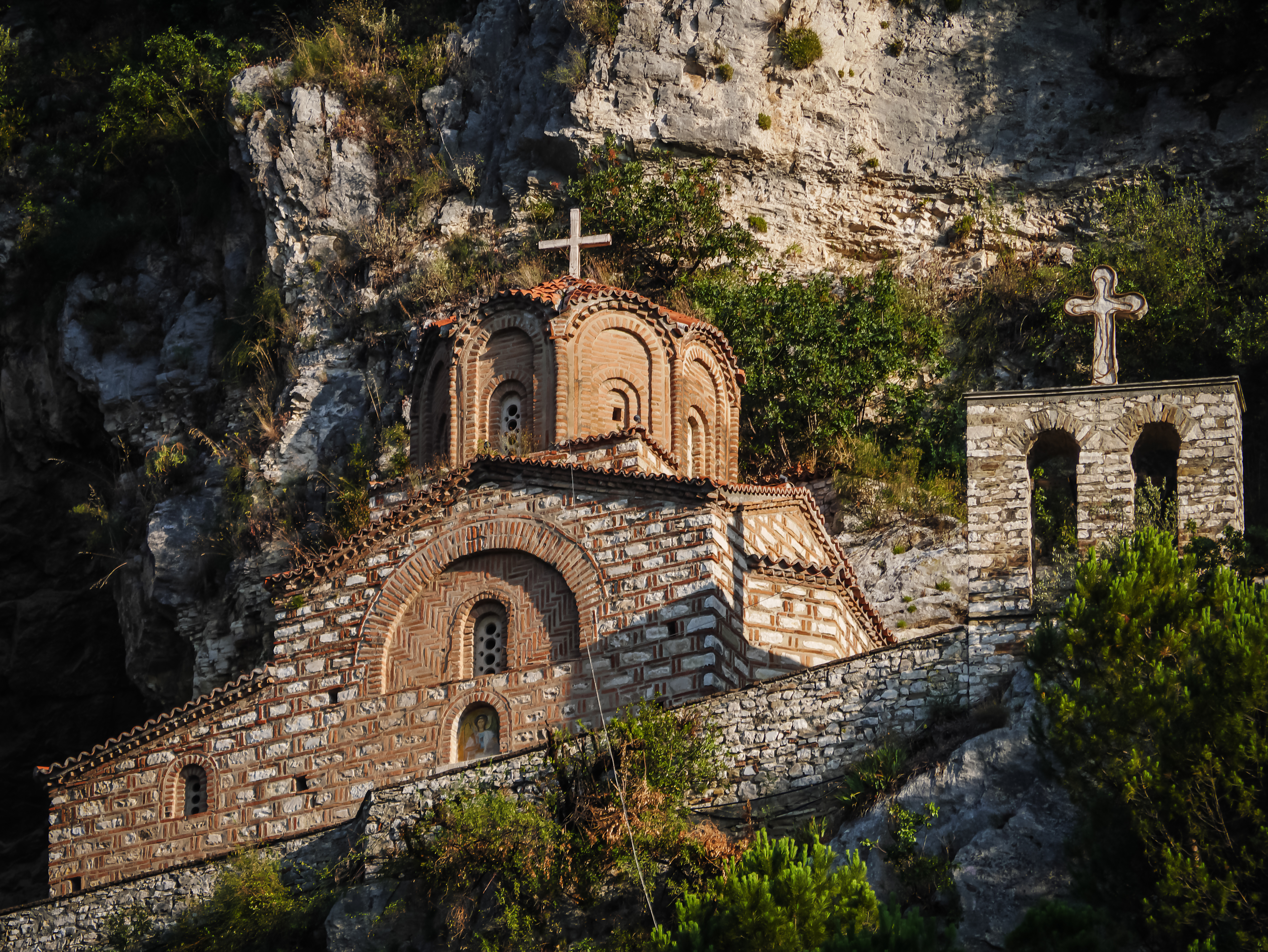
- St. Michael's Church of Berat
- Interactive map of St. Michael's Church; Albanian: Kisha e Shën Mëhillit
- 40°42′17″N 19°56′48″E
- Location: Berat, Berat County; Albania

History
- Built: fourteenth century

Cultural Monument of Albania
- Designated: 1948

The St. Michael's Church (Albanian: Kisha e Shën Mëhillit) is a medieval Byzantine-era Albanian Orthodox Church outside the Kalaja district on a hilltop of the city of Berat of Southern Albania. As part of the Historic Centres of Berat and Gjirokastër UNESCO World Heritage Site, the church was possibly constructed in the fourteenth century and is dedicated to the archangel Michael.

The church is relative small in size and was constructed on the south of the Kalaja district on a steep rock. It is a cruciform chapel instilled without any internal support, with a dome on drum and narthex on the west section. It was built on a cruciform plan with a dome on the top. The walls are characterized by combination of rows of red brick with stone. There are only a few traces of the original paintings remaining on the interior walls of the church. A collection of frescoes and icons have been preserved nowadays.

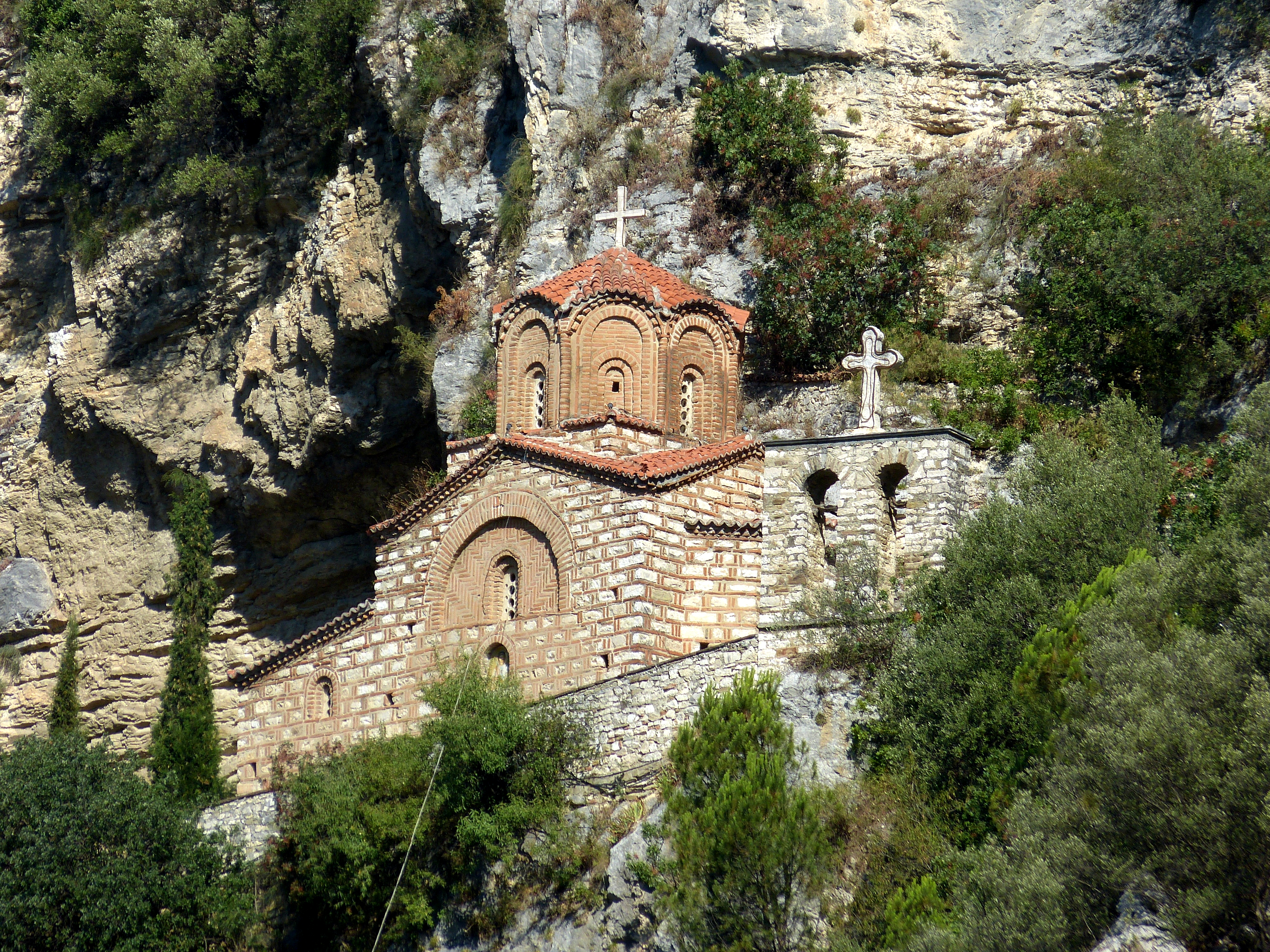

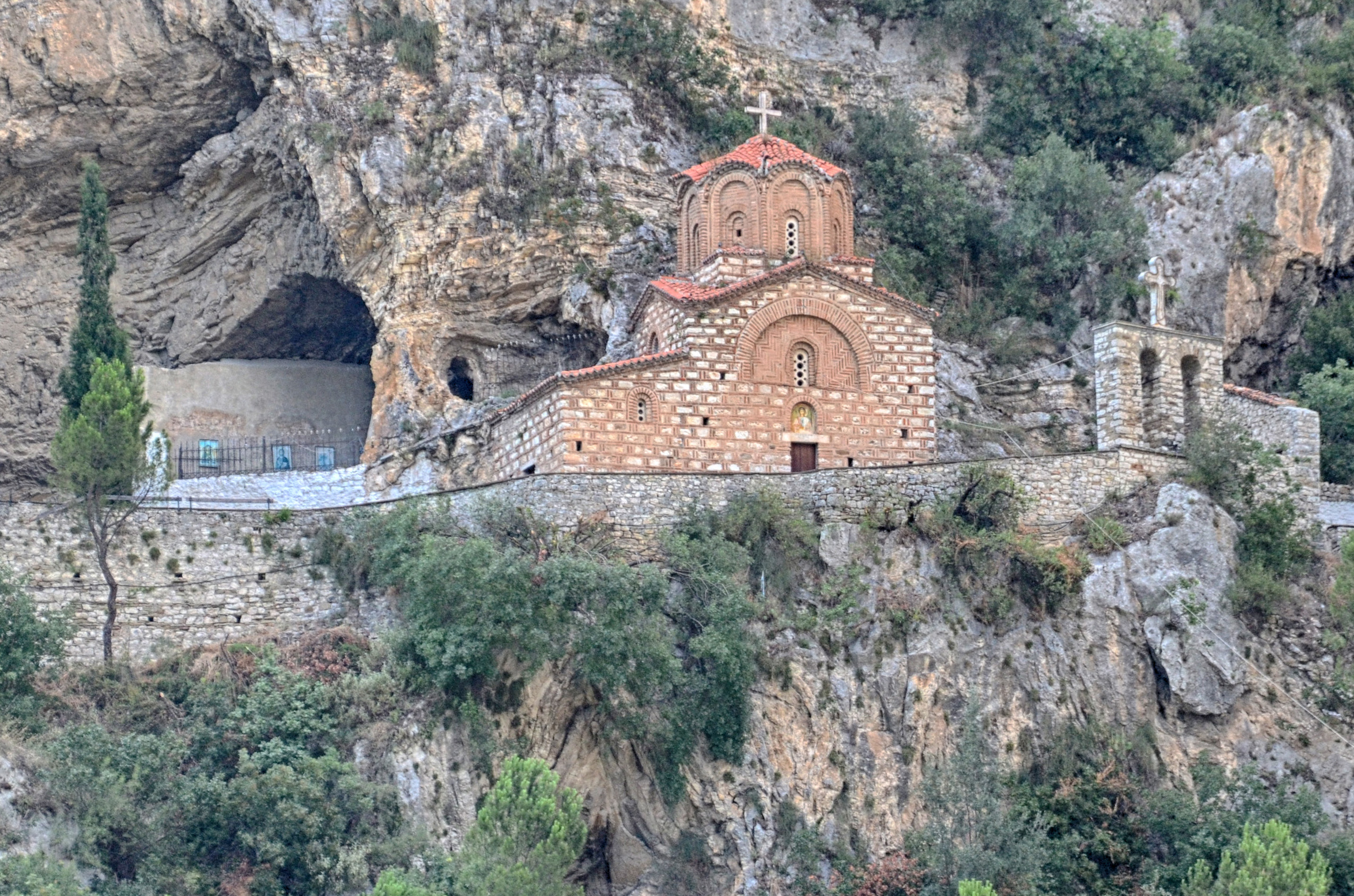

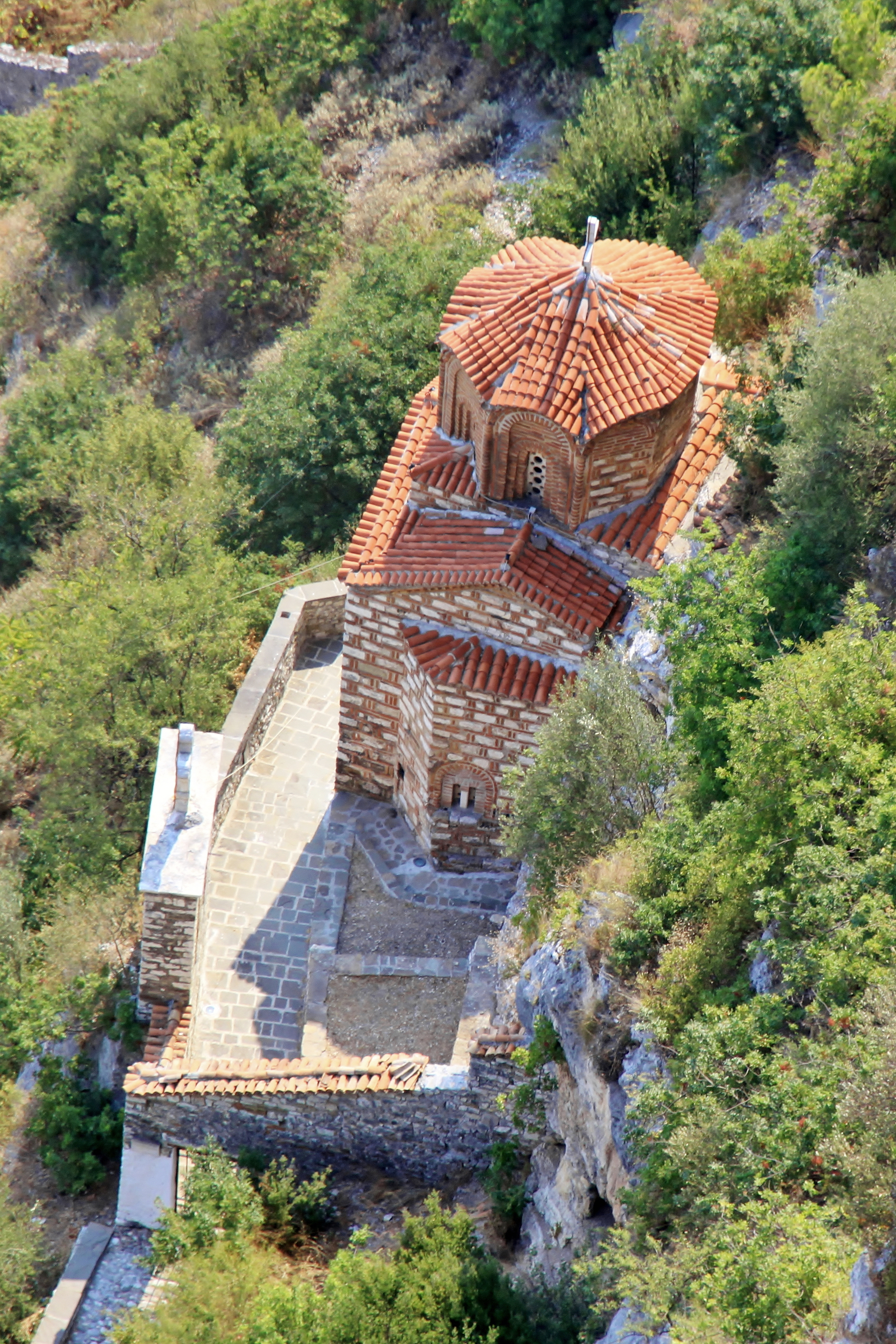

== See also ==
- Albanian Orthodox Church
- Architecture of Albania
- Byzantine churches in Albania
- Culture of Albania
- Tourist attractions in Berat
