= St. Theodore Church (Berat) =

Historic site in Berat, Albania

Coordinates: 40.7099°N 19.9463°E

St. Theodore's Church, Berat
- Kisha e Shën Todrit (Albanian)
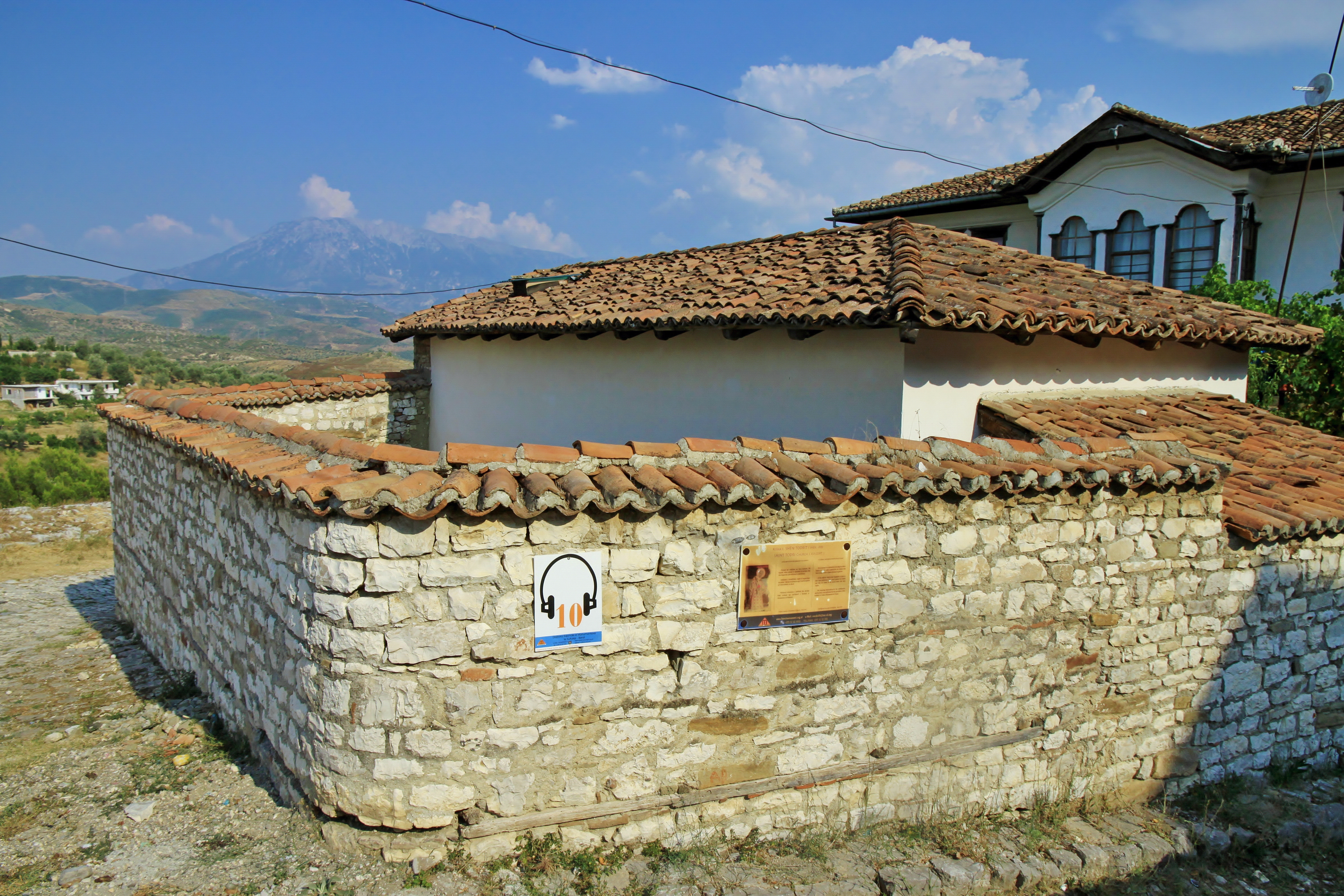
- Outside of the church.
- Interactive map of St. Theodore's Church, Berat
- Location: Berat

Cultural Monument of Albania

St. Theodore's Church (Albanian: Kisha e Shën Todrit) is an Albanian Orthodox church in Berat Castle, Berat, Albania. It became a Cultural Monument of Albania in 1948. It is one of the 20 Churches of Berat Castle.

Gallery
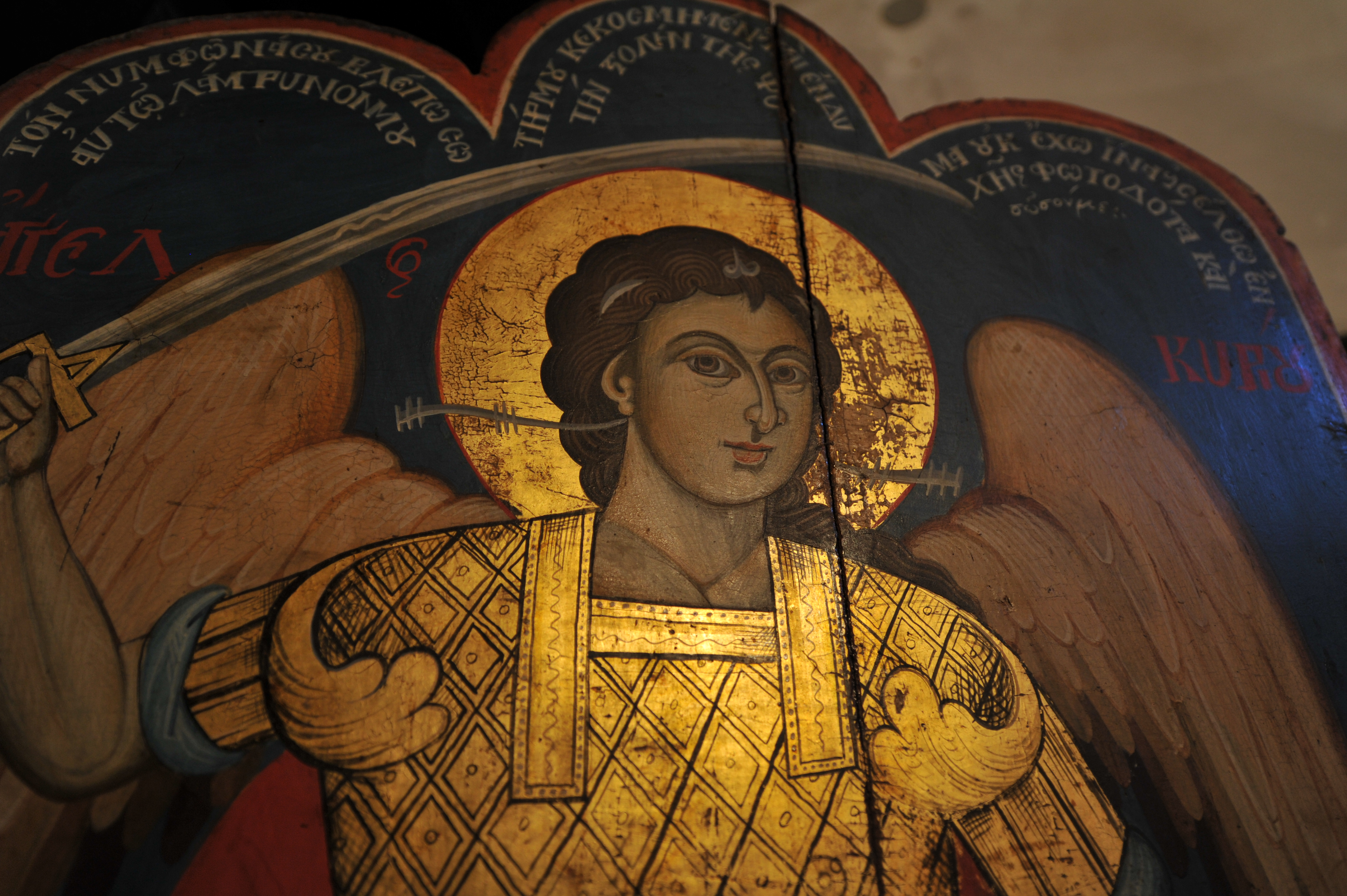
Fresco from the church.

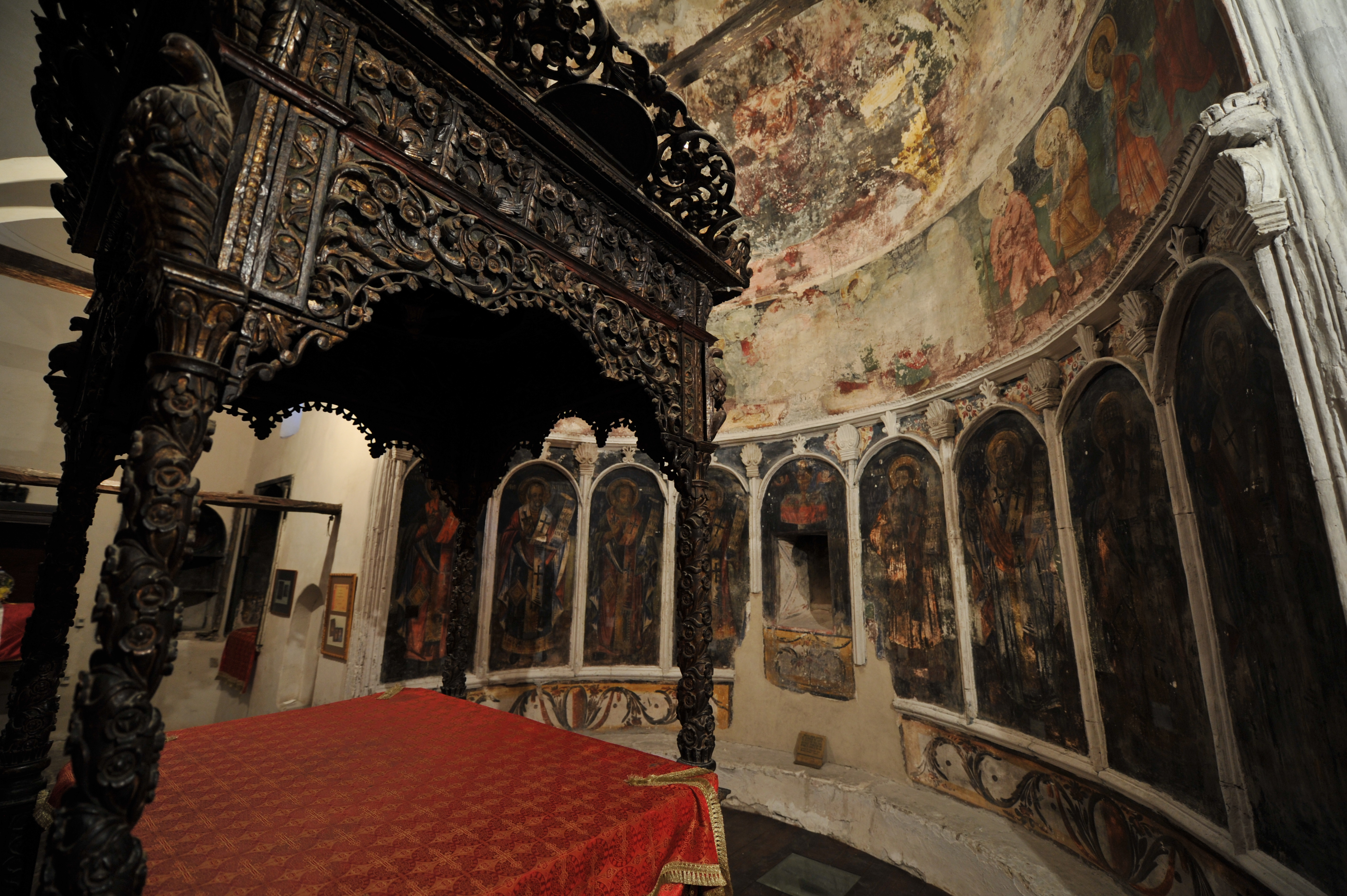
Church Interior.

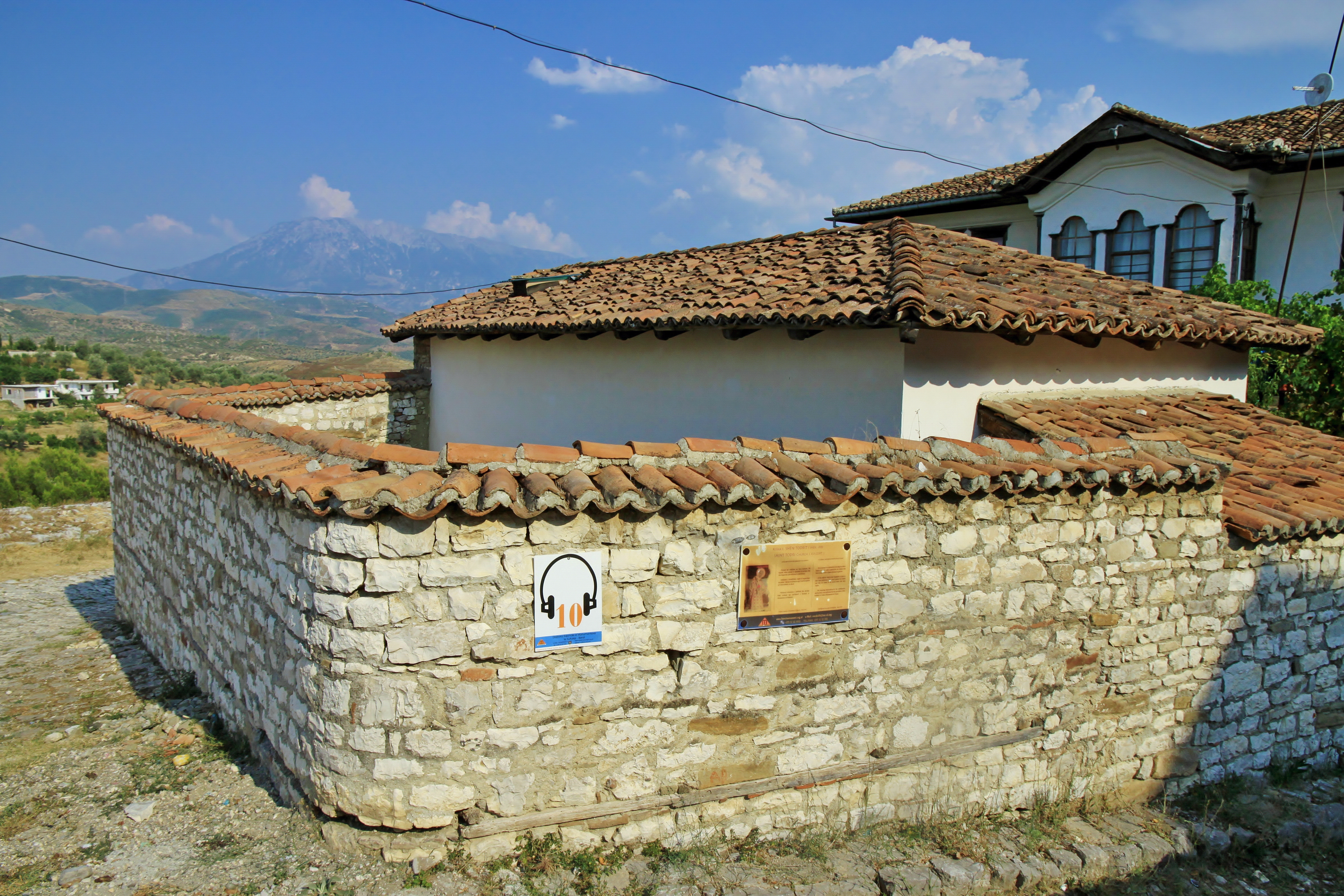
Outside the Church.

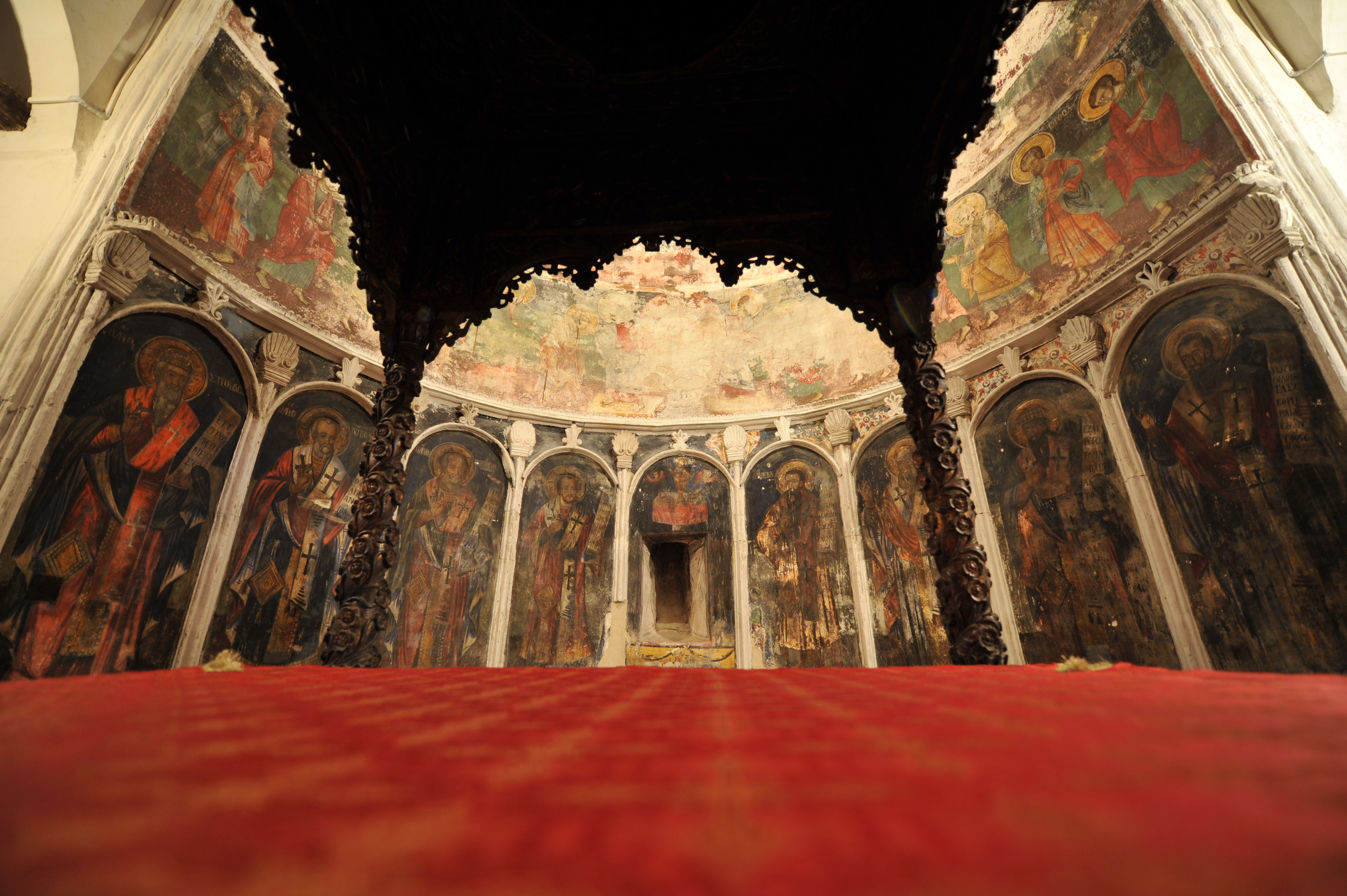
Inside the church.
