= Berat Castle =

Fortress in Berat, Albania

- Kalaja e Beratit
- Berat, Albania, 40.7067° N, 19.9522° E
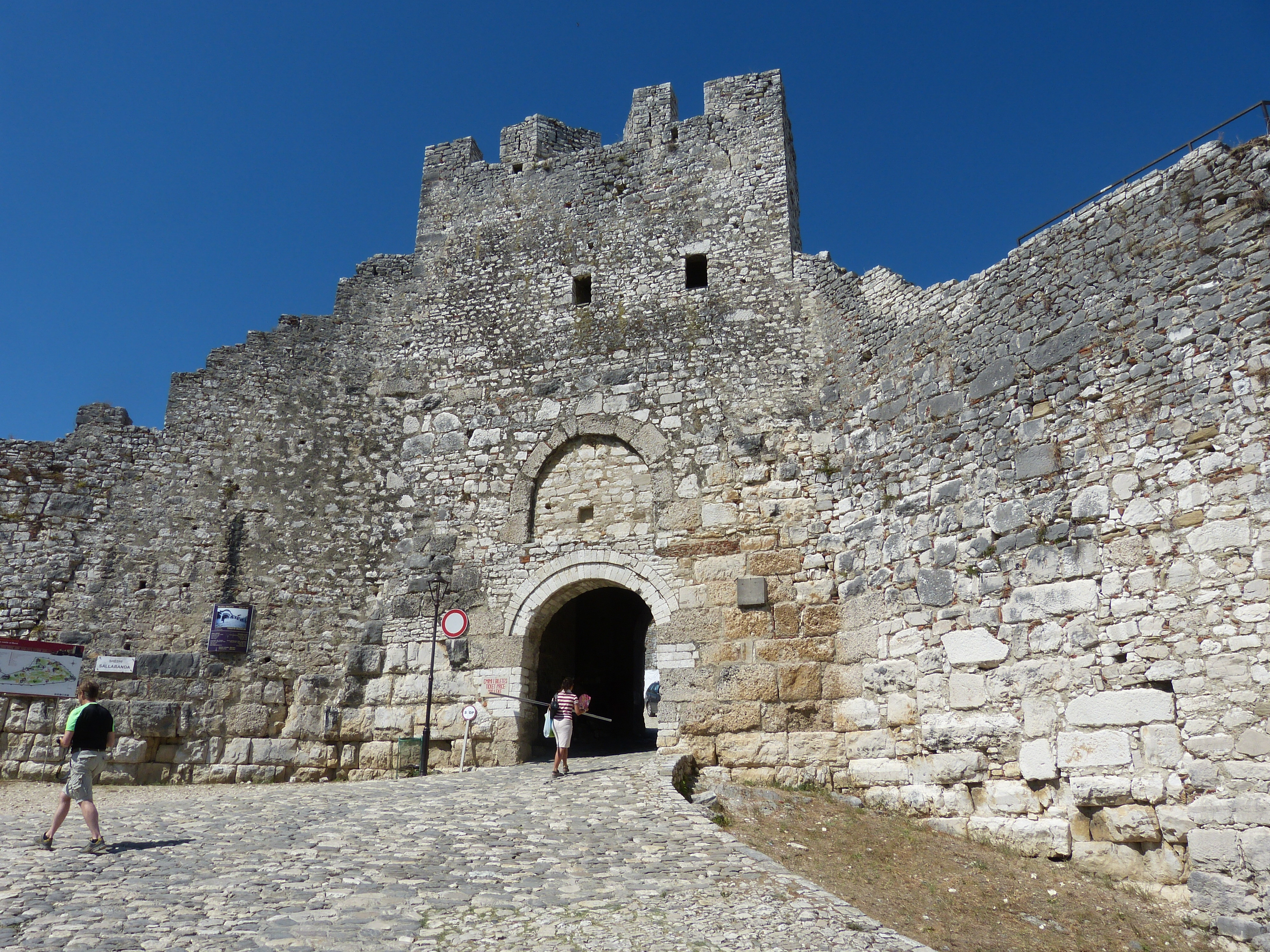
- Berat Castle

Site information
- Type: Castle
- Owner: Albania
- Controlled by: Illyrian Parthini; Roman Empire; Byzantine Empire; First Bulgarian Empire; Kingdom of Albania; Principality of Muzaka; Ottoman Empire; Albania
- Open to the public: Yes

Location
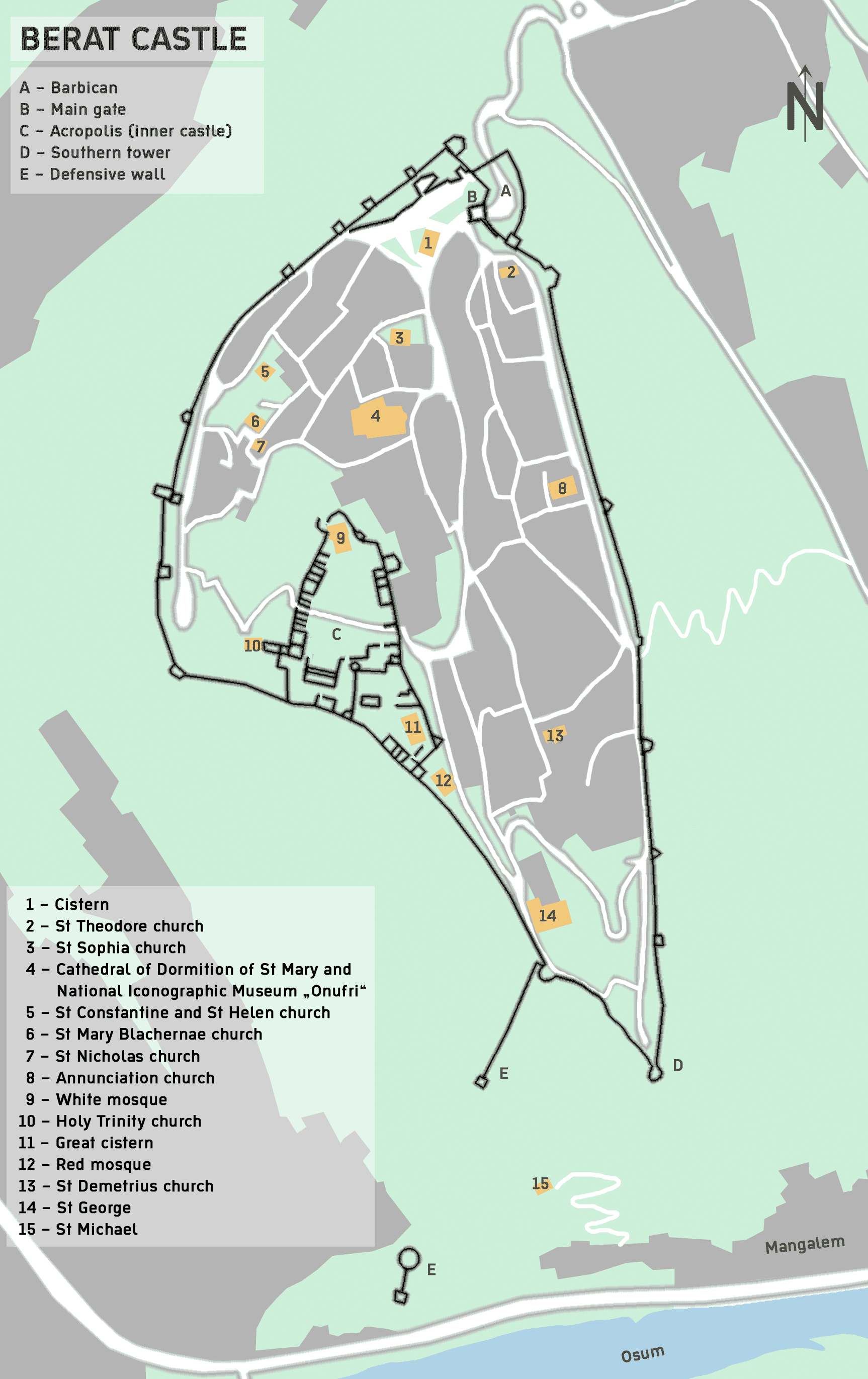

Site history
- Built: 4th Century BC
- Battles/wars: Siege of Berat (1280–1281); Siege of Berat (1455); Siege of Berat 1833; Siege of Berat 1834; Siege of Berat 1839; Siege of Berat 1847; Battle of Berat (1943)

Berat Castle (Albanian: Kalaja e Beratit), also referred to as the Citadel of Berat and castle quarter, is a fortress overlooking the town of Berat, Albania. It dates mainly from the 13th century and contains many Byzantine-era Albanian Orthodox churches in the area and Ottoman-era mosques. It is built on a rocky hill on the right bank of the river Osum and is accessible only from the south. It is situated at an elevation of 214 metres (702 ft).

== History ==
After being burned down by the Romans in 200 B.C., the walls were strengthened in the 5th century under Roman Emperor Theodosius II to protect from Barbarian incursions into the Balkans. They were subsequently rebuilt during the 6th century under the Emperor Justinian I and again in the 13th century under the Despot of Epirus, Michael I Komnenos Doukas, cousin of the Byzantine Emperor. This last phase can be seen as a Monogram formed by red bricks set in a wall of the castle. The castle was under the rule of John Komnenos Asen in the mid-14th century The main entrance, on the north side, is defended by a fortified courtyard and there are three smaller entrances.

The fortress of Berat in its present state, even though considerably damaged, remains a magnificent sight. The surface that it encompasses made it possible to house a considerable portion of the cities inhabitants. The buildings inside the fortress were built during the 13th century and because of their characteristic architecture are preserved as cultural monuments. The population of the fortress was Christian, and it had about 20 Churches (most built during the 13th century) and only one mosque, for the use of the Turkish garrison (of which there survives only a few ruins and the base of the minaret). The churches of the fortress were damaged through years and only some have remained.

Berat Castle is depicted on the reverse of the Albanian 10 lekë coin, issued in 1996, 2000 and 2013.

== Churches ==
The 20 churches of Berat Castle are Albanian Orthodox churches built inside the castle. They contain frescoes and iconostasis painted by famous Albanian icon painters such as Onufri, Kostandin Shpataraku, Zografi Brothers and more.

The castle of Berat's population was largely Christian which lead to the construction of these churches (most of them built during the 13th Century). The churches of the fortress were damaged or destroyed through years and only some have remained. They are a symbol of the castle's history. The frescoes from these churches are painted during the Middle Ages by many icon artists such as Onufri who is famous in Albania and has his iconography museum located in the city of Berat.

=== List ===
1. Church of the Holy Trinity (Berat)
2. Church of St. Michael (Berat)
3. St. Mary of Blachernae Church (Berat)
4. Church of St. Nicholas.
5. Church of Saints Constantine and Helen.
6. Church of St. George
7. Evangelistria Church
8. Church of St. Theodore (Berat)
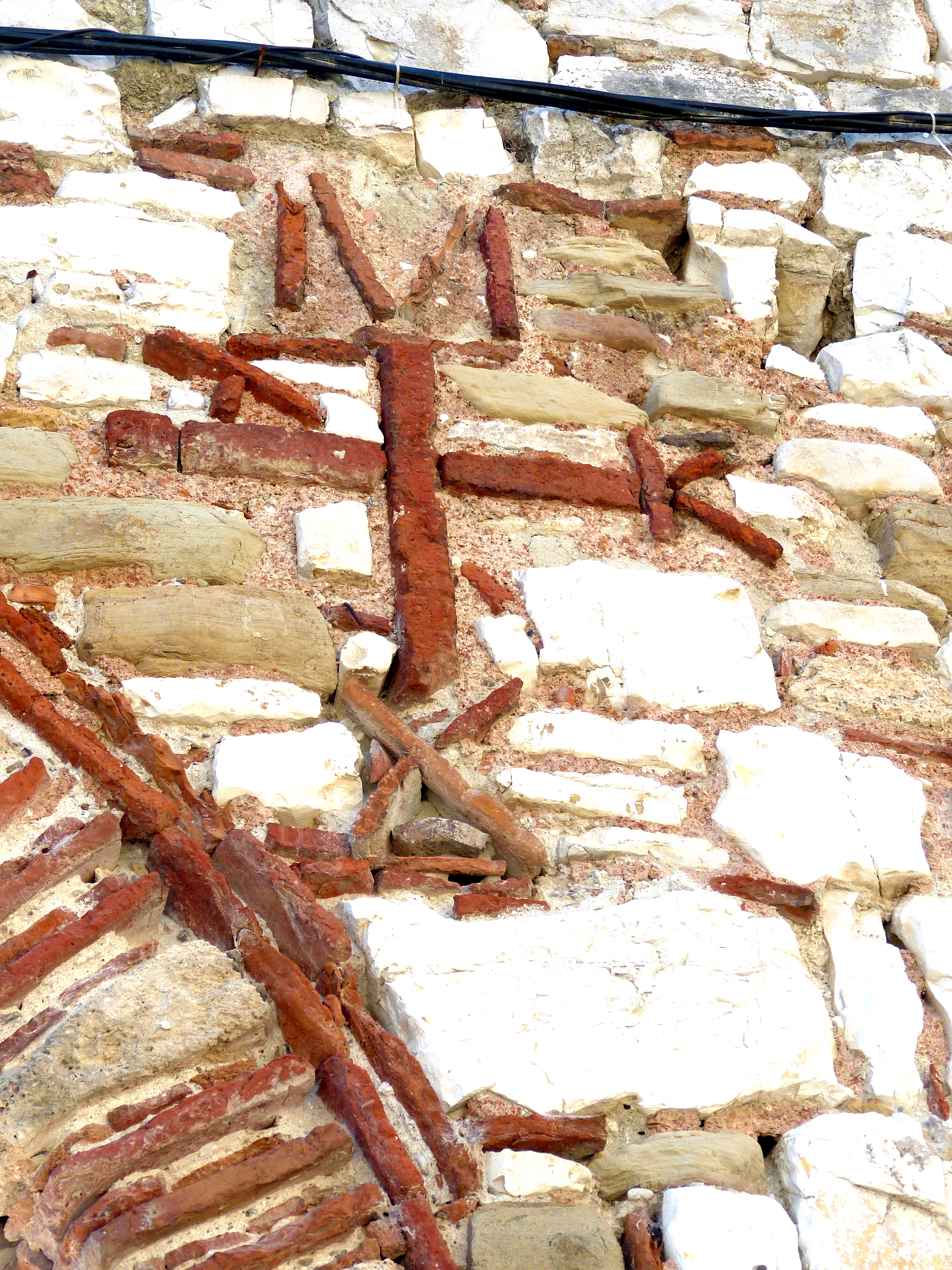
Monogram of Michael on the walls of the castle

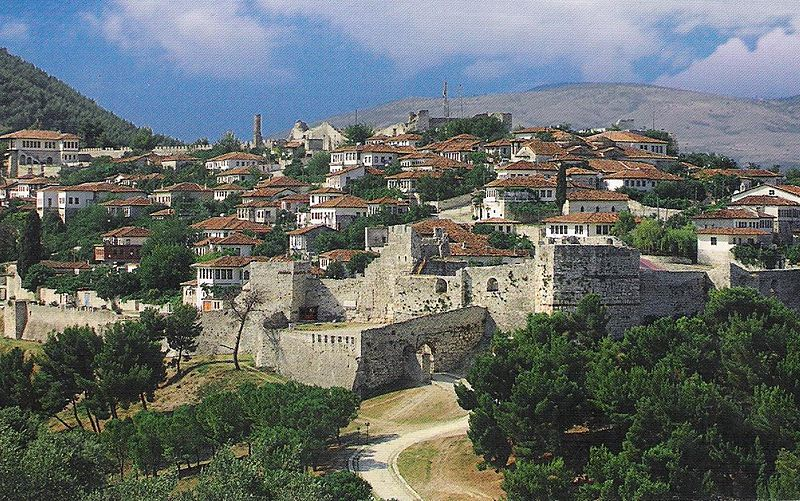
Houses inside Berat Castle

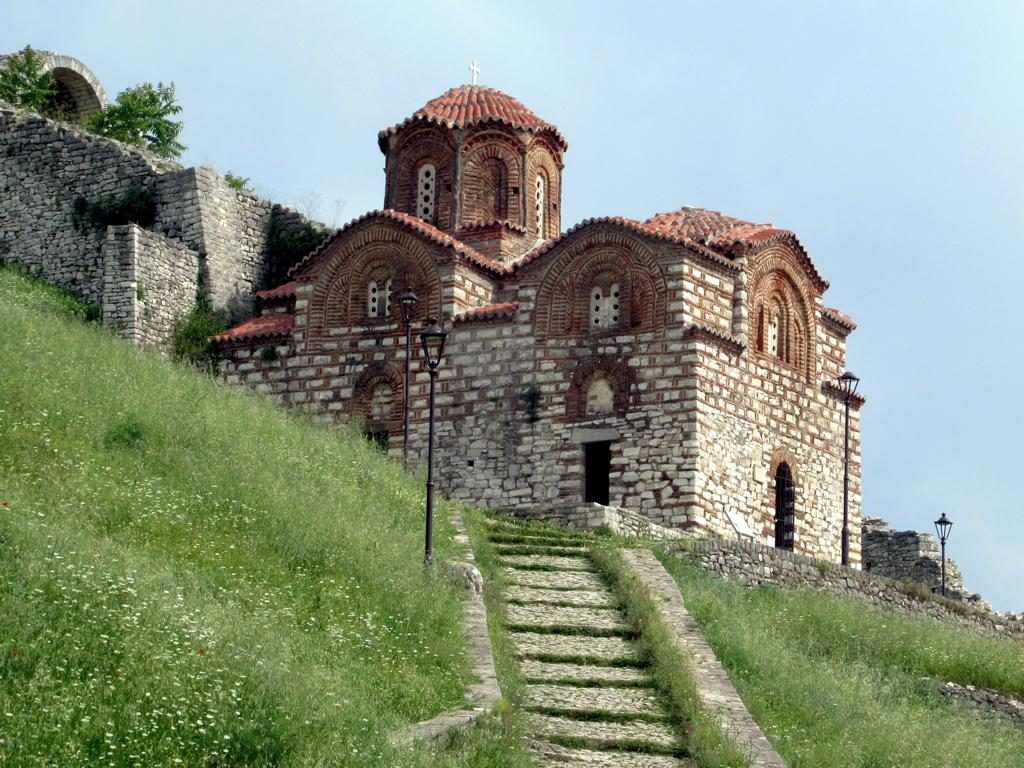
14th century Church of the Holy Trinity-(Kisha Shen Triadha)

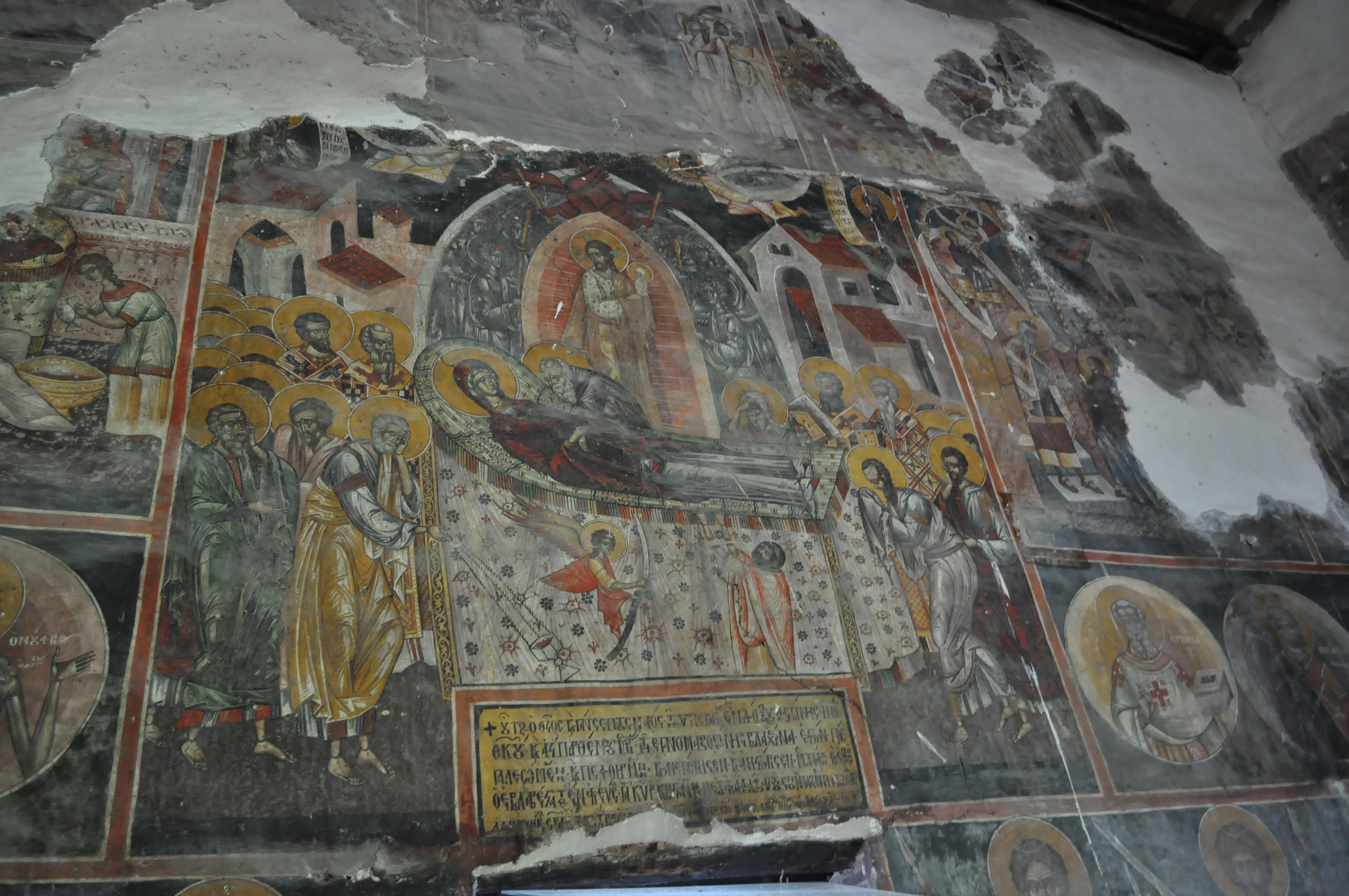
Dormotion of the Virgin Mary in Berat Castle.

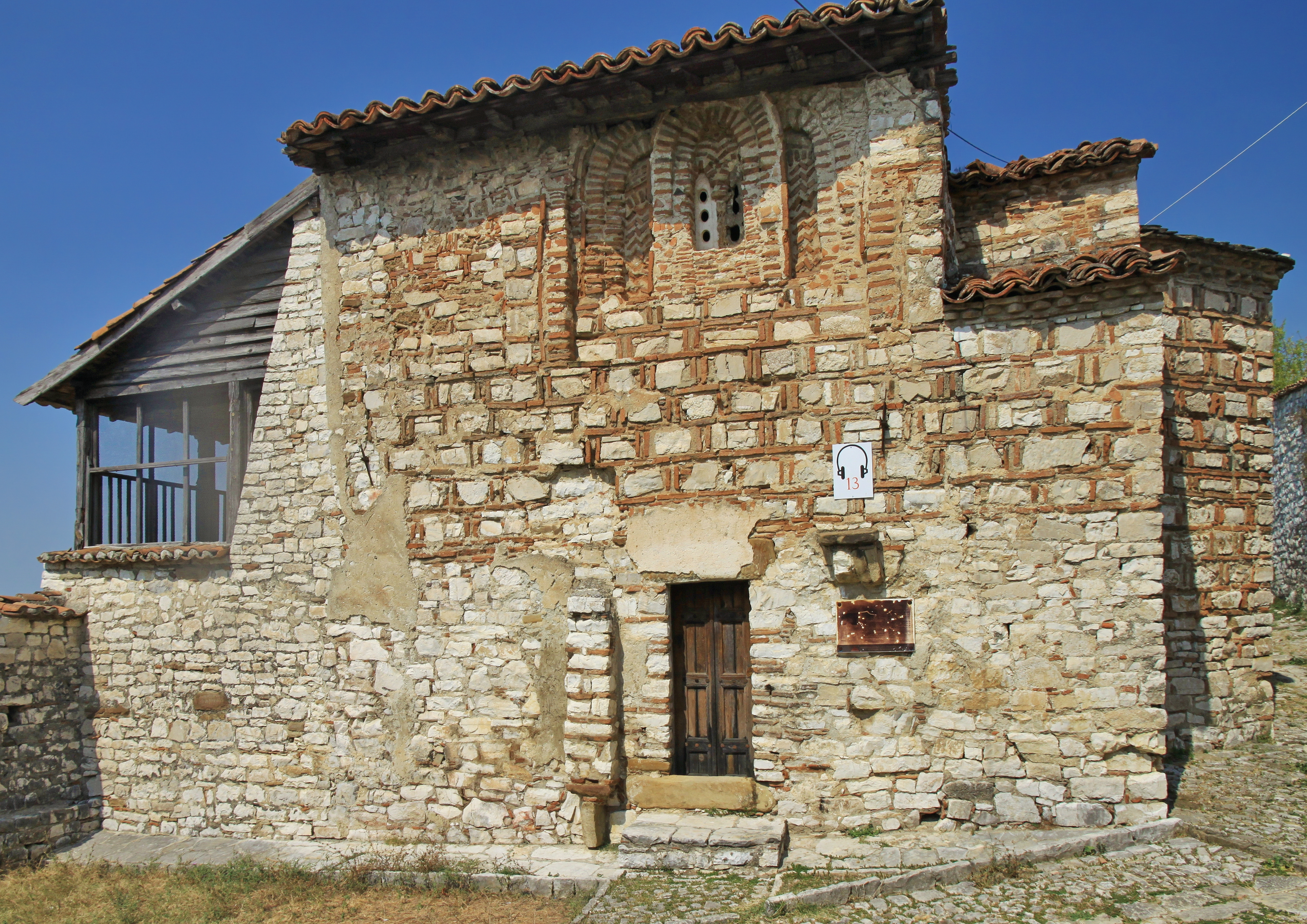
Church from Berat.

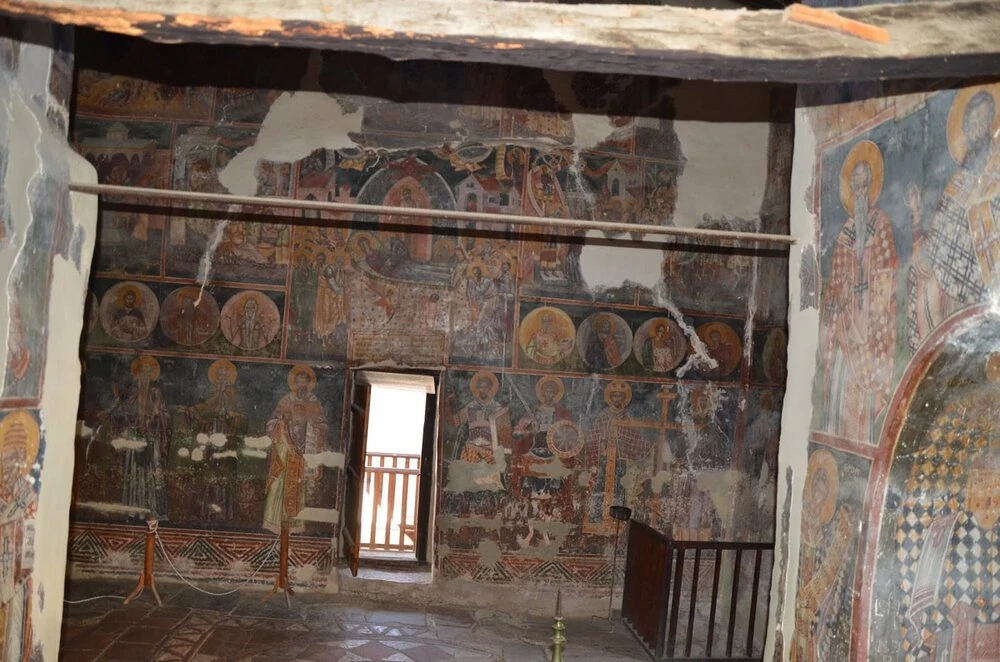
Frescoes from the St. Mary of Blachernae Church (Berat)

== See also ==
- Berat
- List of castles in Albania
- Tourism in Albania
