= Gregory of Durrës =

Orthodox Christian cleric of Ottoman Albania

- Gregori i Durrësit
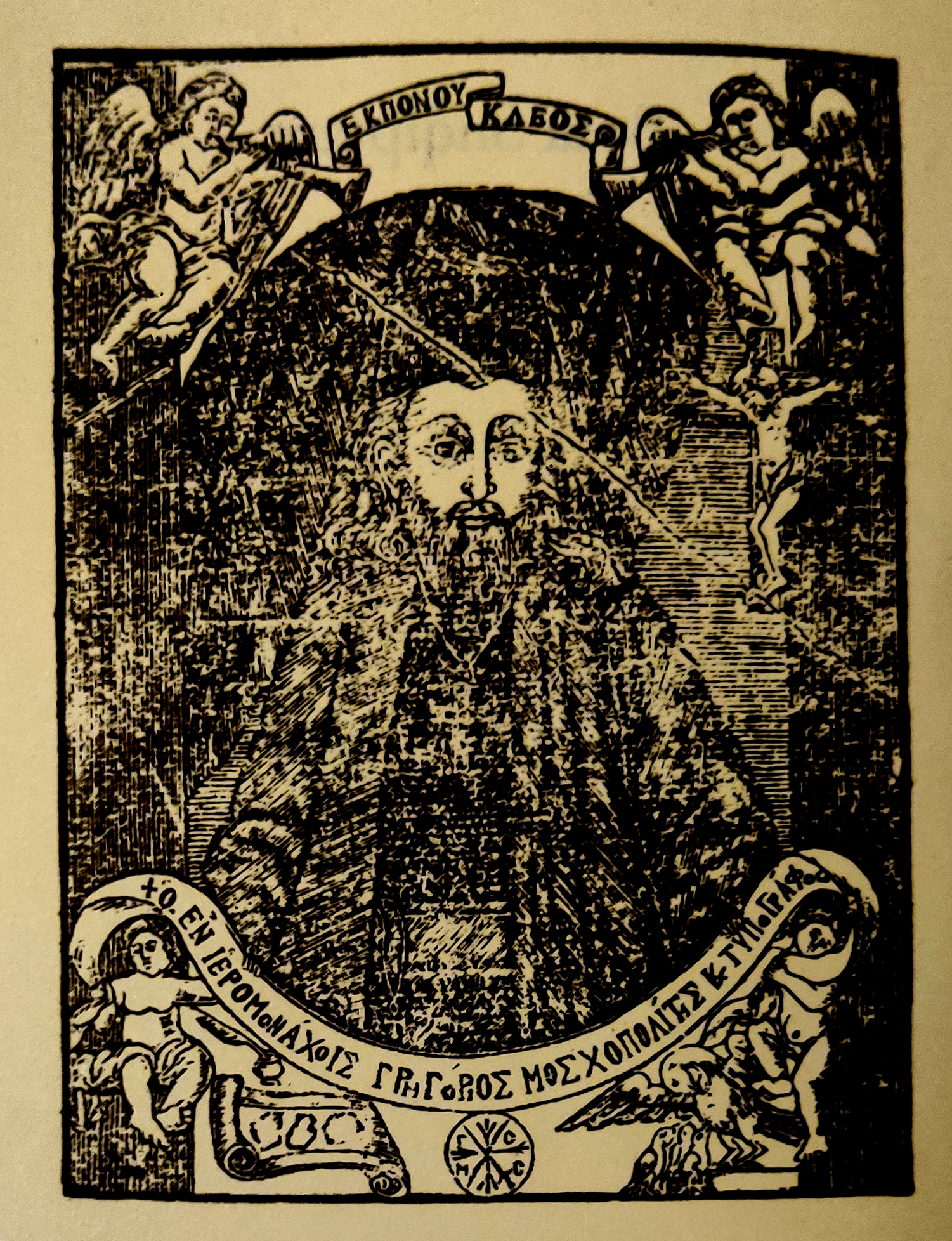
- Portrait of Gregory of Durrës, from a book printed in Moscopole (1742)
- Born: c. 1701; Ottoman Albania
- Died: 1772 (aged c. 75); Elbasan Ottoman Empire, (modern day Albania)
- Occupations: Printer, teacher at the New Academy of Moscopole, inventor of Elbasan script
- Notable work: Elbasan Gospel Manuscript

Gregory of Durrës (Albanian: Gregori i Durrësit; Grigor Konstantinidhi; Greek: Γρηγόριος ο Δυρραχίου, romanized: Grêgorios ho Dyrrakhíu; Latin: Gregorius Dyrrhachii; Gregory of Dyrrachium) (Note: Grigori is also recorded as Grigori Voskopojari (Eng: Gregory of Voskopoja) (Cornis-Pope, Marcel; Neubauer, John (2004). History of the Literary Cultures of East-Central Europe: Junctures and Disjunctures in the 19th and 20th Centuries. John Benjamins Publishing. p. 499. ISBN 9789027234537.); Gregory the Printer; or Gregory Constantinidhi (Greek: Gregorios Typografos) (Elsie, Robert (2013). A Biographical Dictionary of Albanian History. I.B.Tauris. p. 181. ISBN 9781780764313.). He has been confused with Gregory of Durrës throughout history, and may indeed be the same person.) (or Gregory the Printer) (c. 1701–1772) was an Albanian scholar, printer, typographer, teacher, and Eastern Orthodox Christian monk and cleric of Ottoman Albania who is thought to have invented a particular Albanian alphabetic script, the Elbasan script, used to write the Elbasan Gospel Manuscript. The manuscript is one of the oldest known pieces of Albanian Orthodox literature, as well as the oldest known Eastern Orthodox Bible translation into Albanian.

== Life ==
Gregory was born around the end of the 17th century. He is first mentioned in 1720 when he is noted to have met a Serbian illuminist in Ottoman Berat. Gregory is reported to have been a student of the Aromanian philosopher Ioannis Chalkeus, a significant figure in the Greek Enlightenment. Before moving to Moscopole, he worked as a teacher in Berat.

=== Academic career ===
As a budding scholar, Gregory first arrived in Moscopole some time before 1730, according to historical author Robert Elsie. (Note: According to Robert Elsie, after his move to Moscopole Gregory the cleric became confused with another, different Gregory—that being "Gregory the Printer"—and both were at times referred to as "Gregory of Voskopoja".) (Note: Most other scholars, including Max Demeter Peyfuss, think that Gregory of Durrës and Gregory of Moscopole are one and the same person.) At least in 1744 Gregory is mentioned as a teacher at the New Academy of Moscopole. Before 1731 he became a monk, during which time he most probably learned the art of printing. It is not proven where he did his training for printing, though the Venetian printmaker Nikolaos Glykys in Venice is sometimes mentioned in this regard.

=== Career in printing ===
Around 1730 Gregory founded the Moscopole printing house. The printing equipment were brought from Venice. In the printing establishment of Voskopoja are known at least 14 acolytes published, mostly portraying local saints, used for liturgical purposes. In general there are 20 different publications having the name of Moscopole printed in them between 1731 and 1760. An edition from 1769, though considered by most scholars to be from Moscopole, it lack the name of the city, thus can not be attributed with certainty. Gregory oversaw the printing press at the earliest until 1744, as can be seen from his name on the colophons. After this date his name does not appear in any Moscopole publications. The last work printed at the Moscopole workshop is a school grammar from Theodore Kavalliotis.

After 1744, Gregory is thought to have taken up residence at Saint Gjon Vladimir's Church, Elbasan. Gregory was the first to translate the Old and New Testament into Albanian, using an original alphabet he had invented sometime around 1761. (Note: According to Elsie, the alphabet was invented in 1761.) After moving to Elbasan, he might have introduced the famous Elbasan Gospel Manuscript in 1761. His presence in Elbasan is not supported by documentary evidence.

=== Later life and death ===
According to Dhimitër Shuteriqi, around 1748 he became Archbishop of the Archbishopric of Durrës for the first time. At least in 1761 this position was held by a different Orthodox leader. Only after the abolition of the Ohrid Patriarchate in 1768, Gregory was reappointed by the Ecumenical Patriarchate of Constantinople as Metropolitan of Durrës. Later in life, Gregory donated books to the local library, which was most probably destroyed in 1769 when Voskopoja was sacked.

His last signature was 1772 as Metropolitan of Durrës, most probably in Saint Gjon Vladimir, Shijon in Elbasan. This is the year when he is considered to have died.

== Two Gregories hypothesis ==
In 1932 the Bulgarian historian Ivan Snegarov was one of the first to propose the idea of two different Gregories living and working in Moscopole at the same time from 1731 to 1744. According to him, one of them known as Gregory the Printer was responsible for printing while the other known as Gregory from Moscopole was a corrector and writer. This idea was perpetuated further by the Albanian scholar Dhimitër Shuteriqi, who continued the idea throughout his work. His most important article on the topic was written in 1987 where a full biography of Gregory is attempted. More recently, the Canadian-born Albanologist Robert Elsie, following mostly on Shuteriqi's footsteps, also considered that Gregory of Durrës, and Gregory the Printer were two different people. The misunderstanding seems to have emerged from Moscopolean books themselves, where Gregory is signed by different names. According to Maximilian Peyfuss, in his books Gregory is signed in no less than seven forms: Gregory the Printer; Gregory of Moscopole; Gregory Konstantinis; Gregory Konstantinidis; Gregory the Printer of Moscopole; Gregoy Ieromonachos; and, Gregory Ierodaskalos. Coming from such a rich variety of signatures, Gregory "takes so many different names, that certain differences between them should not shed doubt on his identity."

Early authors such as Eulogios Kourilas and Mahir Domi did not accept the two Gregories hypothesis, continuing the idea of Gregory being one and the same, a printer, ieromonach, and teacher. An idea strongly defended by Peyfuss as well with his arguments. More recently new evidence seems to debase further the two Gregories hypothesis. In The Rhetoric of Theophilos Corydalleus printed in Moscopole in 1744 Gregory wrote a certain "appendix on time" which he signed as "Gregory of Moscopole the Printer". The same book was reprinted in Halle in 1768, while Gregory was still alive, and there the signature was changed to "Gregory of Durrës". This seems to be a clear evidence pointing to one and the same Gregory. Furthermore, an engraving of his portrait from 1742 (see above) has his name written as "the Ieromonach Gregory of Moscopole and Printer", revealing all of his occupancies, and proving this identity.

== Works ==
Gregory published his first work, Life of Saint Nikodemos in 1741, just a few years before he was given a new position at the New Academy in Moscopole. Other works, as author or printer, include:

- Akoluthia of Saint Theodora (1731)
- Akoluthia of St. Harallamb (1734)
- Akoluthia of Saint Seraphim (1735)
- Akoluthia of St. Naum (1740)
- Akoluthia of the Fifteen Martyrs (1741)
- Akoluthia of St. Clement (1741)
- Akoluthia of St. John Vladimir (1742)
- Akoluthia of the Seven Saints (1742)
- Pastoral Letter of Patriarch Joasaf of Ohrid (1742)
- Akoluthia of Saint Vision (1744)
- The Rhetoric of Theophilos Corydalleus (1744)

Other works printed in by the Moscopole printing press, but not by Gregory:

- Akoluthia of Saint Anthony (1746)
- Catechism (1746)
- Leonardo Lombardi [1749]
- Oktaikos (1750)
- Grammar by Kavalliotis (1760)

== See also ==
- Theodhor Haxhifilipi
- Albanian alphabet

== Bibliography ==
- Hosaflook, David (2017). Albania and the Albanians in the Annual Reports of the British and Foreign Bible Society, 1805–1955. The 500/200 Albanian Protestant Commemorative Series. Institute for Albanian and Protestant Studies. ISBN 978-1-946244-13-0.
- Shuteriqi, Dhimitër (1987). Marin Beçikemi dhe shkrime të tjera. Shtëpia Botuese Naim Frashëri.
- Domi, Mahir (1965). "Rreth autorit dhe kohës së dorëshkrimit elbasanas me shqipërim copash të ungjillit" [On the author and timing of the Elbasan manuscript with gospel translations in Albanian]. Konferenca e parë e Studimeve Albanologjike. Tiranë, 15-21 nëndor 1962 (in Albanian) (I).
- Peyfuss, Maximilian (1989). Die Druckerei von Moschopolis, 1731–1769: Buchdruck und Heiligenverehrung im Erzbistum Achrida [The Printing Press of Moscopole, 1731–1769: Printing and veneration of the saints in the Archbishopric of Ohrid] (in German). Vienna: Böhlau Verlag. ISBN 3205052935.
- Kourilas, Eulogis (1935). Γρηγόριος ο Αργυροκαστρίτης: ο μεταφραστής της Καινής Διαθήκης εις το Αλβανικόν: ήτοι αι βάσεις της αλβανικής φιλολογίας και γλώσσης η Ακαδημία της Μοσχοπόλεως [Grigorios of Gjirokastër: the translator of the New Testament into Albanian: the foundations of Albanian philology and language at the Academy of Moschopolis] (in Greek). Athens: Φοίνικος.
