= Elbasan script =

Mid-18th-century alphabet used for the Albanian language

Elbasan alphabet
- Script type: Alphabet
- Period: 18th century
- Direction: Left-to-right
- Languages: Albanian

ISO 15924
- ISO 15924: Elba (226), Elbasan

Unicode
- Unicode alias: Elbasan
- Unicode range: U+10500 – U+1052F

The Elbasan alphabet is a mid 18th-century alphabetic script created for the Albanian language Elbasan Gospel Manuscript, also known as the Anonimi i Elbasanit ("the Anonymous of Elbasan"), which is the only document written in it. The document was created at St. Jovan Vladimir's Church in central Albania, but is preserved today at the National Archives of Albania in Tirana. The alphabet, like the manuscript, is named after the city of Elbasan, where it was invented, and although the manuscript isn't the oldest document written in Albanian, Elbasan is the oldest out of seven known original alphabets created for Albanian. Its 59 pages contain Biblical content written in a script of 40 letters, of which 35 frequently re-occur and 5 are rare.

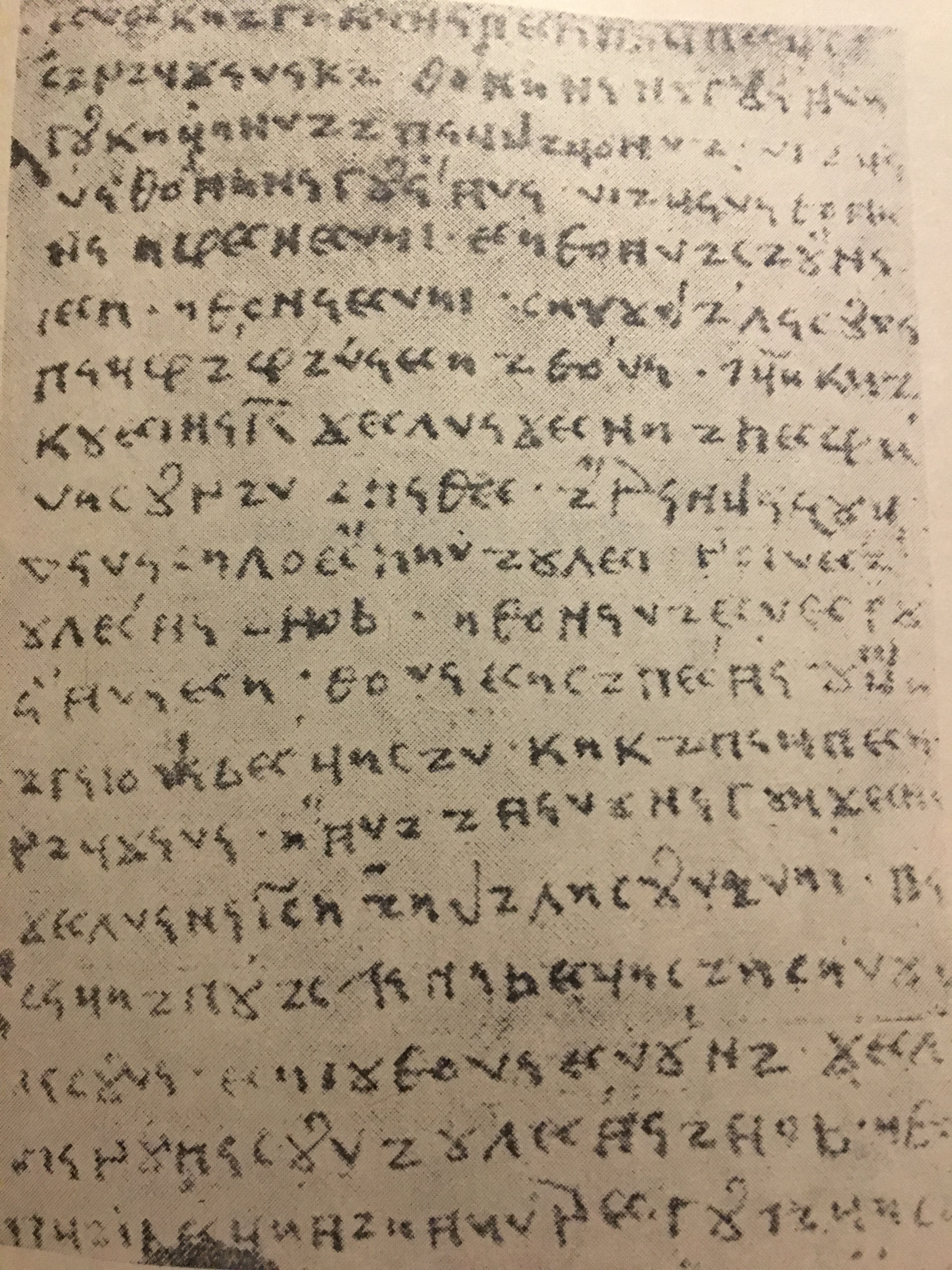
Page from the Elbasan Gospel Manuscript

== Letters ==
Elbasan
Letters	Latin alphabet	Pronunciation
𐔀	a	[a ɑ ɒ]
𐔁	b	[b]
𐔂	c	[ts]
𐔃	ç, xh	[tʃ], [dʒ]
𐔄	d	[d]
𐔅	nd	[nd]
𐔆	dh	[ð]
𐔇	e	[e ɛ]
𐔈	ë	[ə]
𐔉	f	[f]
𐔊	g	[ɡ]
𐔋	gj	[ɟ]
𐔌	h	[h]
𐔍	i	[i]
𐔎	j	[j]
𐔏	k	[k]
𐔐	l	[l]
𐔑	ll	[ɫ]
𐔒	m	[m]
𐔓	n	[n]
𐔔	n (before g and gj)	[n]
𐔕	nj	[ɲ]
𐔖	o	[o ɔ]
𐔗	p	[p]
𐔘	q	[c]
𐔙	r	[ɾ]
𐔚	rr	[r]
𐔛	s	[s]
𐔜	sh	[ʃ]
𐔝	t	[t]
𐔞	th	[θ]
𐔟	u	[u]
𐔠	v	[v]
𐔡	x	[dz]
𐔢	y	[y]
𐔣	z	[z]
𐔤	zh	[ʒ]
𐔥	gh	[ʝ] (Greek loanwords: 𐔍𐔥𐔇𐔒𐔖𐔓𐔍𐔝 - iğemonit, from ἡγεμών)
𐔦	gh	[ɣ] (Greek loanwords: 𐔒𐔀𐔦𐔆𐔀𐔐𐔍 - Magdhali, from Μαγδαληνή)
𐔧	kh	[x] (Greek loanwords)

Sample, from page 8, lines 10–14 of the manuscript:

Elbasan script

𐔗𐔈𐔙𐔋𐔇𐔋𐔇𐔝𐔈 𐔧𐔙𐔍𐔜𐔝𐔍 𐔇 𐔍 𐔞𐔀:
𐔖 𐔇 𐔄𐔀𐔜𐔟𐔓𐔀 𐔒𐔀𐔒𐔀 𐔍𐔒𐔇, 𐔏𐔈𐔎𐔖 𐔈
𐔜𐔝𐔈 𐔝𐔈 𐔄𐔀𐔜𐔟𐔓𐔍𐔝 𐔇 𐔗𐔙𐔍𐔓𐔄𐔍𐔝 𐔍𐔒,
𐔝𐔈 𐔠𐔄𐔇𐔛 𐔟, 𐔇 𐔝𐔍 𐔝𐔈 𐔎𐔇𐔃 𐔇 𐔝𐔀 𐔄𐔍𐔜
𐔇𐔓𐔄𐔇 𐔝𐔍 𐔝𐔈 𐔧𐔇𐔏𐔟𐔓𐔍𐔝 𐔝𐔇𐔒.

Transliteration

përgjegjetë Hrishti e i tha:
o e dashuna mama ime, këjo ë
shtë të dashunit e prindit im,
të vdes u, e ti të jeç e ta dish
ende ti të hekunit tem.

== Creation ==
=== The Elbasan Gospel Manuscript ===
The Elbasan Gospel Manuscript comes from the Orthodox Christian monastery of St. Jovan Vladimir's Church in the village of Shijon, west of Elbasan. With the exception of a short 15th century Easter Gospel transcript, it was the oldest work of Albanian Orthodox literature, and the oldest Orthodox Bible translation into Albanian. The authorship of the document is a matter of speculation, see the main article on this topic for details.

The manuscript was purchased a little before or around World War II by the politician Lef Nosi, who possessed a remarkable personal library and was a notable collector. It was confiscated from him by the communist regime in 1945. It is now preserved in the National Archives of Albania. The albanologist and translator Injac Zamputi (1910–1998) transcribed the manuscript, after which the Elbasan Gospel was published in standard Albanian for the first time.

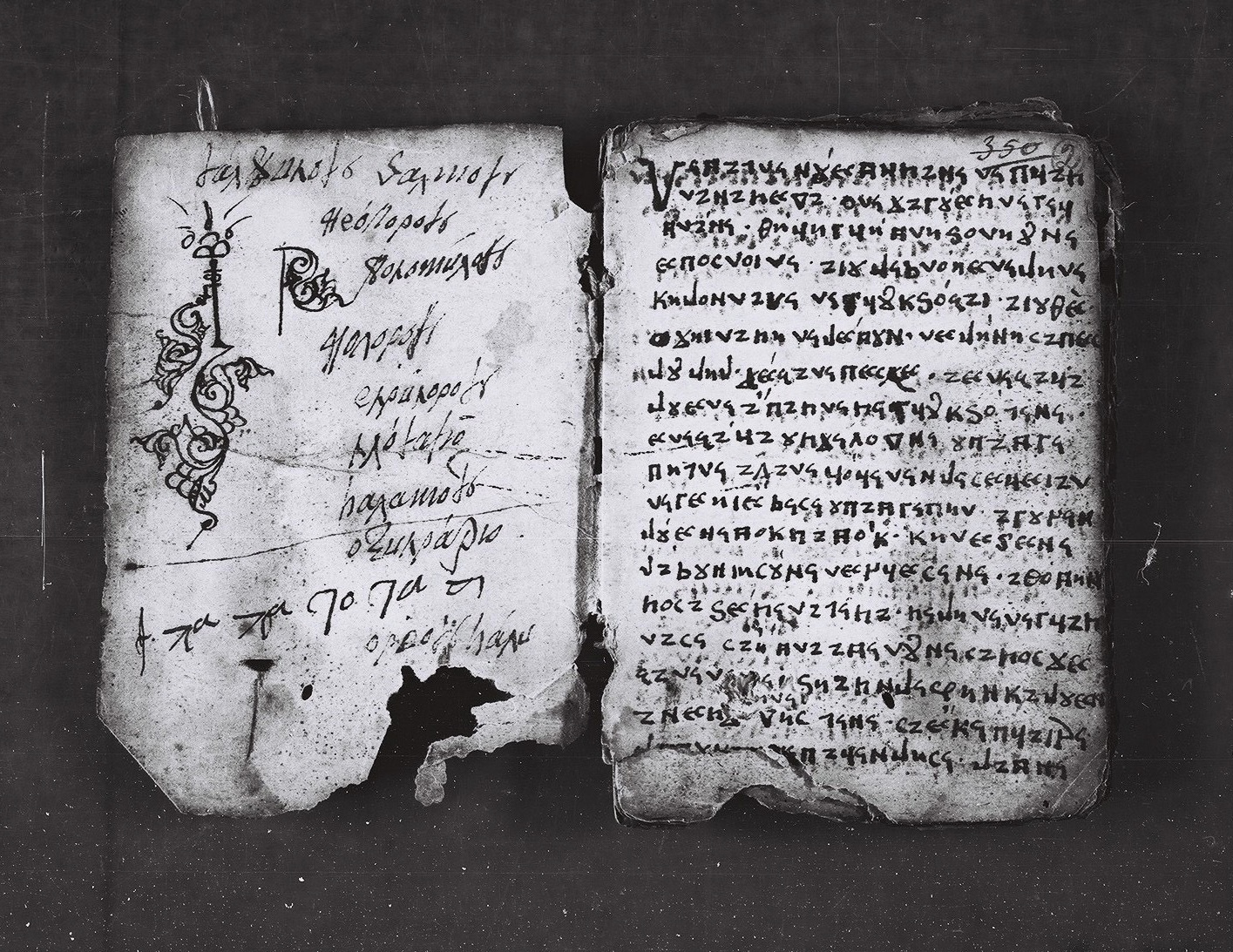

=== Authorship ===
The author of the alphabet remains unknown, though several hypotheses have been brought forward. The most accepted proposal comes from Mahir Domi in 1965, claiming the Moschopole typographer Gregory of Durrës to be the author of the alphabet. Domi bases his claim on several factors, the main one being a note by Georgios Zaviras (1744–1804) which states "Gregory of Durrës translated the Old and New Testament on a script he invented himself". Domi's hypothesis was later supported by Robert Elsie.

The name "Papa Totasi" (father Totasi) is written on the cover's verso, thus sometimes the alphabet is attributed to him. Recent studies seem to point out a certain Cosmas of Durrës (1643-1702) as the author of at least the alphabet, if not the text itself.

=== Historical analysis ===
Robert Elsie notes the author's desire to avoid foreign influences. The Latin, Greek and Arabic scripts had already been in use for Albanian, and the Cyrillic and Glagolitic scripts were also available. But the author chose to devise a new script specific to Albanian, reflecting what Elsie called "the wish of Albanian intellectuals" for a distinct writing system of their own. Furthermore, a surprisingly low number of loanwords appear in the manuscript: only three Latin loans, seven Turkish loans, and twenty-one loans from Biblical Greek (the language the manuscript was translated from). Elsie argues that the author's determination to root out loanwords becomes clear with the marked crossing out of the Turkish loan sheher "city" and its replacement with qytet, which was apparently not recognized as a loan from Latin cīvitāt(em).

== Properties ==
The Elbasan alphabet exhibited a nearly one-to-one correspondence between sounds and letters, with only three exceptions, of which two were restricted to Greek loanwords. The modern Albanian alphabet, based on the Latin script, is phonemically regular for the standard pronunciation but it is not one-to-one because of the use of ten consonant digraphs.

Dots are used on three characters as inherent features to indicate varied pronunciation found in Albanian: single r represents the alveolar tap ɾ but with a dot it becomes an alveolar trill [r], whereas a dotted l becomes velarized and a dotted d becomes prenasalized into nd. (Today this nd has become a sequence of two separate phonemes; Modern Greek has undergone somewhat similar development.) Elsie says that the alphabet generally uses Greek letters with a line on top as numerals. While some of the letters appear to have been inspired by Greek or Glagolitic forms, he considers the majority to be unique for this alphabet, whereas Shuteriqi and Domi see a strong influence of Old Church Slavonic language due to the jurisdiction, until 1767, of the Archbishopric of Ohrid.

== Unicode ==
Elbasan (U+10500–U+1052F) was added to the Unicode Standard in June 2014 with the release of version 7.0.

Elbasan^{[1]}^{[2]} Official Unicode Consortium code chart (PDF)
	0	1	2	3	4	5	6	7	8	9	A	B	C	D	E	F
U+1050x	𐔀	𐔁	𐔂	𐔃	𐔄	𐔅	𐔆	𐔇	𐔈	𐔉	𐔊	𐔋	𐔌	𐔍	𐔎	𐔏
U+1051x	𐔐	𐔑	𐔒	𐔓	𐔔	𐔕	𐔖	𐔗	𐔘	𐔙	𐔚	𐔛	𐔜	𐔝	𐔞	𐔟
U+1052x	𐔠	𐔡	𐔢	𐔣	𐔤	𐔥	𐔦	𐔧								
Notes 1.As of Unicode version 18.0 2.Grey areas indicate non-assigned code points

== See also ==
- Albanian alphabet
- Linguistic purism
- Todhri alphabet
- Vithkuqi alphabet

== Sources ==
- Trix, Frances (1997). "Alphabet conflict in the Balkans: Albanian and the congress of Monastir". International Journal of the Sociology of Language (128): 1–23. doi:10.1515/ijsl.1997.128.1. S2CID 143944248.
- Trix, Frances (1999). "The Stamboul alphabet of Shemseddin Sami Bey: precursor to Turkish script reform". International Journal of Middle East Studies. 31 (2): 255–272. doi:10.1017/s0020743800054040.
- West, Andrew. "What's New in Unicode 7.0". BabelStone. Archived from the original on 2013-11-09.
- Everson, Michael; Elsie, Robert (2011-02-03). "N3985: Proposal for encoding the Elbasan script in the SMP of the UCS" (PDF). Working Group Document, ISO/IEC JTC1/SC2/WG2.
