= Elbasan Gospel Manuscript =

Collection of translations from the New Testament into Albanian

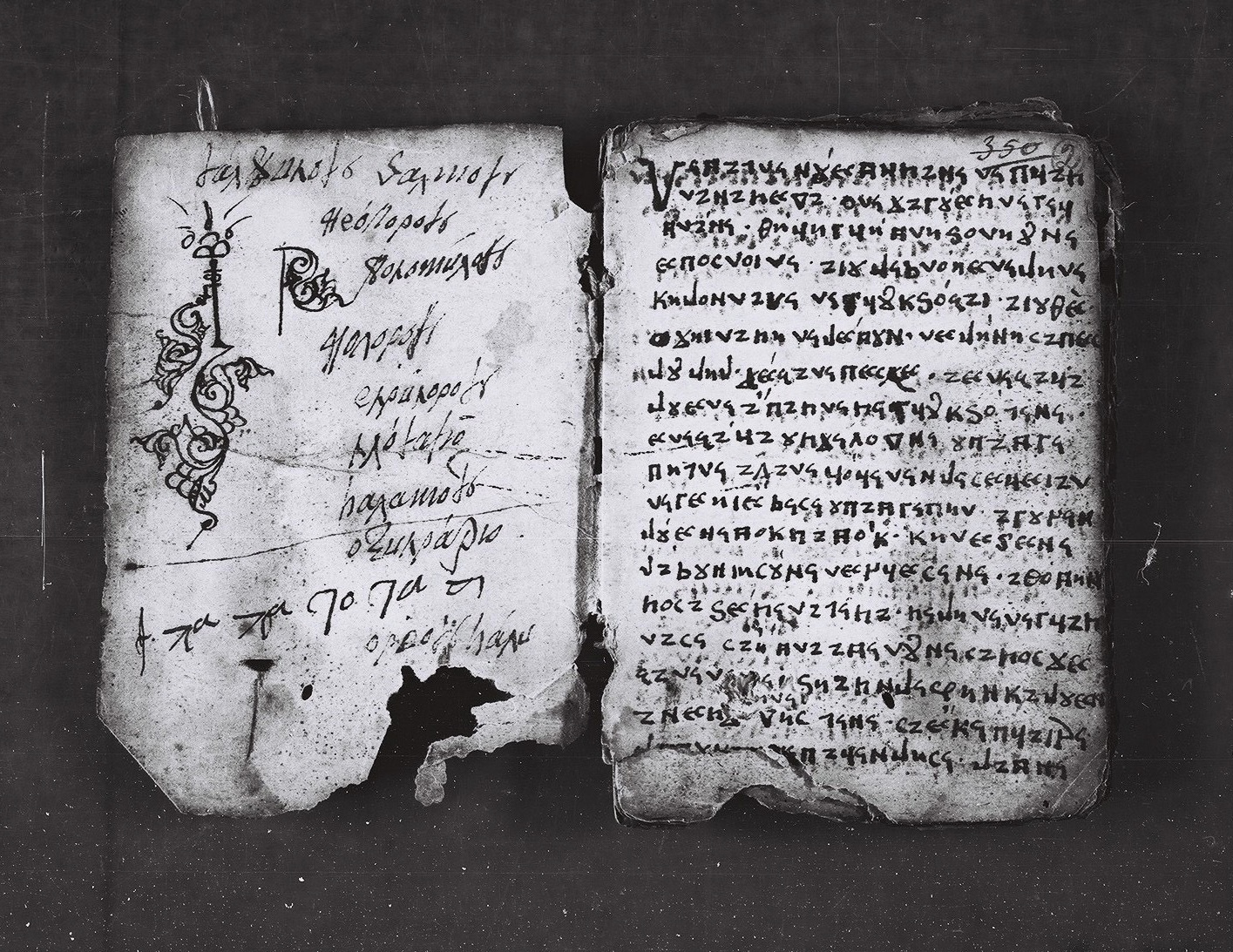
- Also known as: Papa Totasi Manuscript
- Type: Albanian Orthodox Literature
- Date: 1761
- Place of origin: Polis, Librazhd
- Author(s): Gregory of Durrës
- Size: 59 pages (10×7 cm)
- Script: 40 letters

The Elbasan Gospel Manuscript is an 18th-century collection of excerpts, paraphrases, and interpretations of passages from the Gospels, which have been freely translated into Albanian and in some cases expanded. Although the author is mainly known as the Anonymous of Elbasan (Albanian: Anonimi i Elbasanit), according to Mahir Domi and Robert Elsie the linguistic and historical evidences indicate to be the work of Gregory of Durrës. On the cover's verso with the same ink as the text, something has been written in a different script, which has been interpreted by a historian as ‘Theodoros Bogomilos / Papa Totasi’, although this tentative interpretation isn't universally accepted. For this reason the work is sometimes attributed to Totasi as the owner, if not the creator of the manuscript.

The work is presumed to be the oldest work of Albanian Orthodox literature and the first Bible translation into Albanian. According to Elsie, the manuscript was created in 1761, soon before Gregory became the Metropolitan (archbishop) of the Archdiocese of Durrës (1762–1772). The archdiocese's see was then in the St. Jovan Vladimir's Church, in Shijon near Elbasan, central Albania.

The manuscript is composed of 30 unnumbered folios, 59 pages of biblic translations and has 10×7 cm format. The script used is the Elbasan script, which consists of forty letters, most of them completely original, and not derived from any language spoken in the regions neighboring Albania. However, according to Dhimitër Shuteriqi and Mahir Domi, there is some Slavic and Greek influence in the remainder of the letters. The Elbasan Gospel Manuscript is the only document where the Elbasan script has been retrieved so far.

The manuscript was purchased shortly before or around World War II by politician Lef Nosi, who was the owner of a remarkable personal library, and a notable collector. It was confiscated from him by the communist regime in 1945. It is now preserved in the National Archives of Albania. The albanologist and translator Injac Zamputi (1910–1998) transcribed the manuscript, after which the Elbasan Gospel was published in Standard Albanian for the first time. The origin was traced back to the village of Polis near Librazhd. Polisi back then was part of the wider Shpat region in today's Elbasan county, and its population had converted to Islam in early 19th century.

== Recent studies ==
A more recent inquiry gives indication that Cosmas of Durrës (1643–1702) might be the potential author of the document, or at least of the alphabet. This was first pointed out by the Greek scholar Charalampos Minaoglou (2013), followed further by Yll Rugova (2022). The hypothesis is based on a contemporary witness Anastasius Michael (c.1675–1725) who claimed in a publication circa 1710 that the well known Cosmas, at the time residing in Elbasan, has devised a new alphabet for writing the Albanian language. Cosmas of Durrës, previously Cosmas of Kition moved to Elbasan in 1682 and stayed there until his death in 1702. He was initially the igumen of the Archbishopric of Ohrid, and since 1694 the Metropolitan of Durrës, thus being called Cosmas of Durrës. His stay in Elbasan is well documented.
