= Konstantinos Tzechanis =

18th century philosopher, mathematician and poet

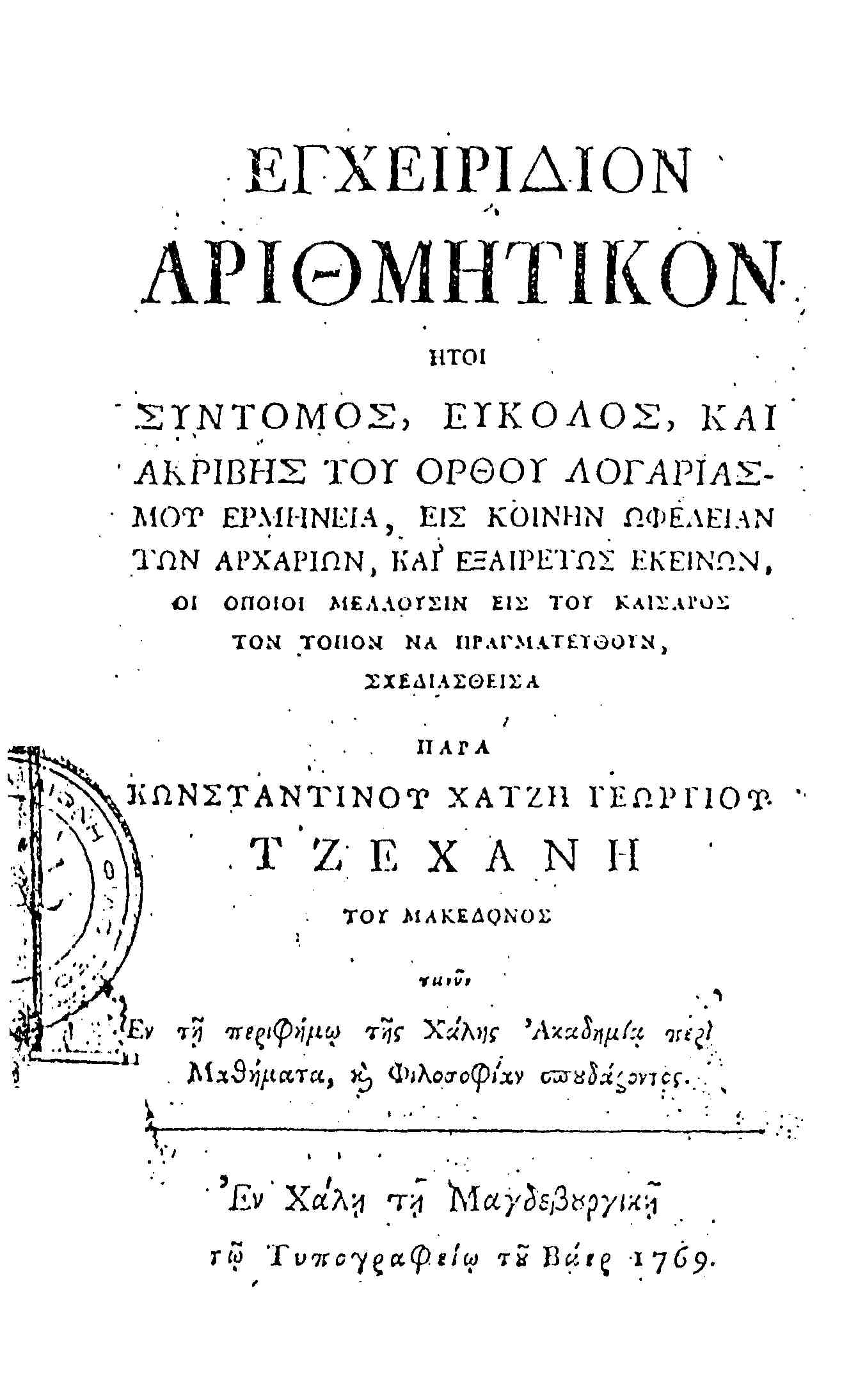
- Cover of Εγχειρίδιον αριθμητικής (Manual of Mathematics), printed in Halle, 1769
- Born: c. 1740; Moscopole, Ottoman Empire, present day Albania
- Died: 1800 (aged 60); Leyden, Netherlands
- Occupation: Scholar

Konstantinos Tzechanis (Greek: Κωνσταντίνος Τζεχάνης, Latin: Constantinus Tzechani, Albanian: Kostë Xhehani, 1740–1800) was a philosopher, mathematician and poet from the 18th century Aromanian center of Moscopole.

== Life ==
Tzechanis was born in Moscopole (Voskopojë, southeast Albania), an 18th-century cultural and commercial metropolis of the Balkans and center of Greek culture. His ethnicity is disputed, with various sources claiming that he is of Albanian, Aromanian or Greek origin.

Tzechanis initially studied in his home town with Theodore Kavalliotis being his teacher in the New Academy. He later attended lessons in Modra, today in Slovakia. At 1760, he moved together with his parents to Vienna, where his father became a merchant. Tzechanis became a teacher at the Greek schools of Temesvár, Pest and Zemun. Later in 1768–74 he went to Halle, then a city of the Kingdom of Prussia, to study literature and mathematics, and in 1776 he studied in the University of Cambridge. He also studied in Leipzig for three years and moved to several countries of Western Europe. He also lived in Wallachia, where he composed a satyrical poem.

In 1769 as a student he had written in Latin and Greek a treatise in geometry, the Introduction to Geometry: new theory of squaring the circle, 1774 (Greek: Προγύμνασμα Γεωμετρικόν, ήτοι νέα θεωρία τετραγωνισμού του κύκλου), in which he proposed a new theoretical solution to the problem of squaring the circle. Tzechanis also gave to the Swedish linguist Johann Thunmann a copy of Protopireia, one of the most significant works of Kavalliotis, he also assisted Thunmann on his works regarding the Albanian and the Aromanian languages. During his stay in Leyden, Netherlands, Tzechanis composed two large poems in Greek, praising the local university on the one and the ancient Greek authors on the other.

In the 1770s, he wrote in Greek a biography of Skanderbeg, the national hero of Albania, based on Marin Barleti's biography. He taught Latin, Greek and mathematics in Leiden University. His best known poetry work is Έπος ηρωελεγείον προς Αικατερίνην (Heroic Epic to Catherine II of Russia), a patriotic work that aimed at the national awakening of the Greek people that lived under Ottoman rule (1776), written in Latin and Ancient Greek and published in 1776. He died at 1800 in Leyden.

== Work ==
Tzechani composed the following works:

- Εγχειρίδιον αριθμητικής, (Manual of Mathematics, Halle, 1769)
- Έπος ηρωελεγείον εις Βικέντιον Ιωάννοβιτζ τον Τεμεσβαρίου επίσκοπον, (Honorary poem to bishop Vincent Jovanovic, Vienna, 1772)
- Έπος εις τον κόμητα Φραγκίσκον Κολλάριον, (Epic to count Francis Collaro, 1772)
- Έπος ηρωελεγείον εις τον Κωνσταντίνον Αλέξανδρον φιλιππίδην τον Γάιον, (Honorary poem to Konstantine Alexander, 1773)
- Έπος ηρωελεγείον εις τον κραταιότατον και αήττητον των Ρωμαίων αυτοκράτορα, (Honorary poem to the mighty and invincible Emperor of the Romans, Halle, 1773)
- Προγύμνασμα γεωμετρικόν, ήτοι νέα θεωρία τετραγωνισμού του κύκλου, (Introduction to Geometry: new theory of squaring the circle, 1774)
- Έπος ηρωελεγείον προς Αικατερίνη Β΄, (Honorary poem to Empress Catherine II, Leyden, 1776)
- Έπη δύο (Lugduni Batanorum), (Two Epics, Leyden, 1776)
- Ποίημα σαπφικόν εις τον ελλογιμώτατον και ευγενέστατον Σκαρλάτον τον Στούρλαν, (Sapphic poem to scholar and gentleman Scarlato Sturla, Vienna, 1777)
- Επίγραμμα ηρωελεγείον εις τον ιερομονάχοις... εφημέριον Άνθιμον..., (Honorary epigram to monk and priest Antimos, Vienna)
- Έπος σαπφικόν εις την γενέθλιον ημέραν του βασιλέως των Πρώσσων Φρεδερίκου Β΄ (Sapphic poem for the birthday of King of Prussia, Frederick II)
- Δύο επιγράμματα προς τον ηγεμόνα Υψηλάντην, (Two Epigrams to lord Ipsilantis, Leipzig)

Translation from German to Greek:

- Γραμματική του Ρενίου

Translations from Ancient Greek to German:

- Κανόνας του ορθού και τιμίου βίου
- Κατήχησις του Πλάτωνος
