= Greek Academy =

Greek Academy may refer to:

- New Academy (Moscopole), an educational institution operating from 1743 to 1769 in Moscopole
- Academy of Athens (modern), the national academy of Greece
- Greek Army Academy, an educational institution in Greece founded in 1828 in Nafplio by Ioannis Kapodistrias
- Greek Film Academy, a professional honorary organization in Greece for filmmakers
