= Ivan I =

Ivan I may refer to:

- Ivan I Debranin, first Archbishop of Ochrid (11th-century)
- Ivan I of Moscow (1288–1340), Prince of Moscow
- Ivan I Crnojević of Zeta (r. 1465–1490)
- Ivan I of Bulgaria
