= St. Jovan Vladimir's Church =

14th-century church in Albania

- Kisha e Shën Gjon Vladimirit (Albanian)
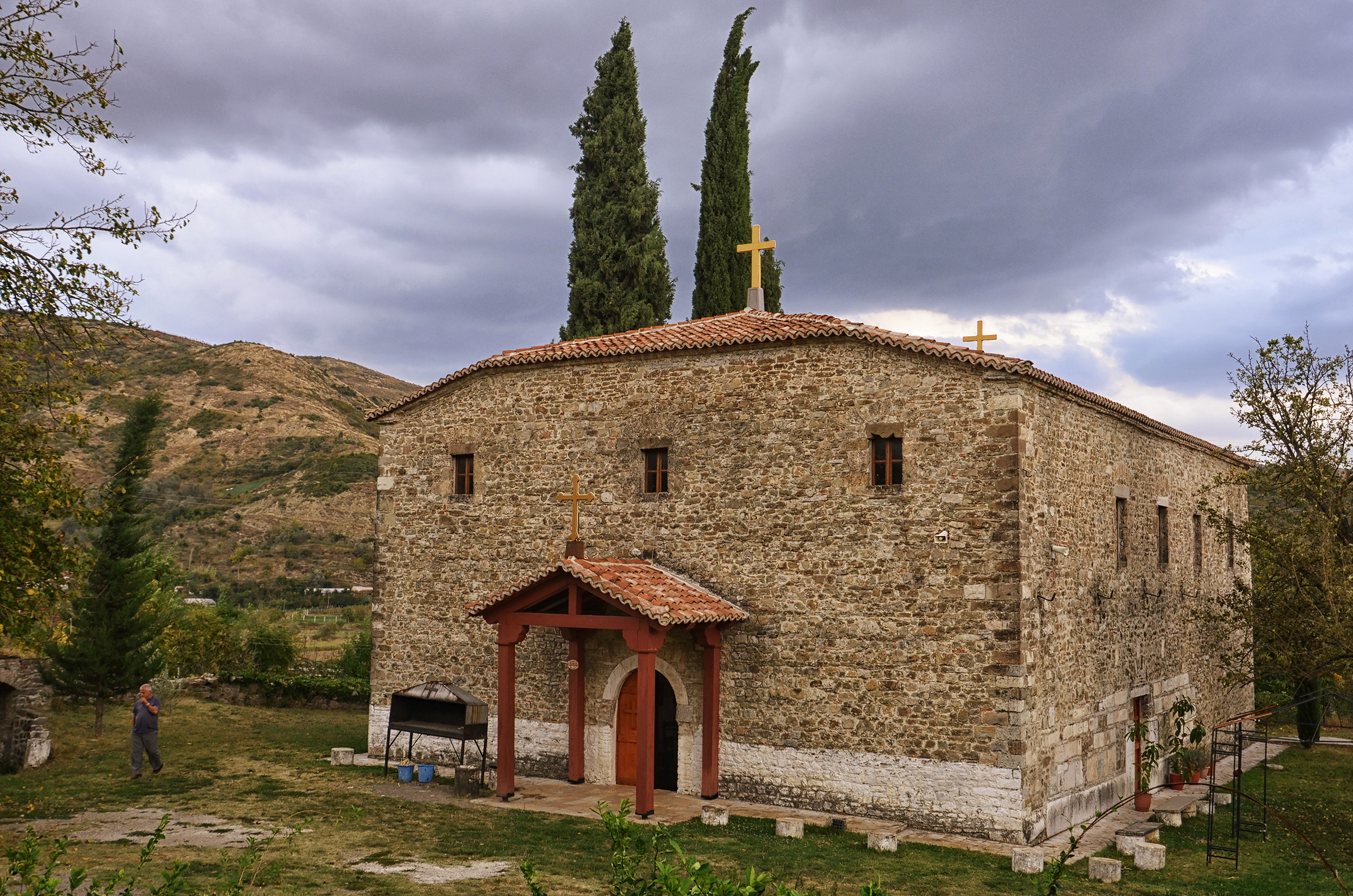
- Interactive map of St. Jovan Vladimir's Church
- 41.118333°N 20.0225°E
- Location: Shijon

Cultural Monument of Albania

Saint Jovan Vladimir's Church (Albanian: Kisha e Shën Gjon Vladimirit) is an Albanian Orthodox church in Shijon, Elbasan County, Albania. It is dedicated to the Dukljan prince and saint Jovan Vladimir, the son-in-law of the Bulgarian Tsar Samuil. It became a Cultural Monument of Albania in 1948. The first temple is the oldest large Orthodox basilica from the times of Tsar Samuil, rebuilt as present church by the Thopia family in 1381. Karl Thopia, the Prince of Albania, died in 1388 and was buried in Saint John Vladimir's Church.

During the 18th century Kostandin Shpataraku painted the walls of the church. An Orthodox monastery grew around the church, and became the seat of the newly founded Archdiocese of Dyrrhachium in the 18th century. Gregory of Durrës, the archbishop of Dyrrhachium from 1768 to 1772, wrote there the Elbasan Gospel Manuscript, the oldest work of Albanian Orthodox literature; the manuscript is also notable for being the only document in the Albanian Elbasan script. Later on, in the late 18th and early 19th century, the monastery became an important center for writing the Albanian language in another original script known as the Todhri alphabet.

== Gallery ==
Images of the Church
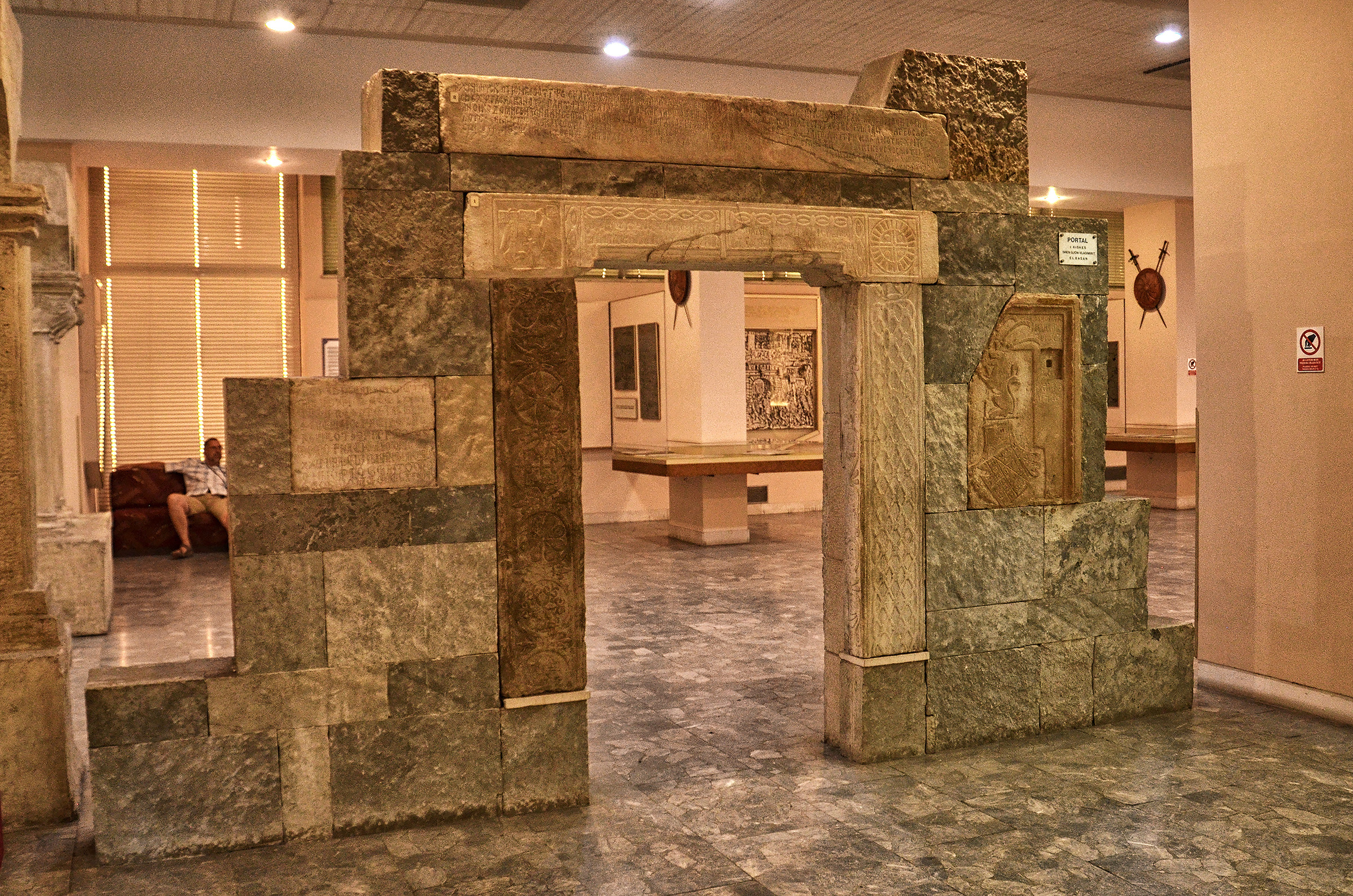
Reconstruction of the original entrance to the church in the medieval era now located in the National History Museum

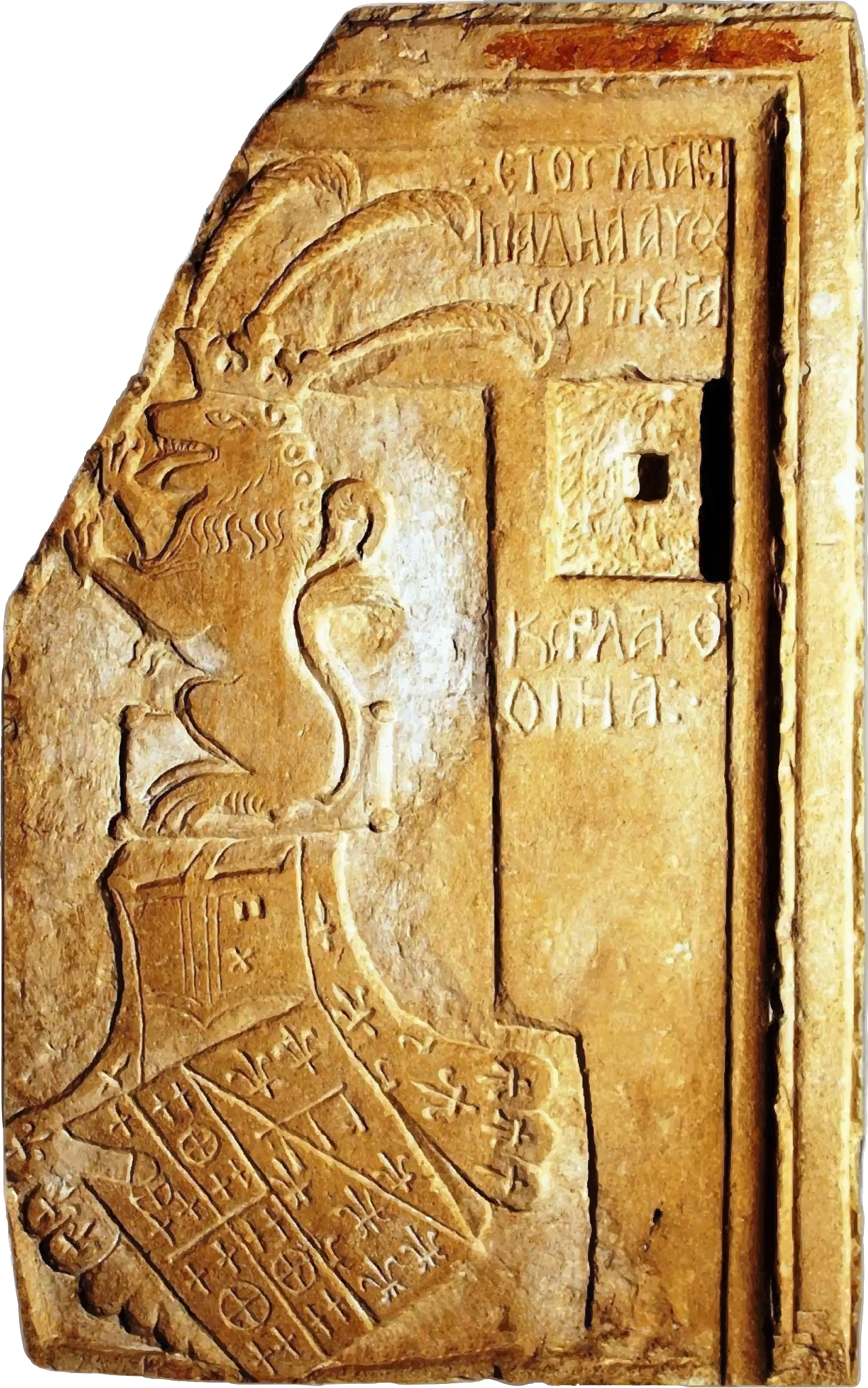
Coat of arms of Karl Thopia

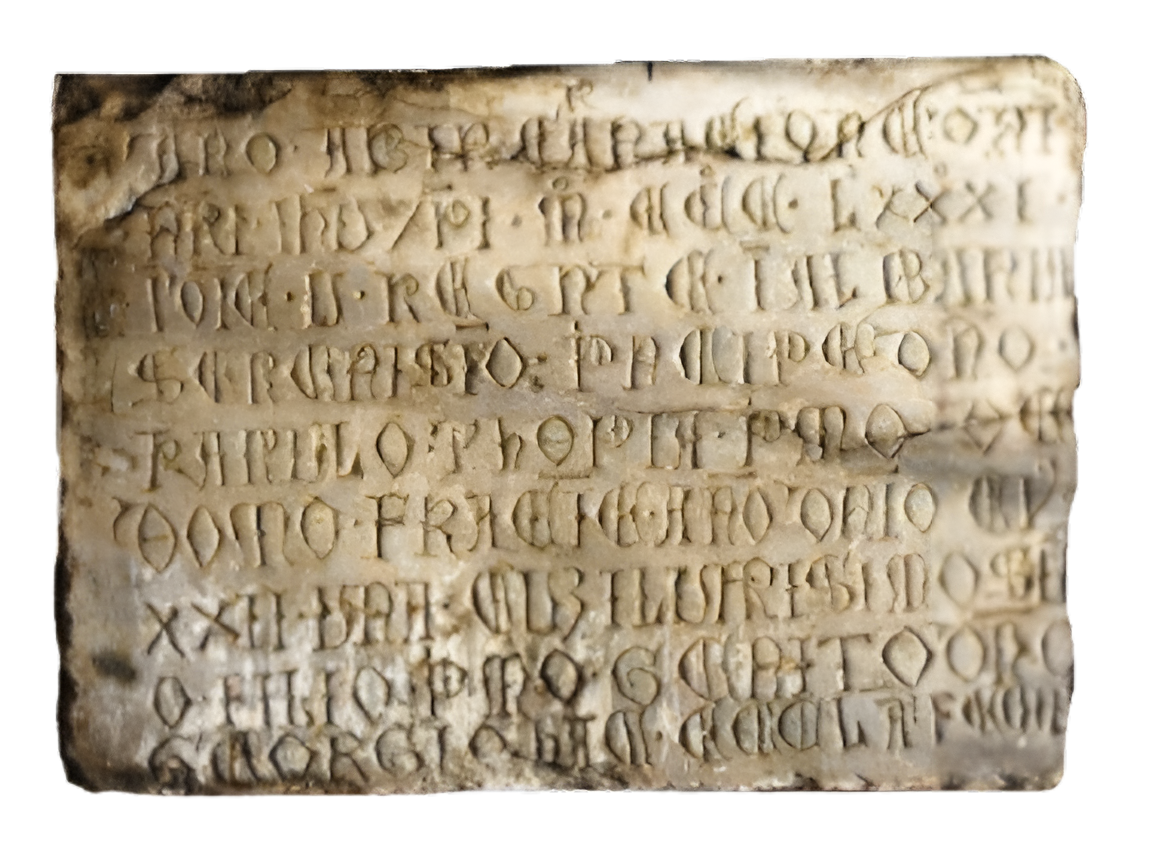
Marble slab that talks about Karl Thopia and his son Gjergj Thopia

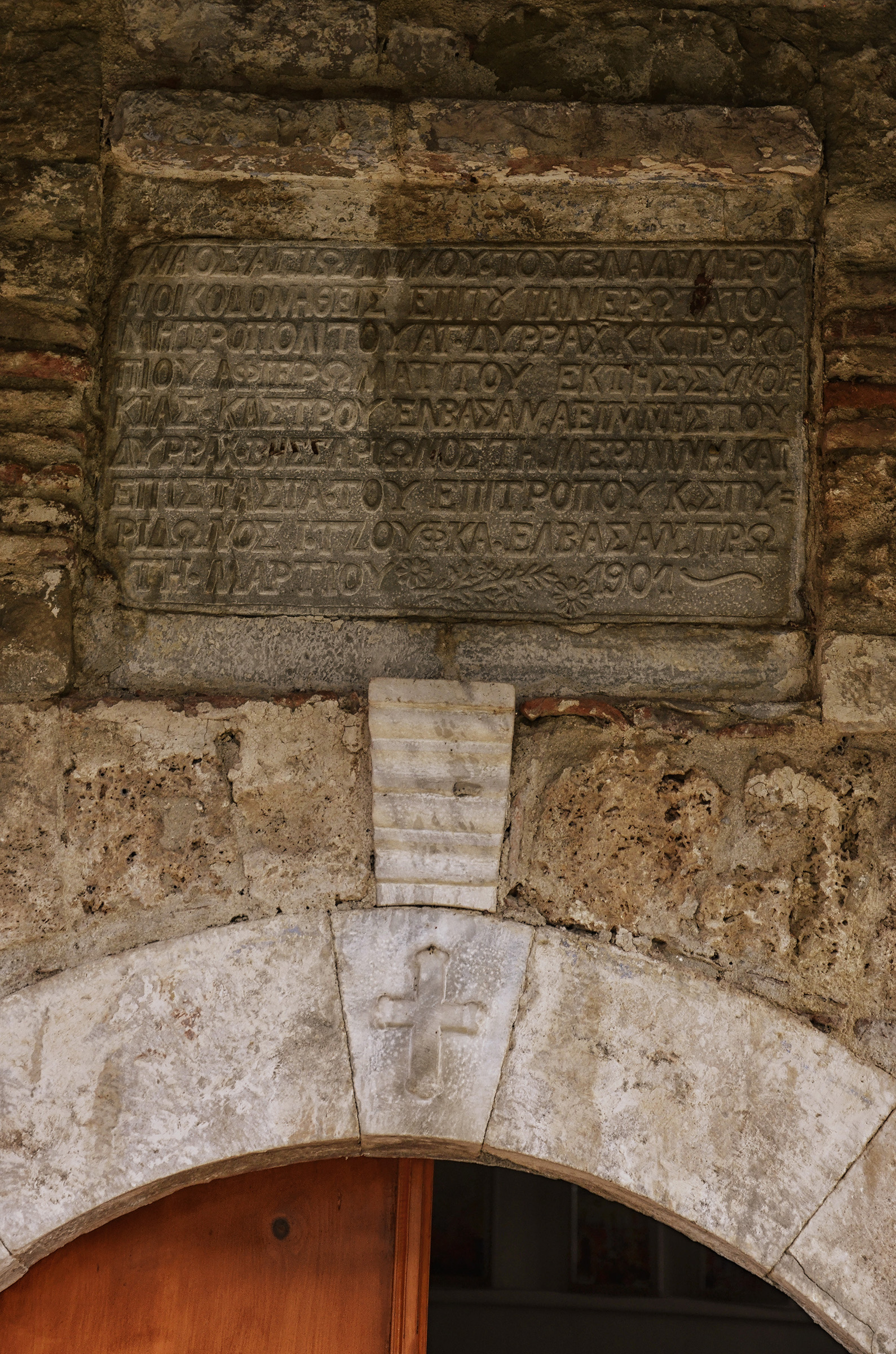
Stone engraving above the entrance

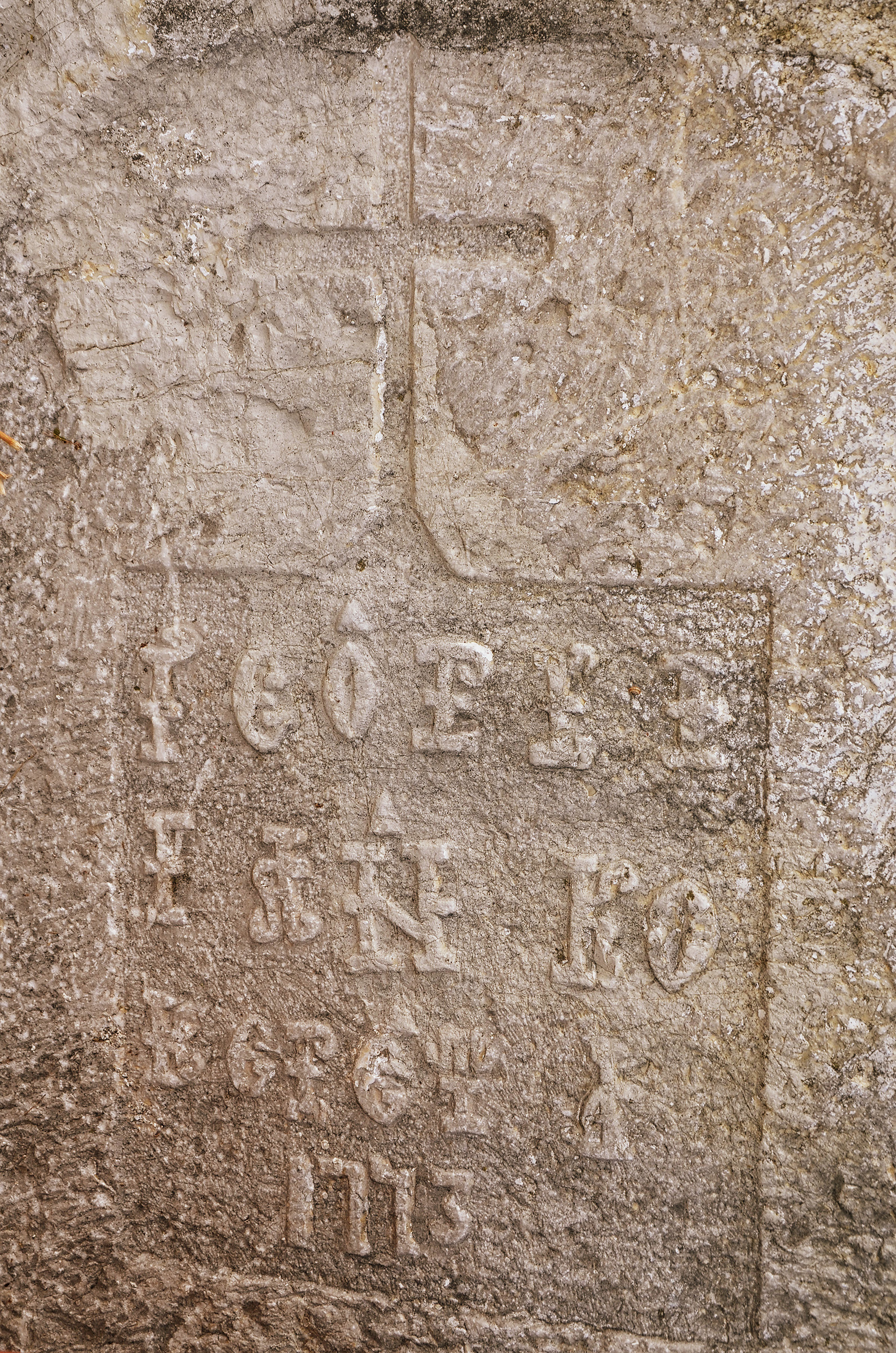
Engraving on the church wall

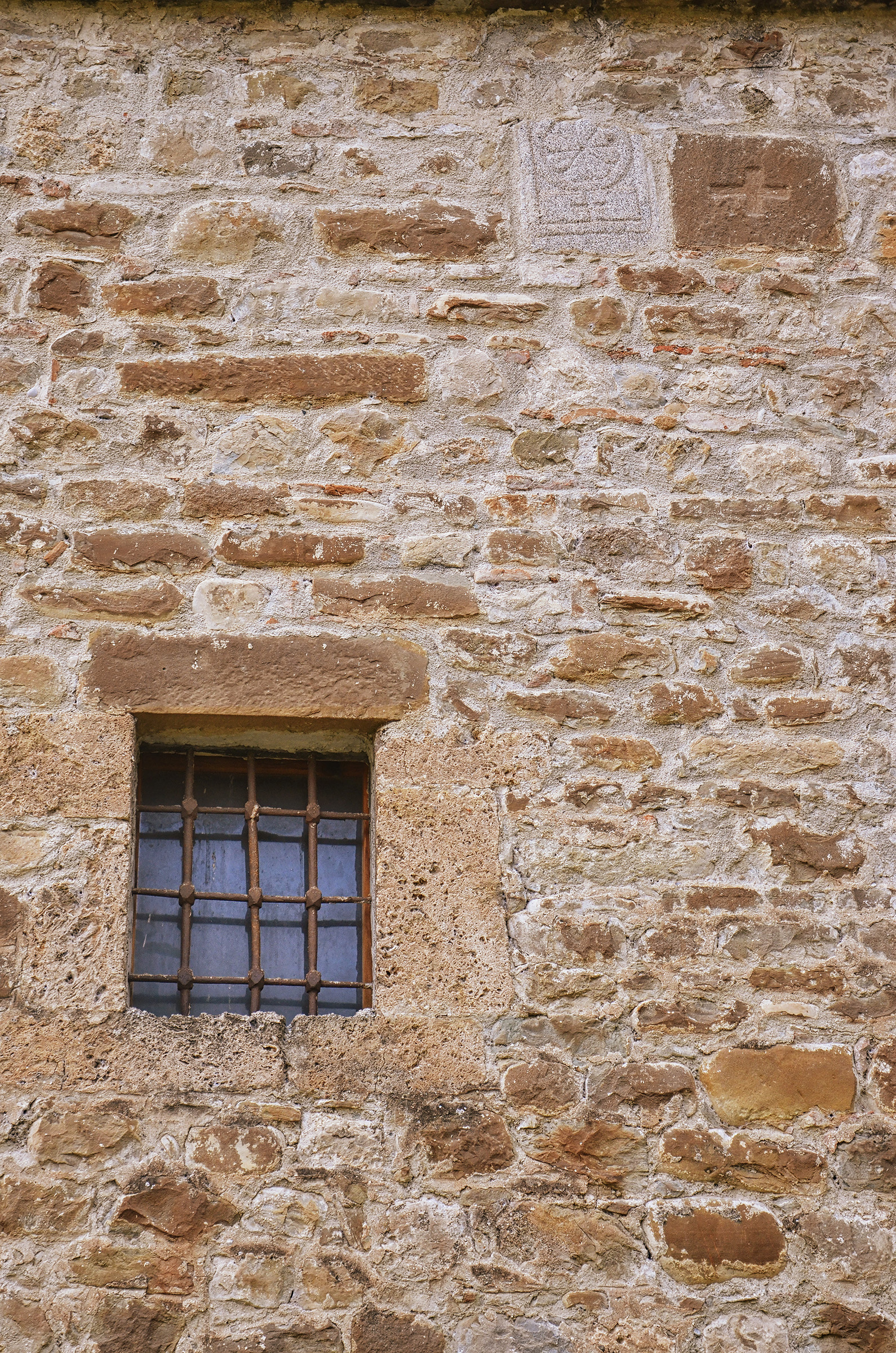

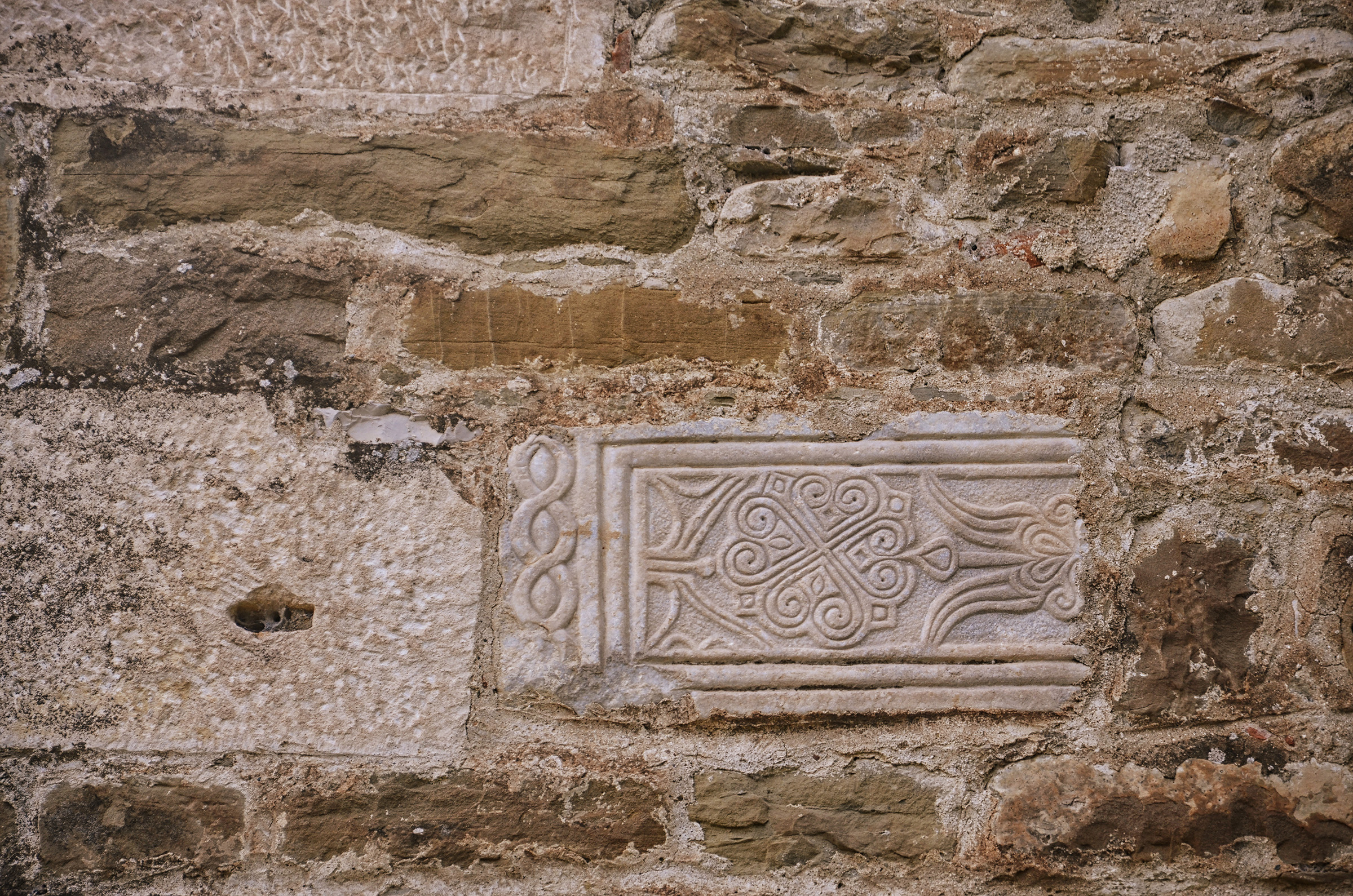

== See also ==
- Thopia family
- Principality of Albania (medieval)
