= Ad Quintum =

Ancient settlement in Albania

Coordinates: 41.09411°N 20.01487°E

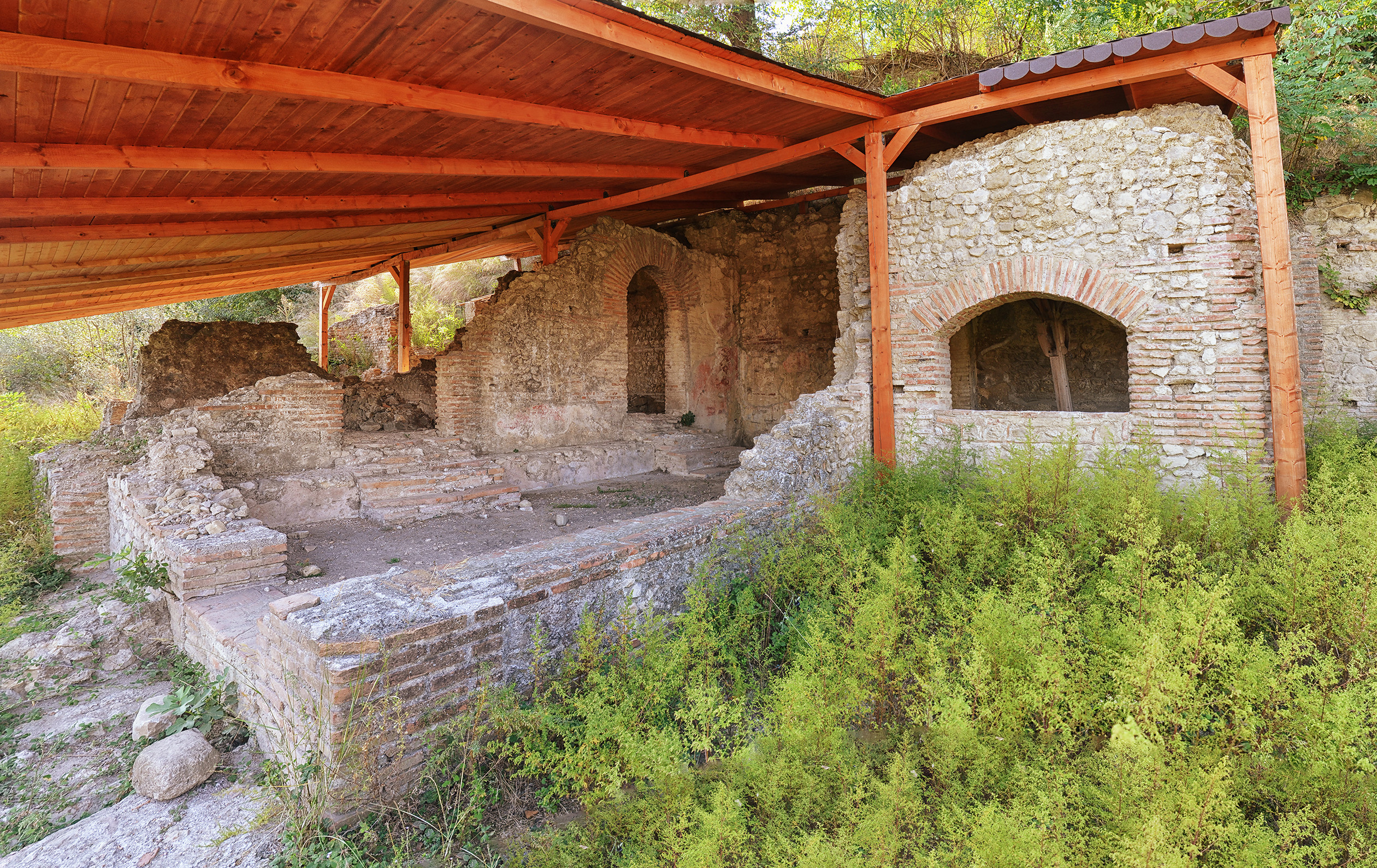
The ancient Roman Thermae of Ad Quintum.

Ad Quintum (Albanian: Stacioni Romak) was an ancient settlement and a Roman thermal complex in Illyricum, near Bradashesh, present-day Albania. Ad Quintum was a mutatio ("changing station" or "way station") of the Via Egnatia, which connected western Illyria with eastern Thrace, from the two starting points of Dyrrhachium and Apollonia, to Byzantium. The two branches of the first part of the Via Egnatia converged at Ad Quintum, then the road continued eastwards through the valley of the Shkumbin.

== Description ==
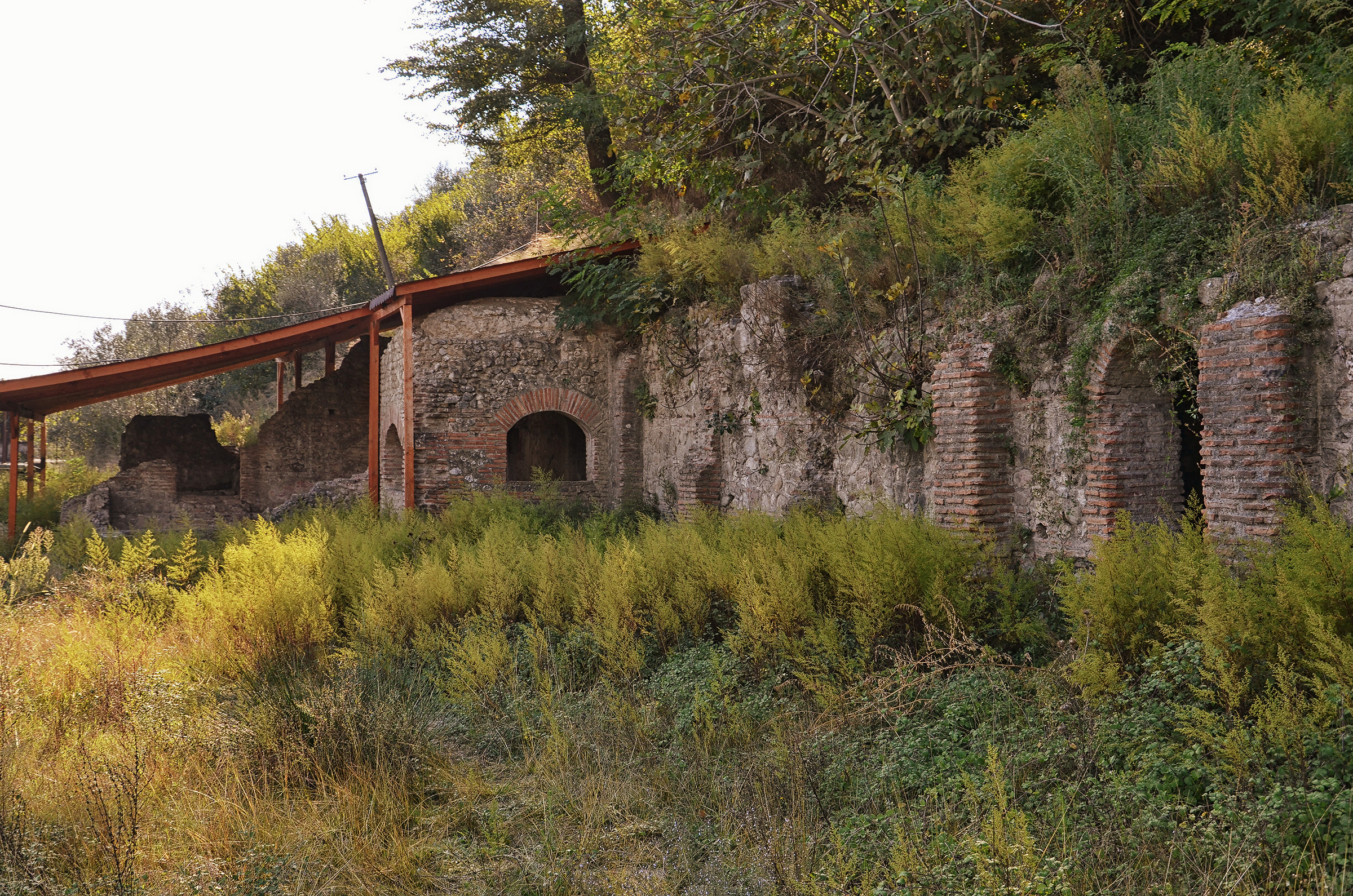
Thermal complex.

Ad Quintum was located on the Via Egnatia connecting Dyrrhachium and Apollonia with Byzantium. The Via Egnatia started with two branches, the northern one from Dyrrhachium, and the southern one from Apollonia. The two branches converged at Ad Quintum, continuing eastwards through the valley of the Shkumbin.

The thermal complex was built in the middle of the 2nd century AD, and continued to be populated until the 4th century AD. It was abandoned perhaps due to the civic development of nearby Scampa or to the reduced use of the road station. Its well preserved ruins can be seen near the present-day village Bradashesh, right next to the SH7 road.

Compared with other contemporary thermal structures, its surface is rather modest: 41.5 × 11 m^{2}. However, the architectural spaces are well structured, including a large Nymphaeum, the frigidarium, the apodyterium, the tepidarium, the calidarium, the laconicum and the praefurnum. The bathhouse consists of five main rooms. At the eastern end there is an apsed exedra that was used as a dining room. This connects to the small rectangular cold plunge-bath. The apodyterium (undressing room) also survived with fine paintings and frescoes on its walls. Further to the western end of the building the ruins of the laconicum (heated sweating room) can be seen with the traces of the hypocaust (underfloor heating), along with the adjacent praefernium (furnace).

The site was extensively excavated around 1968 which uncovered a fine Roman villa and a remarkably well-preserved thermae (bathhouse) taking advantage of the abundant springs nearby.

== Gallery ==
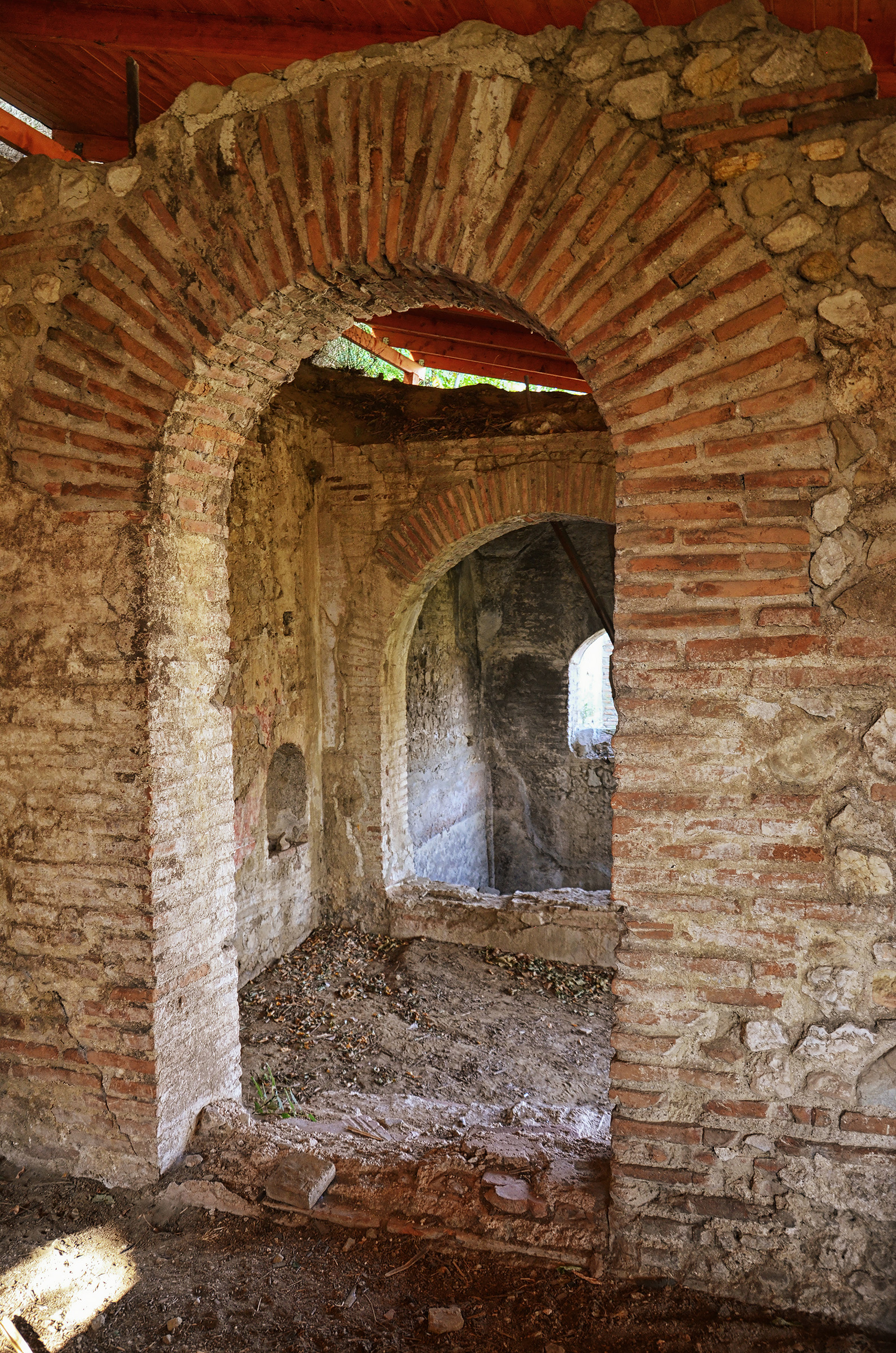
Entrance of the frigidarium

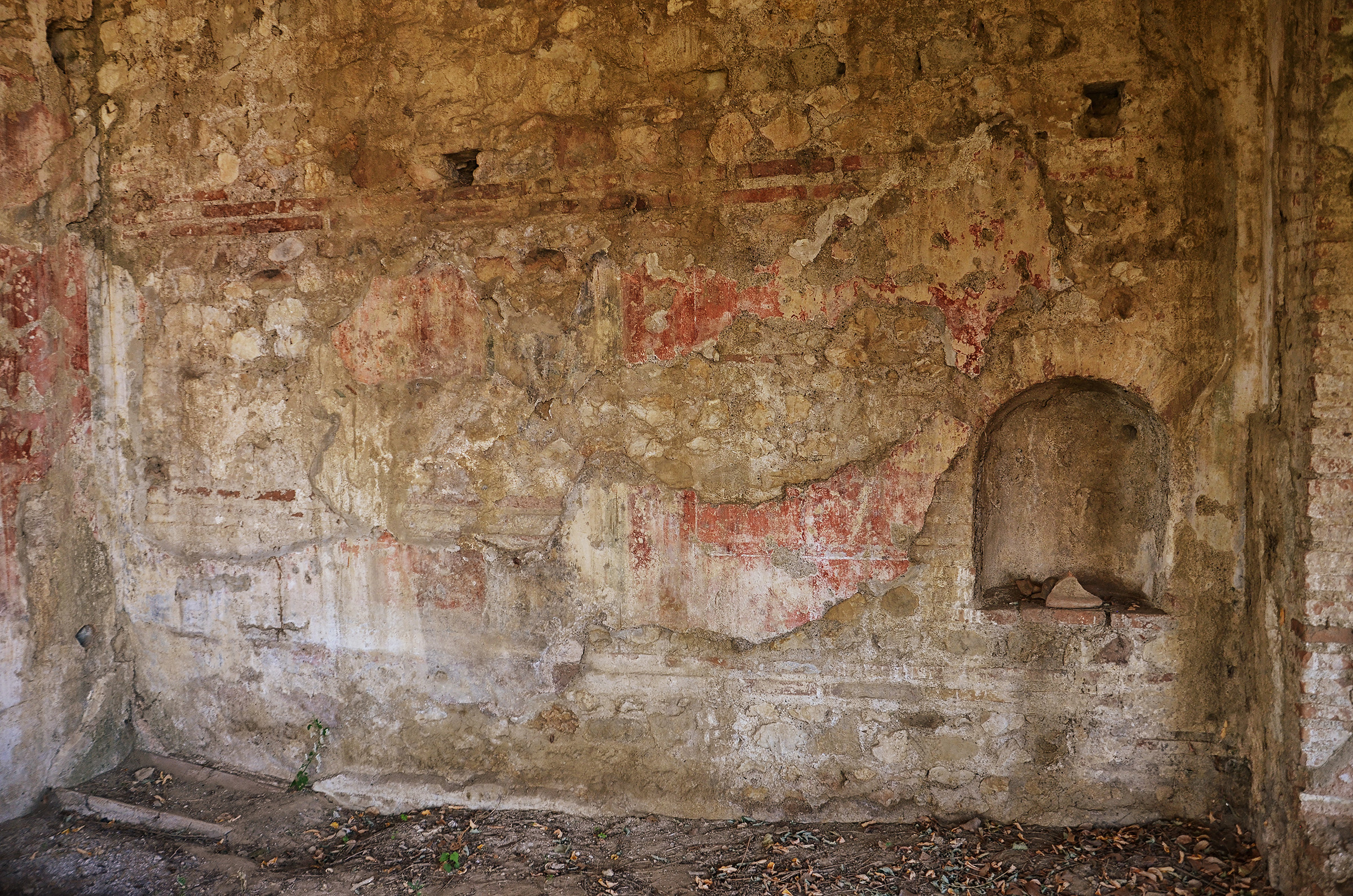
Rear wall of the apodyterium

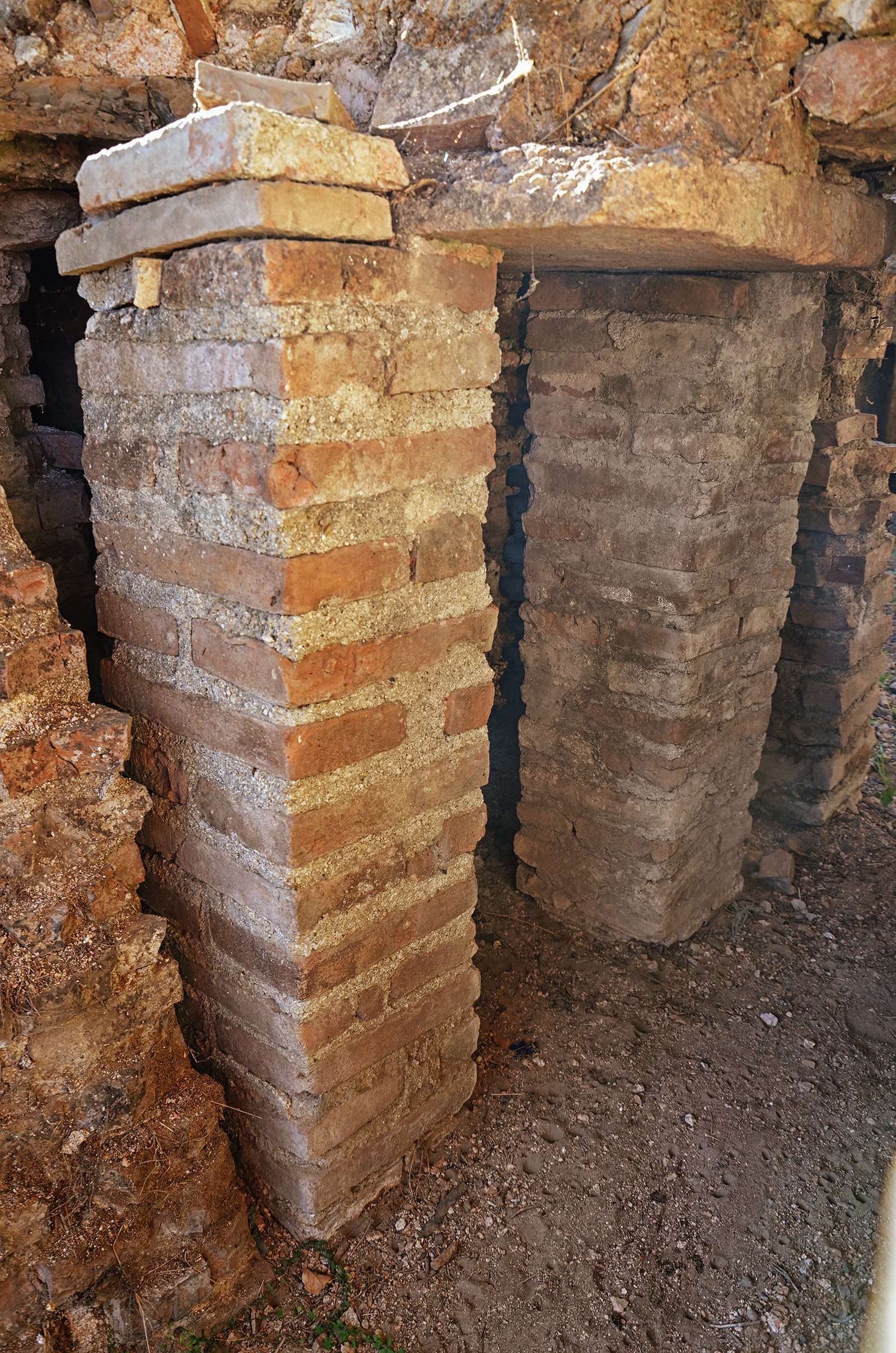
Hypocaust

== See also ==
- List of settlements in Illyria

== Bibliography ==
- de Matteis, Mario (2017). "Stazioni di sosta (mutationes) lungo la via Egnazia". Palaver. 6 (2): 7–28. doi:10.1285/i22804250v6i2p7. ISSN 2280-4250.
- Gilkes, Oliver (2013). Albania: An Archaeological Guide. London; New York: I. B. Tauris. pp. 90–92. ISBN 9781780760698.
- Stocker, Sharon R. (2009). Illyrian Apollonia: Toward a New Ktisis and Developmental History of the Colony.
