= Theodore Kavalliotis =

Greek Orthodox priest and teacher during the Greek Enlightenment

- Born: 1718; Moscopole, Ottoman Empire (modern Albania) or Kavala, Ottoman Empire (modern Greece)
- Died: 1789 (aged 70–71); Moscopole, Ottoman Empire (modern Albania)
- Occupation(s): Schoolmaster at the New Academy (Moscopole), Philosopher, Priest

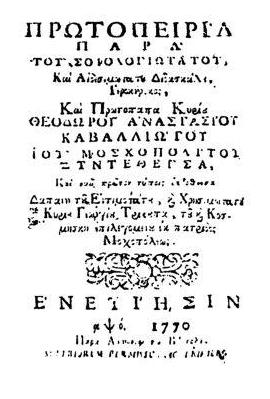
Cover of 'Protopeiria', printed in Venice, 1770.

Theodore Anastasios Kavalliotis (Greek: Θεόδωρος Αναστασίου Καβαλλιώτης; Aromanian: Teodor Anastasie Cavalioti; Albanian: Theodor Kavalioti, 1718 – 11 August 1789) was a Greek Orthodox priest, teacher and a figure of the Greek Enlightenment. He is also known for having drafted an Aromanian–Greek–Albanian dictionary.

== Early life ==
Theodoros Anastasiou Kavalliotis was born in Kavala or Moscopole, where he spent most of his life. He has been described variously as either Aromanian, Albanian or Greek. Regardless, Kavalliotis had a Greek identity. He studied in Moscopole and later pursued higher studies in mathematical and philosophical sciences, at the Maroutseios college in Ioannina (in 1732-1734), directed by Eugenios Voulgaris.

== Working period ==
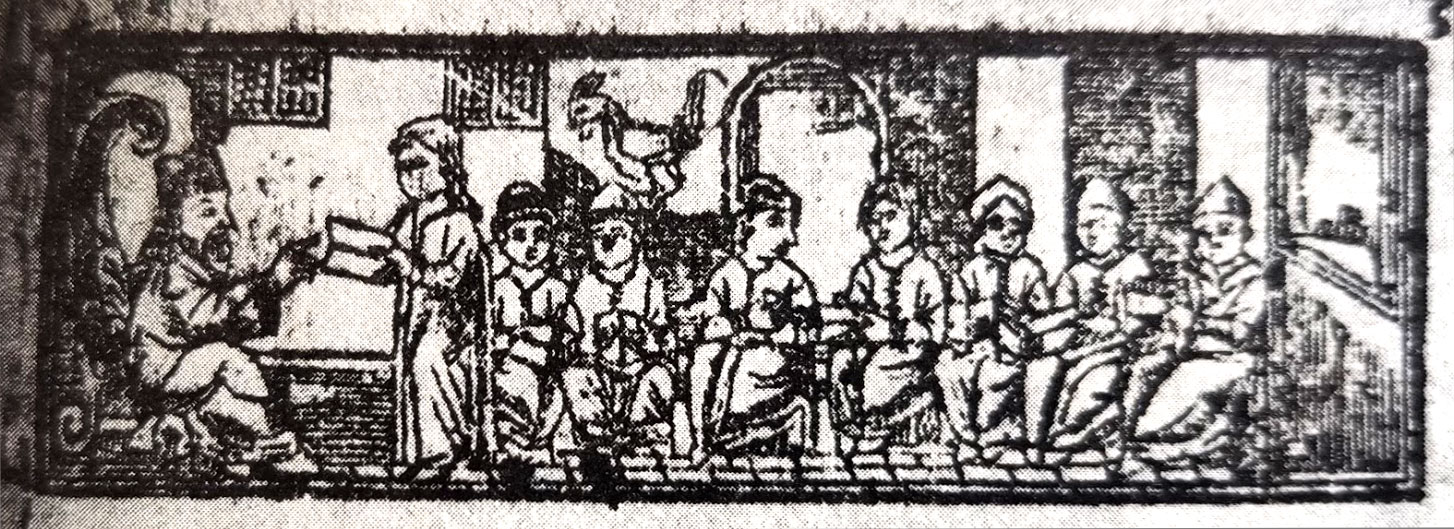
A scene from a class in the New Academy of Moscopole, published in 1750 on the cover of Theodore Kavalliotis' book. The teacher on the left could be Kavalliotis himself. Engraving by Theodor Gruntovic or Gregory of Durrës.

He returned to Moscopole and was appointed teacher at the New Academy (Greek: Νέα Ακαδημία, romanized: Nea Akadimia) in 1743. In 1750, he succeeded his former teacher Sevastos Leontiadis and became director of the New Academy for more than 20 years (1748–1769). His works, written in Greek, are: Logic (1749, unpublished), Physics (1752, unpublished), Grammar of modern Greek (1760), Metaphysics (1767), Protopeiria (1770). They were used extensively and hand-made copies were found even as far as Iaşi, Romania. After the destruction of Moscopole in 1769, he probably went to Tokaj, Hungary, but returned in 1773.

In 1770, he published in Venice, at Antonio Bortoli's printing press, a school textbook, called Protopeiria. Protopeiria is a 104 pages textbook, which in pages 15–59 included a trilingual lexicon of 1,170 Greek, Aromanian and Albanian words. This work aimed at the Hellenization of the non-Greek-speaking Christian communities in the Balkans. The lexicon was re-published in 1774 by the Swedish professor Johann Thunmann, who taught at the University of Halle-Wittenberg. Thunmann added a Latin translation to the words in Greek, Aromanian and Albanian.

Besides Eugenios Voulgaris, he was also influenced by the work of Vikentios Damodos, Methodios Anthrakites, René Descartes and medieval scholastics.

Kavalliotis couldn't manage to reestablish the destroyed New Academy. During his last months he witnessed another wave of destruction of his home place, in June 1789, by local Muslim lords. Kavalliotis died at August 11, 1789, aged 71.

== Sample from the first page of the Lexicon ==
Ῥωμαίϊκα (Romaic - modern Greek)	Βλάχικα (Vlach - Aromanian)	Ἀλβανίτικα (Albanian)	English translation	(Daco-)Romanian translation
Ἀββᾶς	Ηγούμενου (Igumenu)	Ηγκουμέν (Igumen)	Abbot	Egumen, abate, stareț
Ἀγαλια	Ανάργα (Anarga)	Γκαντάλε (Ngadalë)	Slowly	Încet, lent
Ἀγαπῶ	Βόη (Voe)	Ντούα (Dua)	(I) Love	Iubesc, îndrăgesc
Ἄγγελος	Άγγελου (Aghelu)	Έγγελ (Engjëll)	Angel	Înger
Ἀγγεῖον	Βάσου (Vasu)	Ένᾳ (Enë)	Pot	Vas, cratiță
Ἀγγίσρι	Γκρέπου (Grepu)	Γκρέπ (Grep)	Fish hook	Cârlig
Ἀγελάδα	Βάκᾳ (Vaca)	Λιόπᾳ (Lopë)	Cow	Vacă
Ἅγιος	Σᾴμτου (Santu)	Σσιέντ (Shenjt)	Saint	S(f)ânt
Ἀγκάθι	Σκίνου (Schinu)	Γκιέπ (Gjemb)	Thorn	Ghimpe
Ἀγκάλη	Μπράτζᾳ (Mbrata)	Πουσστίμ (Pushtim)	Embrace	Îmbrățișare
Ἀγκοῦρι	Καϛραβέτζου (Castravetsu)	Κραϛαβέτζ (Kastravec)	Cucumber	Castravete
Ἀγκῶνας	Κότου (Cotu)	Μπᾳλλίουλ (Bërryl)	Elbow	Cot
Ἀγνάντια	Καρσσί (Carsi)	Κουντρέ (Kundër)	Opposite	Opus, diferit

== Works ==
- Εἰσαγωγὴ εἰς τὰ ὀκτω μέρη τοῦ λόγου. Ἐν Μοσχοπόλει 1760 καὶ Ἑνετίῃσι 1774.
- Ἔπη πρὸς τὸν ἐξαρχικῶν ἐν Μοσχοπόλει ἐπιδημήσαντα Ἰωαννίκιον Χαλκηδόνος ἐν ἔτει 1750 Μαΐου 2.
- Πρωτοπειρία. (Starting out) Ἑνετίῃσιν, 1770. Παρὰ Ἀντωνίῳ τῷ Βόρτολι. Superiorum permissu. Ac privilegio.

== Sources ==
- Hetzer, Armin; Roman, Viorel S. (February 1983), Albania, Walter De Gruyter Inc, ISBN 978-3-598-21133-1
- Κεκριδής Ευστάθιος (1989), "Θεόδωρος Αναστασίου Καβαλλιώτης (1718; 1789). Ο Διδάσκαλος του Γένους", Aristotle University of Thessaloniki (Doctoral Dissertation), doi:10.12681/eadd/1624, hdl:10442/hedi/1624
- Lloshi, Xhevat (2008), Rreth Alfabetit te Shqipes, Logos, ISBN 9789989582684
