= John of Debar =

11th-century Bulgarian clergyman

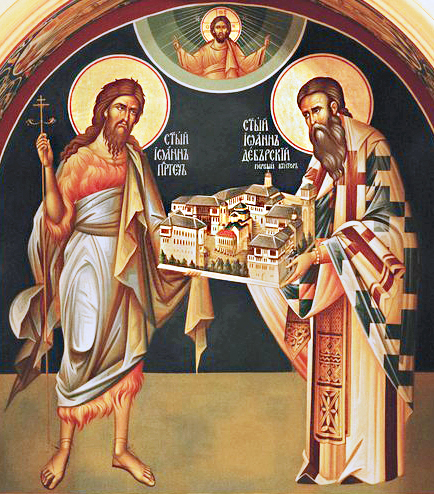
John of Debar as Ktitor (founder) of the monastery of Sveti Jovan Bigorski near Debar in today's North Macedonia.

John of Debar (Bulgarian: Йоан Дебърски; fl. 1018–1037) was an 11th-century Bulgarian clergyman. He was a bishop under Emperor Samuel of Bulgaria. According to Srđan Pirivatrić he became the last Bulgarian patriarch David in 1016. He remained in office, becoming the first Archbishop of Ohrid, after the fall of the First Bulgarian Empire to Byzantium. When in 1018 Emperor Basil II managed to conquer Bulgaria, he issued a decree to downgrade the Patriarchate of the Bulgarian Orthodox Church to the Archbishopric of Ohrid, which remained autocephalous and corresponded to the newly formed theme of Bulgaria. John was chosen to be the first Archbishop of Ohrid by Basil II. According to 17th-century French historian Charles du Fresne, John was born in a village around the town of Debar in modern North Macedonia and had been a hegumen in a Debar monastery. Per Bulgarian historian Ivan Snegarov, he was born in the village Agnoandnika in the region of Debar. He remained head of the Archbishopric until his death in 1037.

John of Debar is canonized as a saint by the Bulgarian Orthodox Church as Saint David of Bulgaria and is commemorated on June 26.
