= Elbasan (Unicode block) =

- Range: U+10500..U+1052F (48 code points)
- Plane: SMP
- Scripts: Elbasan
- Assigned: 40 code points
- Unused: 8 reserved code points

Unicode version history
- 7.0 (2014): 40 (+40)

Unicode documentation
- Code chart ∣ Web page

Elbasan is a Unicode block containing the historic Elbasan characters for writing the Albanian language.

Elbasan^{[1]}^{[2]} Official Unicode Consortium code chart (PDF)
	0	1	2	3	4	5	6	7	8	9	A	B	C	D	E	F
U+1050x	𐔀	𐔁	𐔂	𐔃	𐔄	𐔅	𐔆	𐔇	𐔈	𐔉	𐔊	𐔋	𐔌	𐔍	𐔎	𐔏
U+1051x	𐔐	𐔑	𐔒	𐔓	𐔔	𐔕	𐔖	𐔗	𐔘	𐔙	𐔚	𐔛	𐔜	𐔝	𐔞	𐔟
U+1052x	𐔠	𐔡	𐔢	𐔣	𐔤	𐔥	𐔦	𐔧								
Notes: 1. As of Unicode version 16.0; 2. Grey areas indicate non-assigned code points

== History ==
The following Unicode-related documents record the purpose and process of defining specific characters in the Elbasan block:

Version	Final code points (Note: Proposed code points and characters names may differ from final code points and names)	Count	L2 ID	WG2 ID	Document
7.0	U+10500..10527	40	L2/09-328		Anderson, Deborah; Glavy, Jason (2009-11-30), Old Albanian Scripts
7.0	U+10500..10527	40	L2/10-216	N3856	Everson, Michael; Elsie, Robert (2010-06-23), Preliminary proposal for encoding the Elbasan script in the SMP of the UCS
7.0	U+10500..10527	40	L2/11-050	N3985	Everson, Michael (2011-02-03), Proposal for encoding the Elbasan script in the SMP of the UCS
7.0	U+10500..10527	40	L2/11-016		Moore, Lisa (2011-02-15), "C.7", UTC #126 / L2 #223 Minutes
7.0	U+10500..10527	40		N4103	"11.2.9 Elbasan script", Unconfirmed minutes of WG 2 meeting 58, 2012-01-03
