= Sevastos Leontiadis =

Greek educationist (1690–1765)

Sevastos Leontiadis (Greek: Σεβαστός Λεοντιάδης) was an ethnic Greek educationist from the Ottoman Empire who was most known as the director of the Kastoria school between 1726 and 1728.

He was born in Kastoria in 1690. He was student of Methodios Anthrakites in Siatista, Kastoria and Ioannina. He spent some time in Italy for studies. He was the director of the Kastoria school (1726–1728) and later taught in Kozani (1728–1733) and finally at the New Academy of Moschopolis. He died in 1765.

== See also ==
- List of Macedonians (Greek)
