= New Academy (Moscopole) =

- Νέα Ἀκαδημία, Ελληνικό Φροντιστήριο
- Moscopole; Ottoman Empire

Information
- Type: Academy
- Established: 1744
- Status: destroyed
- Closed: 1769
- Headmaster: 1744-1750 Sevastos Leontiadis; 1750-1769 Theodore Kavalliotis
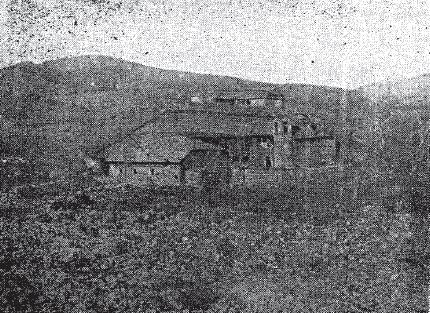
- Early 20th-century picture of the now destroyed church of Saint John in Moscopole. The New Academy was built on the foreground.

The New Academy or Greek Academy (Greek: Νέα Ἀκαδημία, Ελληνικό Φροντιστήριο) was a renowned educational institution, operating from 1743 to 1769 in Moscopole, an 18th-century cultural and commercial metropolis of the Aromanians and leading center of Greek culture in what is now southern Albania. It was nicknamed the "worthiest jewel of the city" and played a very active role in the inception of the modern Greek Enlightenment movement.

== Background ==
Moscopole, currently a small village in southern Albania, used to be an 18th-century city, inhabited then and now predominantly by Aromanians. It became a center of Greek culture, with Greek being the language of education in the local schools, as well as the language of the books published by the local printing house, founded either in 1720 or in 1731. It was the second Greek printing press founded in the Ottoman Empire, after a printing press in Istanbul from 1627. Education was so actively promoted, that the city emerged as a leading center of Greek intellectual activity.

An educational institution, called The Greek College, was active in the city as early as 1700. Its first director, Chrysanthos, was a monk from Zitsa, while, in 1724, Ioannina born scholar, Nicolaos Stigmis, became schoolmaster. After 1730 and for a short period, Ioannis Chalkeus an Aristotelian philosopher also taught in the school. During that time the teaching staff included scholars from various ethnic backgrounds: Aromanian, Greek and Albanian.

== History ==
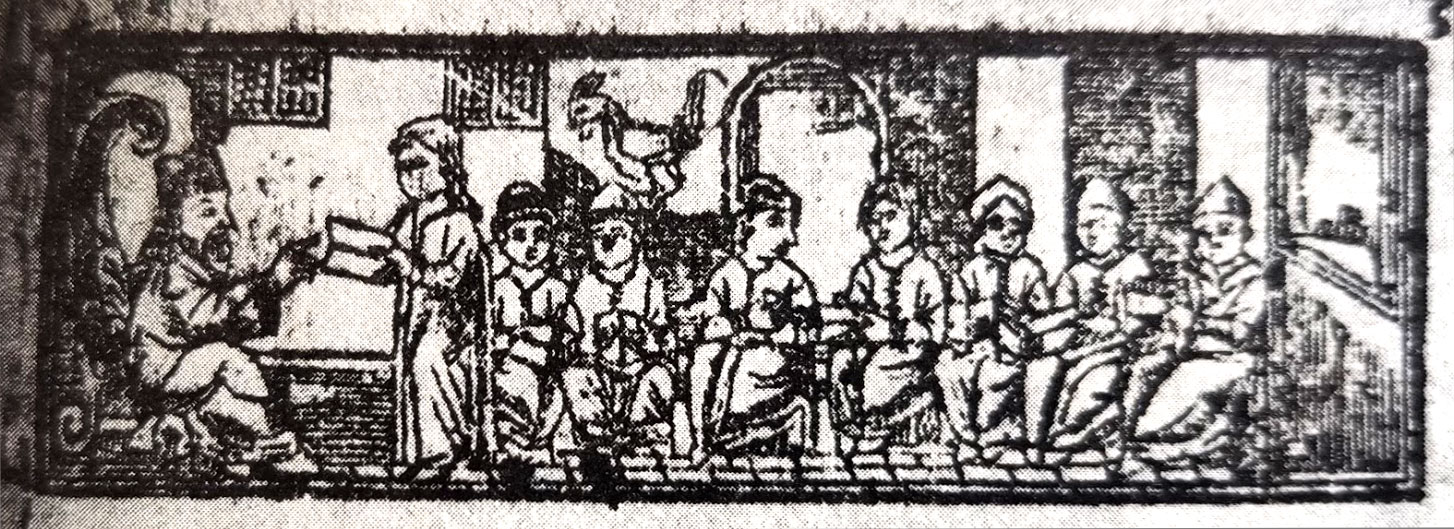
A scene from a class in the New Academy of Moscopole, published in 1750 on the cover of Theodor Kavalioti's book. The teacher on the left could be Kavalioti himself. Engraving by Theodor Gruntovic or Gregory of Durrës.

In 1738, Sevastos Leontiadis, a scholar and priest from Kastoria (now Greece), was put in charge. It was during his directorate that the school was upgraded and endowed with additional classes. In 1744 the school was named New Academy and in 1750 it was re-housed in a new, imposing building. In accordance to 18th-century Greek educational mores, a school could only acquire the title 'Academy' if it achieved a higher standard of educational quality and prestige. Similar educational institutions this period were operating in a number of urban center in the Ottoman Empire: Bucharest, Iași, Ioannina, Istanbul (Constantinople).

It was also alternatively called Ellinikon Frontistirion (Greek: Ελληνικόν Φροντιστήριον Greek College). In 1750 Theodore Kavalliotis, already a member of the teaching staff since 1743, became the headmaster of the New Academy. Kavalliotis was instrumental in establishing the reputation of the Academy, which, under his direction, reached its floruit. Becoming the virtual soul of the Academy, Kavalliotis taught grammar, poetry, philosophical disciplines, and theology. Moreover, with the purpose of meeting class needs, he wrote a number of introductory manuals in Greek, as well as treatises and other material, necessary for teaching, many of which are still preserved in unpublished manuscripts.

Apart from Kavalliotis, another teacher of the New Academy was the owner of the Academy's printing press, Georgios Konstantinidis known as well as Gregory of Durrës, although Robert Elsie believes they are two different people. Gregory was also responsible for the printing of the books that were taught at the school. He taught from 1745 to 1748. The printing house had notably close ties to the Monastery of Saint Naum, near Ohrid. Notably 19 publications from Moscopole's printing press, mainly religious ones, appeared until 1760. The last known publication of the press was the Introduction to Grammar by Kavalliotis.

== Aftermath ==
The New Academy, was destroyed during the first wave of destruction of Moscopole, by Muslim Albanian bands in 1769. Although the city never rose to its former glory, a new Greek school was established at the end of the 18th century whose headmaster at 1802 was Daniel Moscopolites. This school functioned the following decades, thanks to donations and bequests mainly by baron Simon Sinas, a member of the Moscopolean diaspora. The school functioned until the 1916 wave of destruction, and its last director was Theophrastos Georgiadis.

== Notable alumni ==
- Daniel Moscopolites
- Konstantinos Tzechanis
- Theodhor Haxhifilipi

== Sources ==
- Bardu, Nistor (2007), "Eighteenth Century Aromanian Writers: the Enlightenment and the Awakening of National and Balkan Consciousness" (PDF), Philologica Jassyensia, archived from the original (PDF) on 2011-08-18
- Kekridis Eustathios (1989), Θεόδωρος Αναστασίου Καβαλλιώτης (1718; 1789). Ο Διδάσκαλος του Γένους, Aristotle University of Thessaloniki (in Greek and English), doi:10.12681/eadd/1624, hdl:10442/hedi/1624
- Lloshi, Xhevat (2008), Rreth Alfabetit te shqipes [Around the Albanian Alphabet)] (in Albanian), Logos, ISBN 978-9989-58-268-4
- Peyfuss, Max Demeter (1976), "Die Akademie von Moschopolis und ihre Nachwirkungen im Geistesleben Sudosteuropas", Wissenschaftspolitik im Mittel- und Osteuropa: Wissenschaftliche Gesellschaften, Akademien und Hochschulen im 18. und beginnenden 19. Jahrhundert (in German), Hobbing, pp. 114–128, ISBN 978-3-921515-00-6
- Sakellariou, M. V. (1997). Epirus, 4000 years of Greek history and civilization. Ekdotikē Athēnōn. ISBN 978-960-213-371-2.
