= Polis, Albania =

Polis
- Administrative unit
- Location within Albania
- Coordinates: 41°9′N 20°14′E
- Country: Albania
- County: Elbasan
- Municipality: Librazhd

Population (2011)
  - Administrative unit: 3,385
- Time zone: UTC+1 (CET)
  - Summer (DST): UTC+2 (CEST)

Polis is a village and a former municipality in the Elbasan County, eastern Albania. At the 2015 local government reform it became a subdivision of the municipality Librazhd. It has an area of approximately 100km^2. The population at the 2011 census was 3,385, with all residents being Albanian. The name of the village comes from the Greek word for city, the name may have been retained from ancient times when Greeks would trade in Illyria, hence the name never changed. This shows the now village of Polis may have been a larger settlement in ancient times.
