= Johann Erich Thunmann =

Swedish linguist and historian

- Born: 23 August 1746; Thoresund, Södermanland, Sweden
- Died: 17 December 1778 (aged 32)
- Other names: Johannes Erich Thunmann
- Occupations: linguist, historian and theologian

Johann Erich Thunmann or Johannes or Hans (23 August 1746 — 17 December 1778) was a linguist, historian and theologian born in Thoresund (Södermanland) in Sweden. He studied at Strängnäs and Uppsala then left Sweden to study at Greifswald. Thunmann was professor of philosophy at the University of Halle.

== "Eastern Europeans" ==
Thunmann made extensive study of the peoples of Eastern Europe. He was the first author to use the term "Eastern Europeans" in a book title, in his Untersuchungen über die Geschichte der östlichen europäischen Völker, 1774. Thunmann's work served as a liberal agenda for nations without nation states. Thunmann was one of the scientists who did not believe that Bulgarians are Slavs, or at least not "pure Slavs". He believed that Vlachs are descendants of old Thracian and Dacian tribes or Getic people. In 1825, based also on Thunmann's works, Mikhail Pogodin wrote his thesis "On the origins of the Rus'" which supports the Normanist theory of Russian origins.

=== Albanians ===
Thunmann was one of the most important early authors writing about the language and origin of Albanians. The first serious attempts to present scientific explanation of the origin of Albanians began with Thunmann. He believed that in terms of history and language, the Albanians and the Aromanians were the least known European peoples in Western Europe.

Thunmann was the first scholar to disseminate the theory about the autochthonous Albanians and to present the Illyrian theory of the origin of Albanians. Thunmann researched the origin of the term "Skipatar", the term Albanians use as their ethnic name. In 1774 Thunmann republished a three-language (Albanian, Greek and Aromanian) lexicon Theodor Kavalioti first published in 1770, and later added a Latin translation. Thunmann believed in Illyro-Thracian unity.

== Bibliography ==
Thunmann's notable works include:

- Ab Augustissimo Prussorum Rege Friderico II, et maximo domino suo clementissimo, iniunctum professoris eloquentiae et philosophiae in Academia Fridericiana munus aditurus quaedam de confiniis historicae et poeticae orationis disputauit simul vero scholarum suarum rationem. Ex officina Hendeliana. 1772.
- De confiniis historicae et poeticae orationis disputavit simul vero scholarum suarum rationem exposuit. 1772.
- Untersuchungen über die alte Geschichte einiger Nordischen Völker. Mit einer Vorrede herausgegeben von D. Anton Friedrich Bösching. Im Verlag Der Buchhdlg. D. Realschule. 1772.
- Untersuchungen über die Geschichte der östlichen Europäischen Völker. Leipzig. 1774.
- Über die Geschichte und Sprache der Albaner und der Wlachen. Hamburg: Buske. 1976. ISBN 978-3-87118-217-4. - reprint
