= Injac Zamputi =

Albanian scholar, writer, and historian (1910 – 1998)

- Born: February 12, 1910; Shkodër, Ottoman Empire (now Albania)
- Died: February 28, 1998 (aged 88); Tivoli, Lazio, Italy
- Resting place: Sharrë, Vaqarr, Albania
- Other name: Ignazio Zamputti
- Education: Shkodër Jesuit College; University of Trieste
- Occupations: Scholar, writer, historian

Injac Zamputi (Italian: Ignazio Zamputti; Shkodra, 12 February 1910 – 28 February 1998) was an Albanian scholar, writer, and historian.

== Early life ==
Zamputi was born on 12 February 1910 in Shkodër, today's Albania, back then still part of the Vilayet of Scutari of the Ottoman Empire. His paternal grandfather was Italian (Zamputti) who had initially settled in Kavajë in 1870, while his wife (Zamputi's paternal grandfather) was a Ragusian-born migrated to Albania (Račić). His father was born in Durrës in 1876, while his mother was an Albanian woman from Temal of Dukagjin highlands. Zamputi graduated from the Saverian College in Shkodra, and at the age of 21, and where he would start his academic career as professor of the Albanian language and literature. He would later study political sciences at the University of Trieste in Italy.

== Academic life ==
In 1937, he wrote a melodrama titled Damiani Himarjot (Damian of Himara), published in the Leka magazine later in 1943. In 1943, he published his first book Zemra Njerëzish (People hearts) and in 1944 his second book, a collection of short stories titled Atje nën hijen e Rozafës (There, by the Rozafa Shade). After the Italian invasion of Albania he was the editor of Italian language part of the "Fascist Youth" journal (Rinija Fashiste). Right after the end of WWII, he started as director of the Cultural Center in Shkodra, while during 1946–1948 he lived in Gjirokastër, teaching literature in the local lyceum. He would continue to write during the '50s and '60s, three dramas, a melodrama, two long stories, and a poem about the Albanian uprising of 1481 which would not get published, forcing him to focus on history and paleography. He started working in the Medieval History section of the Institute of Sciences (later known as Institute of History, Alb: Instituti i Historisë, where he would work for circa 40 years. In 1953, he settled in Tirana. Zamputi gave an immense contribute in transcribing, translating, and commenting thousands of important documents about the history of Albania, taking advantage of his excellent knowledge of Latin, medieval Italian, paleography, and archival research. During his academic life, Zamputi distinguished himself as an historian of unusual precision and reliability. Some of his main works are Relacione mbi gjendjen a Shqiperise veriore e te mesme ne shkullin XVII (Reports on the state of Northern and Central Albania in the 17th century), Dokumenta te shekullit XV per historine e Shqiperise (15th century documents on the Albanian history), Regjistrimi i kadastres dhe koncencioneve ne rrethin e Shkodres, 1417–1418 (Land and concessions registry in the Shkodra district, 1417–1418), and a set of volumes Dokumente per historine e Shqiperise (Documents on the history of Albania), by periods: 1479–1506, 1400–1405, 1507–1699 (the later in 4 volumes named Dokumente the shekujve 16-17 per historine e Shqiperise – Documents from the 16th-17th centuries on the history of Albania). Zamputi is also known for transcribing the Elbasan Gospel Manuscript.

In 1993 he moved to Italy, where he kept working on the medieval history, finishing two manuscripts of translated medieval documents, and an autobiography. He died in Tivoli, on 28 February 1998, and was buried in Sharrë near Tirana on 5 March 1998.

== Recognition ==
Despite his huge contribute in the fields of history and albanology, the first scientific title was awarded to him in 1995 as "Punonjës i shquar i shkencës dhe i teknikës" (Distinguished contributor on science and technology), for "distinguished contribute on Albanological Sciences".

== See also ==
- Pjeter Marubi
- Studime Historike
- Albanology
- Medieval Albania
