= Ivan Snegarov =

Bulgarian historian and activist (1883-1971)

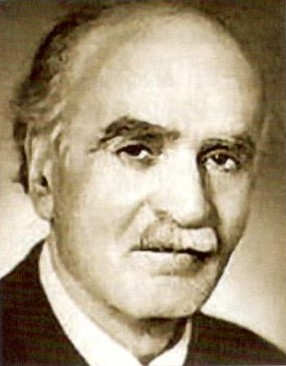
Ivan Snegarov

Ivan Yonchev Snegarov (Bulgarian: Иван Йончев Снегаров; October 12, 1883, Ohrid, Ottoman Empire — March 1, 1971, Sofia) was a Bulgarian historian and archivist.

== Biography ==
Snegrov was born on October 12, 1883, in the city of Ohrid, then in the Ottoman Empire, today in North Macedonia. He studied in Ohrid, and later at the Constantinople Theological Seminary (1900 - 1906). Then he was a clerk in the Bulgarian Exarchate in Constantinople (1906 - 1907). In 1908-1912 he studied at the Kiev Theological Academy. In 1913-1926 he was a Bulgarian teacher at the Constantinople Seminary and in the Sofia Seminary. Snegarov became a full-time associate professor at the Faculty of Theology at the Sofia University (1926), full professor (1933), corresponding member of the Bulgarian Academy of Sciences (1933), academician (1943). He headed the Department of History at the Sofia Seminary (1950), where he continued to work as a part-time professor from 1951 to 1956. He was the director of the Institute of Bulgarian History at the Bulgarian Academy of Sciences from its founding in 1947 to 1950, director of the Archival Institute at the Bulgarian Academy of Sciences (1951-1959). Snegarov was a founding member of the Macedonian Scientific Institute.

He died in Sofia in 1971.
