= Bradashesh =

Administrative unit in Elbasan County, Albania

- Administrative unit
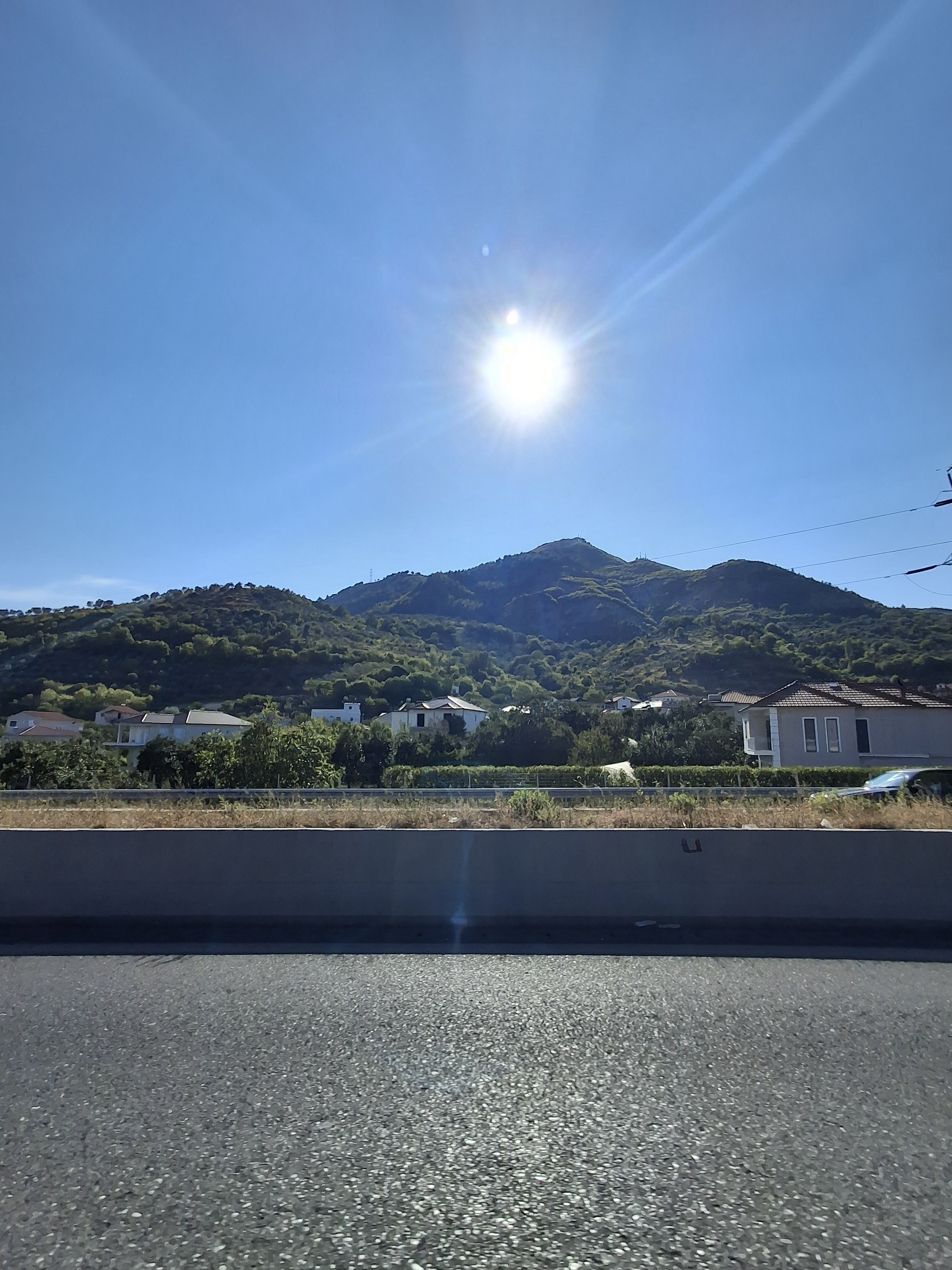
- An image of Shijon, an administrative unit within Bradashesh

- Location within Albania
- Coordinates: 41°6′N 20°1′E
- Country: Albania
- County: Elbasan
- Municipality: Elbasan

Population (2011)
  - Administrative unit: 10,700
- Time zone: UTC+1 (CET)
  - Summer (DST): UTC+2 (CEST)
- Area Code: 0583

Bradashesh is a village and a former municipality in Elbasan County, central Albania. At the 2015 local government reform it became a subdivision of the municipality Elbasan. The population at the 2011 census was 10,700. The municipal unit consists of the villages Bradashesh, Balëz Lart, Balëz Poshte, Kusarth, Kozan, Karakullak, Letan, Rrile, Shtemaj, Ulem, Katund i Ri, Fikas, Petresh, Shemhill, Shingjon, Reçan and Gurabardhë.

In antiquity, the Via Egnatia was crossing the area and a Roman settlement named Ad Quintum was located at the place of present Bradashesh. The city was probably founded in the period from the late second to early third century AD, and was populated until the 4th century. Today it is a well-preserved archaeological site with remarkable ruins of a Roman villa and a very fine example of a Roman bathhouse.
