= Arsenios Kardamakis =

Greek Orthodox bishop (b. 1973)

His Eminence Arsenios
- Metropolitan of Austria
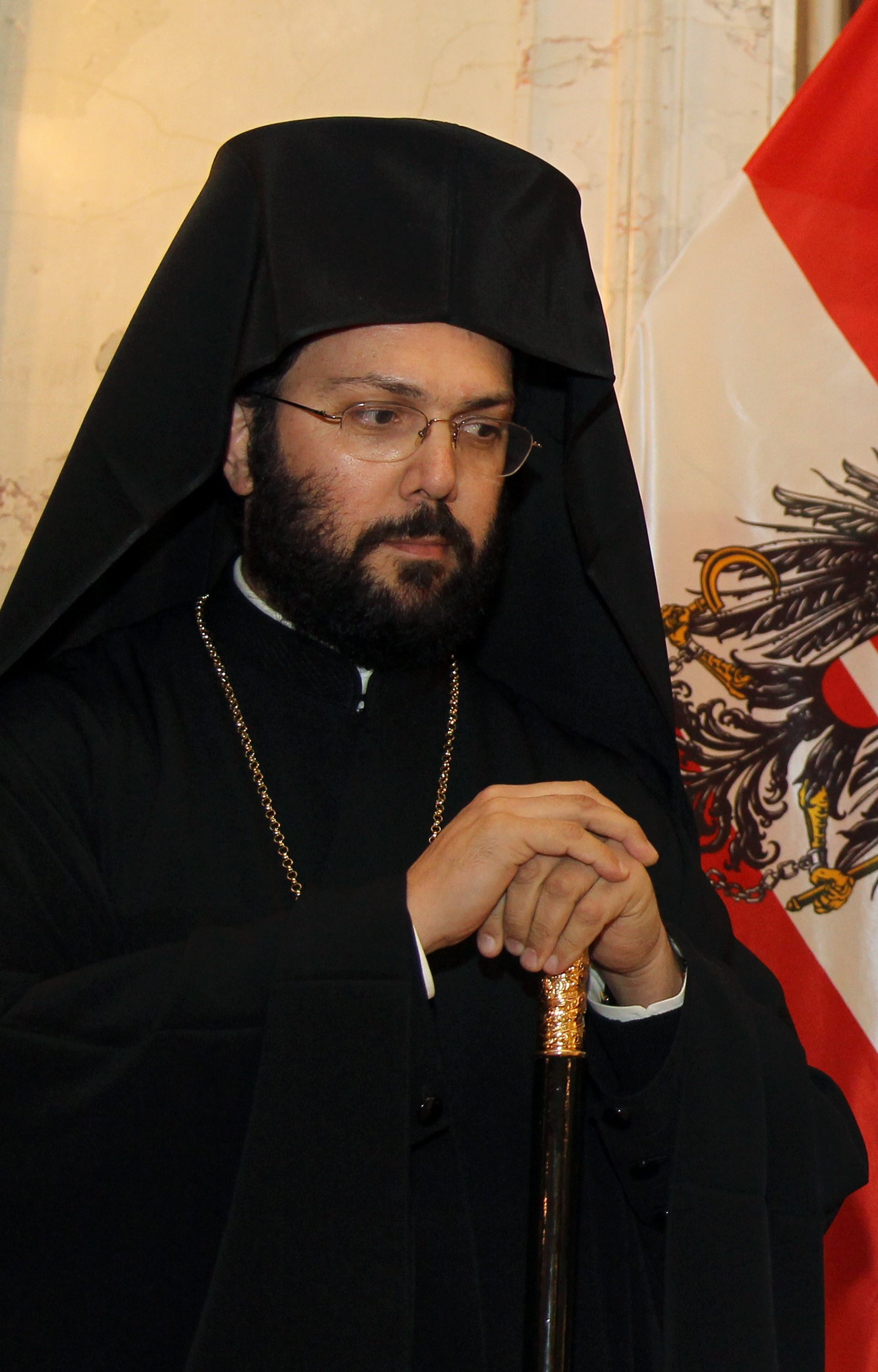
- Arsenios in 2014
- Church: Ecumenical Patriarchate of Constantinople
- Metropolis: Metropolis of Austria
- See: Vienna
- Elected: November 3, 2011
- Installed: December 4, 2011
- Term ended: Incumbent
- Predecessor: Michael (Staikos)

Orders
- Ordination: 1998 (diaconate); 2002 (priesthood)
- Consecration: December 4, 2011

Personal details
- Born: Arsenios Kardamakis; October 31, 1973 (age 52) Heraklion, Crete, Greece
- Denomination: Eastern Orthodox Christianity
- Education: Rizarios Ecclesiastical School of Athens; University of Strasbourg

Metropolitan Arsenios (Secular name: Arsenios Kardamakis Greek: Ἀρσένιος Καρδαμάκης; born October 31, 1973) is a bishop in the Ecumenical Patriarchate of Constantinople, the Metropolitan of Austria since 2011.

== Early life and education ==
Arsenios was born on October 31, 1973, in Heraklion, Greece. He went to high school in Athens and studied Orthodox theology in Athens and Thessaloniki, and also studied Catholic theology at the University of Strasbourg, where he obtained a doctorate in 2011. In 1998 he was ordained into the deaconate and as a priest in 2002. He was tonsured a monk at the Monastery of Saint George of Epanosifi in Crete. In 2004 he became Vicar General of the Metropolis of France, and from 2005 to 2012 he acted as co-secretary of the World Council of Churches in France.

== Bishop ==
At the age of 38, Arsenios was elected as Metropolitan of Austria on November 3, 2011, and enthroned on December 4. He was inaugurated at the Orthodox Trinity Church in Vienna. In attendance were Cardinal Christoph Schönborn and Metropolitan Dimitrios (Ploumis). With his election, he also became chairman of the Orthodox Bishops' Conference for Austria.

Under Arsenios's leadership, the first Greek Orthodox Monastery in Austria was opened in 2014, however construction wasn't started until 2020 due to objections from some of the locals and postponed due to the increase of construction prices due to the COVID-19 recession. Due to the strict measures put in place due to the COVID-19 pandemic, Arsenios began administering the Holy Communion separately, as opposed to traditional orthodox practices of serving wine and bread within the same chalice and spoon.

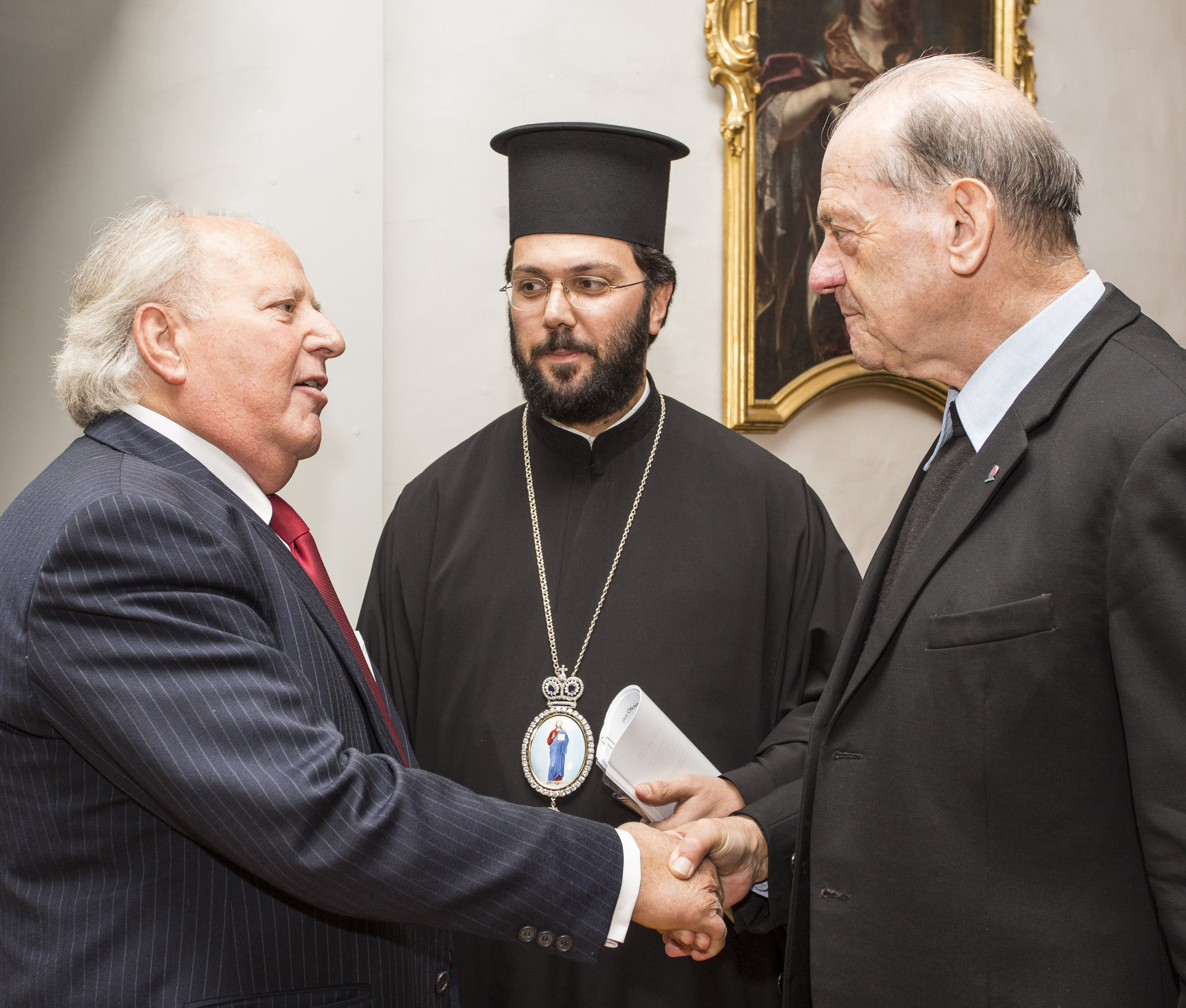
Arsenios (center) with Philipp Harnoncourt (right) and Grigorios Larentzakis (left) in 2012

The Metropolitan has focused his efforts on proselytizing and has enjoyed good relations with the Catholic Church, and has worked towards mending the schism. Many smaller parishes in the countryside often operate with the assistance of nearby Catholic churches. During the visit by Pope Leo XIV to Turkey and Lebanon, Arsenios described the Pope and the Patriarch "brothers, not rivals". In 2024, he expressed his condolences to recently deceased Archbishop Alois Kothgasser. He blessed Lake Constance with the bishop of Vorarlberg in a ceremony as a part of his pastoral tour in 2025.

Metropolitan Arsenios has also worked with other religious leaders in Austria to help combat prejudice and encourage interfaith dialogue. In 2020, in a meeting organized by the European People’s Party with other religious leaders in attendance, Arsenios stated that the future of Europe must be based on religious principals.

== Views ==
When asked how many churches there are in Austria, Arsenios replied "The correct answer is: An Orthodox Church."

As Bishop, Arsenios has called for unity amongst all Orthodox churches. Due to the 2018 Moscow–Constantinople schism, Arsenios's Russian counterpart has not been in attendance of any meetings held by the archdiocese. Arsenios has been vocal against the Russian invasion of Ukraine and has repeatedly condemned the Russian Orthodox Church's description of it as a "holy war".

Arsenios has also called for stronger measures to combat climate change, including more attention to environmental protection and climate neutrality within the archdiocese.

In 2023, he strongly condemned any attacks on civilians in the Gaza war, calling for an immediate ceasefire.

== Bibliography ==
- Oriesching, Dominik (2022). "Arsenios Kardamakis". The Ambiguous Land. A History of Burgenland, Told Through Objects, Places, and People. echomedia Buchverlag Wien. pp. 210–213. ISBN 9783903989221.

== Honours and awards ==
- Order of Merit (Hungary)

== See also ==
- Greeks in Austria
- Greeks in Hungary
- Orthodoxy in Austria
- Orthodoxy in Hungary

Eastern Orthodox Church titles
Preceded by Michael (Staikos)	Metropolitan of Austria; 2018 – Present	Succeeded by Incumbent
