= Greeks in Austria =

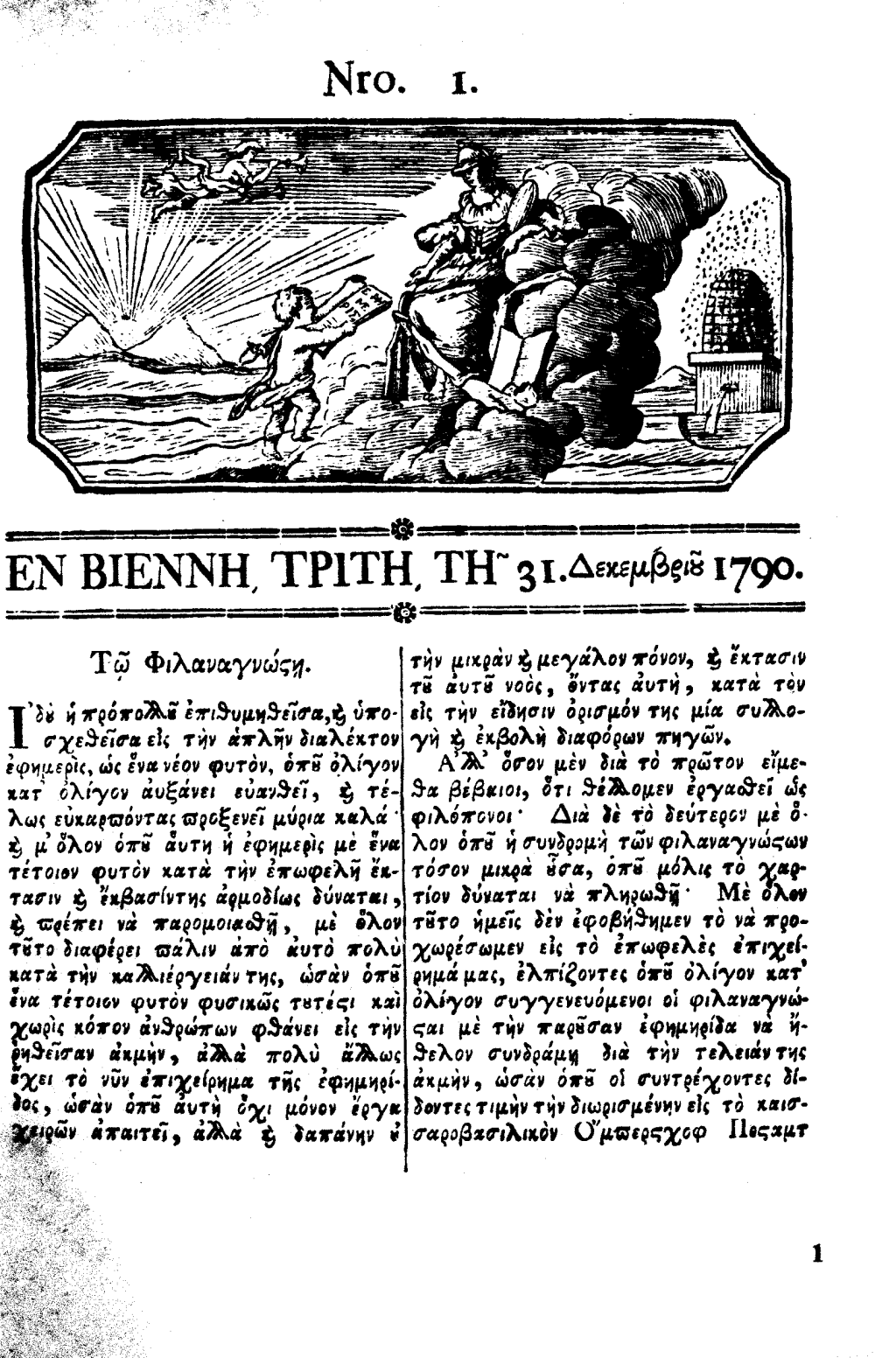
Ephimeris, a Greek newspaper issued in Vienna

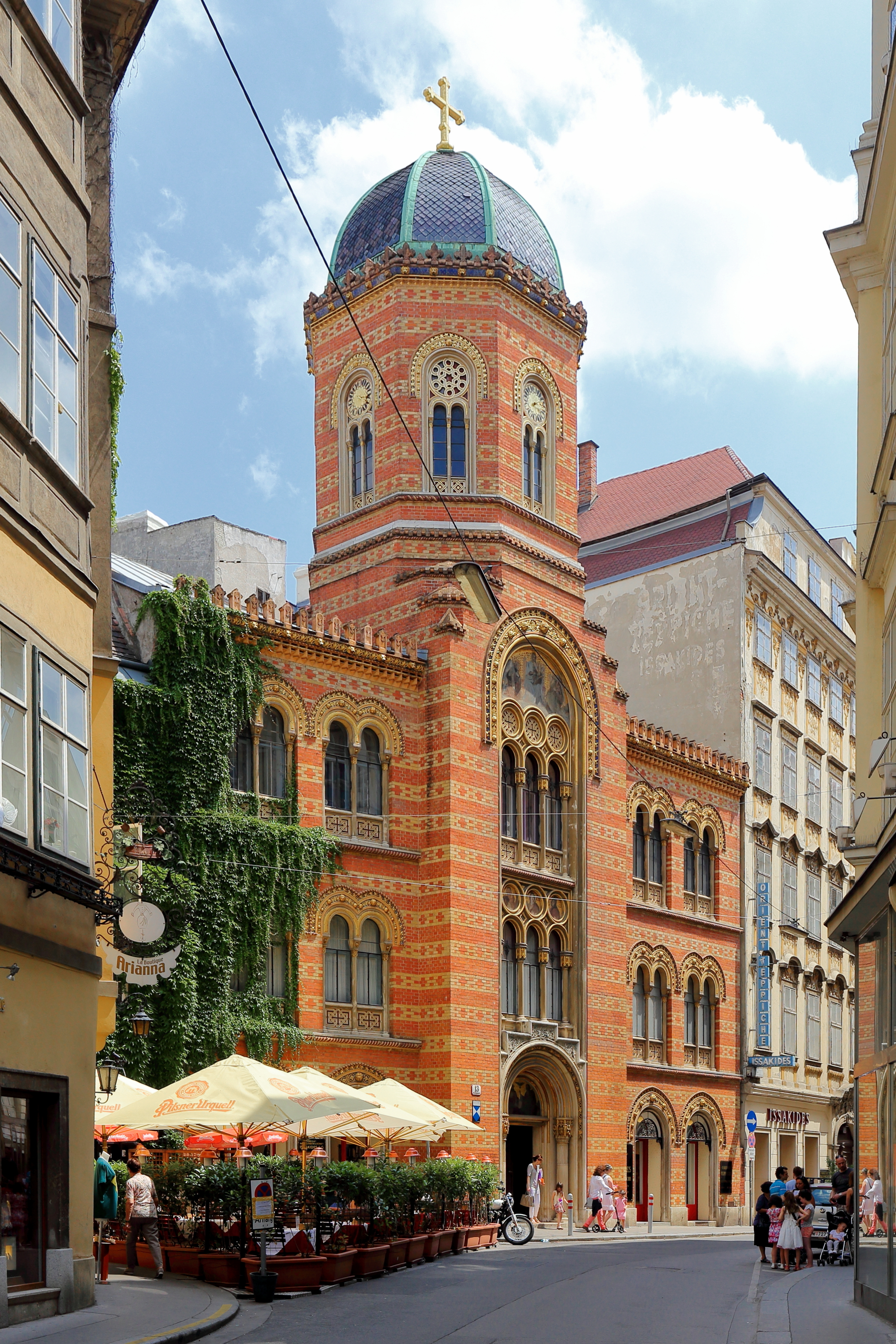
View of the Greek Orthodox church of Vienna

Greeks in Austria number between 5,000 and 18,000 people. They are located all around the country, but the main community is located in Vienna.

== History ==
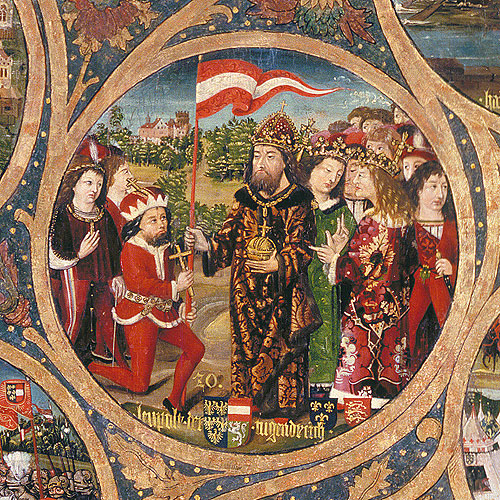
Leopold V, Duke of Austria, descendant of the Komnenoi dynasty of the Byzantine Empire

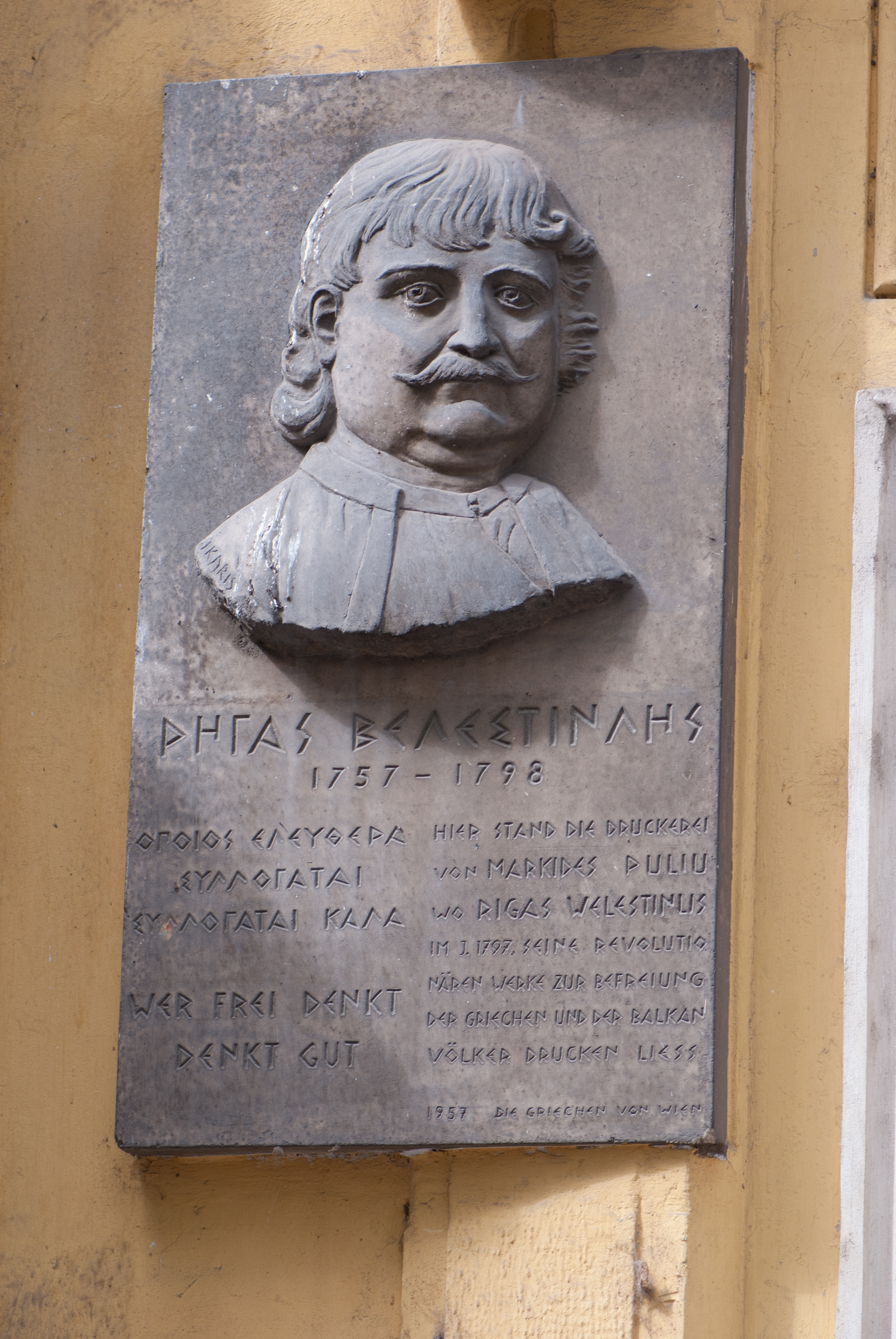
Commemorative plaque for Rigas in Vienna

Contacts between the Greeks and the Austrians can be traced to the First Crusade and its aftermath, when members of the ruling House of Babenberg took the cross and visited the Byzantine Empire. These contacts led to two royal marriages: Duke Henry II (r. 1141–1177) married Theodora Komnene, a niece of Emperor Manuel I Komnenos, while the couple's grandson, Leopold VI (r. 1194–1230), married Theodora Angelina, granddaughter of Emperor Alexios III Angelos. Despite popular narratives to the effect that a Greek community settled in Vienna as a result, or that Byzantine customs and even songs were introduced into Austria at the time, this is not corroborated by the sources.

The Armenian Johannes Theodat opened on 17 January 1685 Vienna's first coffee house in Haarmarkt. As a reward for his services, he was granted the privilege of being the only trader in the city to sell coffee as a drink for 20 years. Following, by 1700, four Greek merchants had the privilege to serve coffee in public.

The 1718 Treaty of Passarowitz led to the establishment of formal commercial relations between the Habsburg monarchy and the Ottoman Empire, followed by the foundation of the Imperial Privileged Oriental Company. As a result, a wave of Greek merchants, principally from Macedonia, began activities in Central Europe, leading to the establishment of trading colonies across the region. Vienna, as the capital of the Habsburgs and possessing an important geographical position between the Ottoman Balkans and Central and Northern Europe, attracted the lion's share of such immigrants. The Greeks settled mostly in the areas of Fleischmarkt, Hafnersteig, Hoher Markt, Rothgasse and Sonnenfeldgasse in what is now Vienna's inner city. By 1723, the local Greek community was large enough that Emperor Charles VI granted them the right to build their own church. In 1784 a church dedicated to Saint George was built for the Ottoman subjects, while shortly after the Holy Trinity Church was built nearby for those Greeks who were Austrian subjects. By the end of the century, it is estimated that 80,000 Greek families had settled in the Habsburg lands.

In the late 18th century, Vienna was the centre of Greek diaspora where persons like Rigas Feraios, Anthimos Gazis, Neophytos Doukas and the Ypsilantis family prepared the Greek War of Independence. There were also various institutions founded in Vienna that promote the Greek language and learning, contributing to the Modern Greek Enlightenment. In 1814, the Count Ioannis Kapodistrias, at that time Foreign Minister of the Russian Empire, in collaboration with Anthimos Gazis, founded in Vienna the Philomuse Society, an educational organization promoting philhellenism, such as studies for the Greeks in Europe.

Additionally, ethnic Aromanians coming mostly from Moscopole, and generally from the Balkans, who self-identified as Greeks, have also been considered as part of the Greek diaspora.

Furthermore, of great economic importance and social acknowledgment attained the Greeks in Austria in the 19th century. The first Greek newspaper was printed there and the Hellenic National School in Vienna is today the oldest such in the world that has remained continuously in operation. In 1856, after a request by Simon Sinas, Johann Strauss II composed the Hellenen-Polka (Hellenes Polka) op. 203 for an annual ball of the Greek community in the Austro-Hungarian empire.

In the 20th century, Austria (and especially Graz and Linz) was a popular destination for Greek students.

== Architectural heritage ==
The Austrian magnate of Greek origin Georgios Sinas (father of Simon Sinas) invited the Danish architect Theophil Hansen who worked in Athens (and had designed there major public buildings like the Zappeion and the Academy of Athens) to design for him some new buildings for his companies in Austria. Other Greek Austrians like Nikolaus Dumba and Ignaz von Ephrussi also gave Hansen contracts for buildings in the Classical Greek style and the Gräzisierter-Neorennaissance-Stil. After Works like the Palais Ephrussi and the Palais Dumba Hansen was famous and build many other public buildings in Austria like the Parliament of Austria and the Musikverein.

In the former Greek Quarter of Vienna at the Fleischmarkt there are the two historical Greek Orthodox parishes (St George and Holy Trinity). A traditional Austrian Restaurant there is called Griechenbeisl ("Greek Tavern", because of its Greek visitors since the 18th century) and a street Griechengasse ("Greek Lane").

== Notable Greeks in Austria ==
- Coudenhove-Kalergi family, noble family of mixed Flemish and Cretan Greek descent
- Nikolaus Dumba (c. 1830–1900), industrialist, liberal politician, benefactor of Greece and patron of the arts. He sponsored the construction of Musikverein.
- Peter Duka von Kadar, notable general during the Napoleonic Wars
- Konstantin Dumba (c. 1856–1947), diplomat serving as its last accredited Ambassador to the United States
- Simon Sinas (c. 1810–1876), banker and diplomat, benefactor of Greece
- Constantin von Economo (c. 1876–1931), psychiatrist and neurologist
- Ephrussi family, banking family of Romaniotes descent
- Demeter Laccataris (c. 1798–1864), painter based in Pest
- Logothetti family, noble family originally from Zante
- Hugo II Logothetti (c. 1852–1918), diplomat and last emissary of the Habsburg monarchy in Tehran
- Baltazzi family, aristocratic banking family, baroness Mary Vetsera's maternal family
- Theodor Baltazzi (c. 1788–1860), prominent banker born in Istanbul
- Aristides Baltazzi (c. 1843–1914), was a horse breeder, member of the Austrian Imperial Council and large landowner.
- Pappas Family, founders of the Alpine construction group and importers of Mercedes-Benz in Austria and Hungary
- Anastasios Pappas, Merchant in Vienna, 1821 revolutionary, member of Filiki Eteria and son of Emmanouel Pappas the Leader of the Greek War of Independence in Macedonia
- Karajan family, merchant family based in Chemnitz then Electorate of Saxony
  - Herbert von Karajan (c. 1908–1989), principal conductor of the Berlin Philharmonic
  - Theodor von Karajan (c. 1810–1873), president of the Austrian Academy of Sciences
- Georg Zachariades (c. 1848–1943) industrialist, figure skater and racing cyclist
- Georg von Metaxa (c. 1914–1944), tennis player, his father was descended from the aristocratic Metaxas family from Cephallonia.
- Konstantin Filippou, chef and restaurateur
- Maria Vassilakou (b. 1969), Vice-Mayor of Vienna, President of the Viennese branch of The Greens – The Green Alternative, the fourth party in the Austrian Parliament
- Karolos Trikolidis. conductor
- Peter Persidis, football player
- Vasiliki Alexandri, synchronized swimmer
- Anna-Maria Alexandri, synchronized swimmer
- Eirini-Marina Alexandri, synchronized swimmer

== See also ==
- Austria–Greece relations
- Immigration to Austria
- Greek Orthodox Metropolis of Austria

== Sources ==
- Preiser-Kapeller, Johannes (2011). "Von Ostarrichi an den Bosporus. Ein Überblick zu den Beziehungen im Mittelalter" [From Ostarrichi to the Bosporus: An Overview of Relations in the Middle Ages]. Pro Oriente Jahrbuch 2010. Vienna: 66–77.
- Vakalopoulos, Apostolos E. (1973). Ιστορία του νέου ελληνισμού, Τόμος Δ′: Τουρκοκρατία 1669–1812 – Η οικονομική άνοδος και ο φωτισμός του γένους (Έκδοση Β′) [History of modern Hellenism, Volume IV: Turkish rule 1669–1812 – Economic upturn and enlightenment of the nation (2nd Edition)] (in Greek). Thessaloniki: Emm. Sfakianakis & Sons.
