= Greek Orthodox Metropolis of Austria =

Metropolis of the Greek Orthodox Church

Metropolis of Austria and Exarchate of Hungary and Central Europe
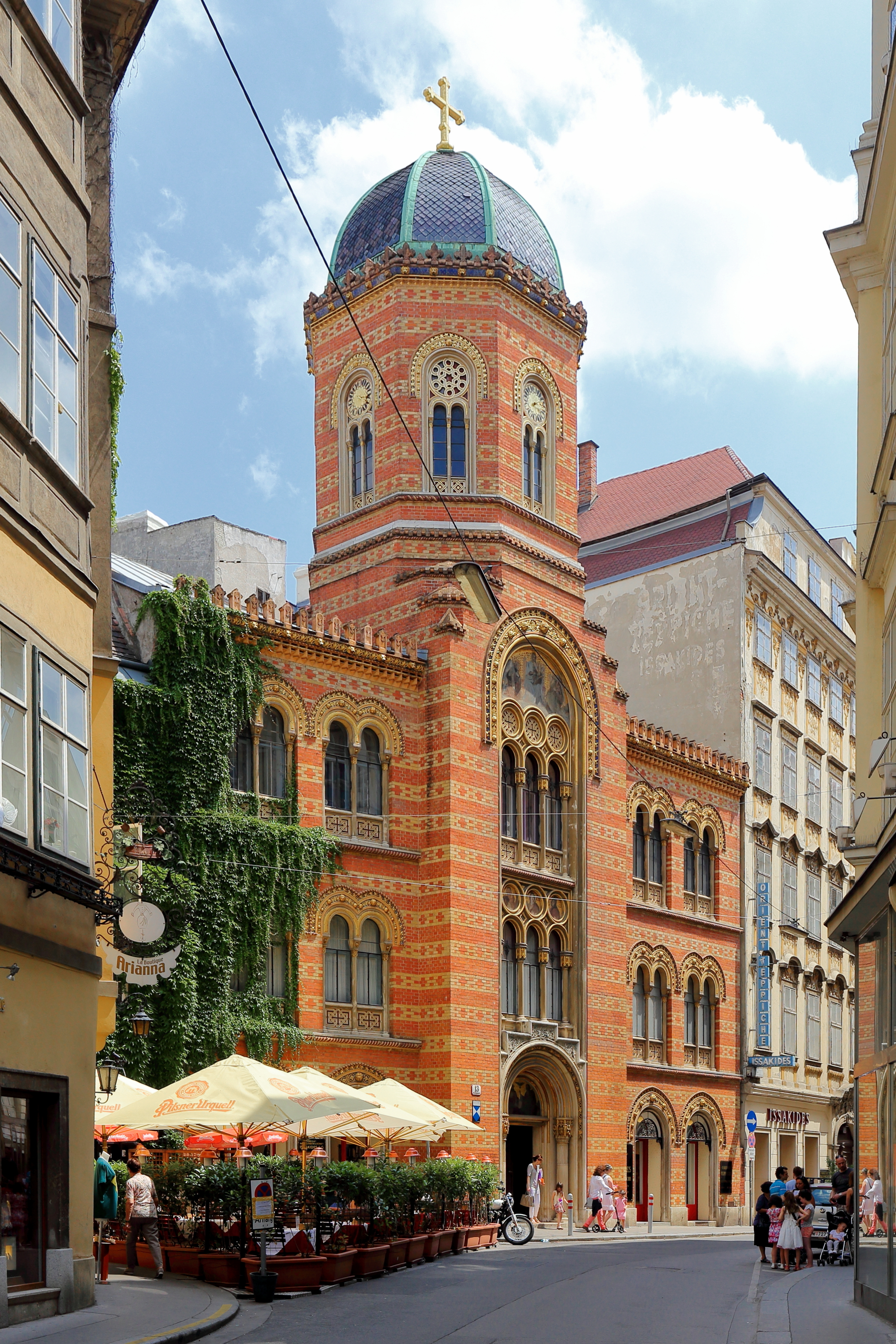
- Greek Church of the Holy Trinity in Vienna

Location
- Country: Austria
- Territory: Austria and Hungary
- Headquarters: Fleischmarkt 13, 1010 Vienna, Austria

Statistics
- Population: Total: 30,000
- Parishes: 21

Information
- Secular priests: 15
- Language: Greek, German

Current leadership
- Patriarch: Ecumenical Patriarch of Constantinople
- Metropolitan: Arsenios (Kardamakis)

Website
- https://www.metropolisvonaustria.at/

The Metropolis of Austria and Exarchate of Hungary and Central Europe (Greek: Ιερά Μητρόπολις Αυστρίας και Εξαρχία Ουγγαρίας και Μεσευρώπης, German: Metropolis von Austria und Exarchat von Ungarn und Mitteleuropa) is a metropolis of the Greek Orthodox Church founded in 1964. It is headed by Metropolitan Arsenios of Austria since 2011.

== History ==
Greek presence in Austria can be attested to the 1st century CE based on archaeological excavations. When diplomatic relations were set between the Byzantine Empire and the Duchy of Austria a marriage was arranged between Duke Henry II and Theodora Komnene, niece of Manuel I Komnenos.

Before 1918 (de facto 1920) all Orthodox faithfuls in Austria-Hungary were under the spiritual jurisdiction of the Patriarchate of Karlovci.

In 1924 the Ecumenical Patriarch founded the Metropolis of Central Europe, which included Austria, with its first bishop as Germanos (Karavangelis). When Germanos died on February 11, 1935, the Metropolis of Central Europe was absorbed into the Archdiocese of Great Britain. On February 17, 1963, the Metropolis of Austria, the Exarchate of Hungary and Central Europe was created with Chrysostomos (Tsiter) becoming its first bishop.

The diocese runs and operates the Greek National School in Vienna, which was opened in the 19th century. It is the oldest Greek diaspora school in existence.

=== Exarchate of Hungary ===
The Archbishop of Austria also acts as the exarch of Hungary. In 2021, there were between 8,000 and 10,000 regular attendees within the diocese.

== List of bishops ==
=== Metropolis of Central Europe ===
- Germanos (Karavangelis) (1924–1935)

=== Metropolis of Austria ===
- Chrysostomos (Tsiter) (1963–1991)
- Michael (Staikos) (1991–2011)
- Arsenios (Kardamakis) (2011–present)

== See also ==
- Eastern Orthodoxy in Austria
- Greeks in Austria
- Greeks in Hungary
- Austria–Greece relations
- Hungary-Greece relations
