= Marx Augustin =

Austrian musician and poet

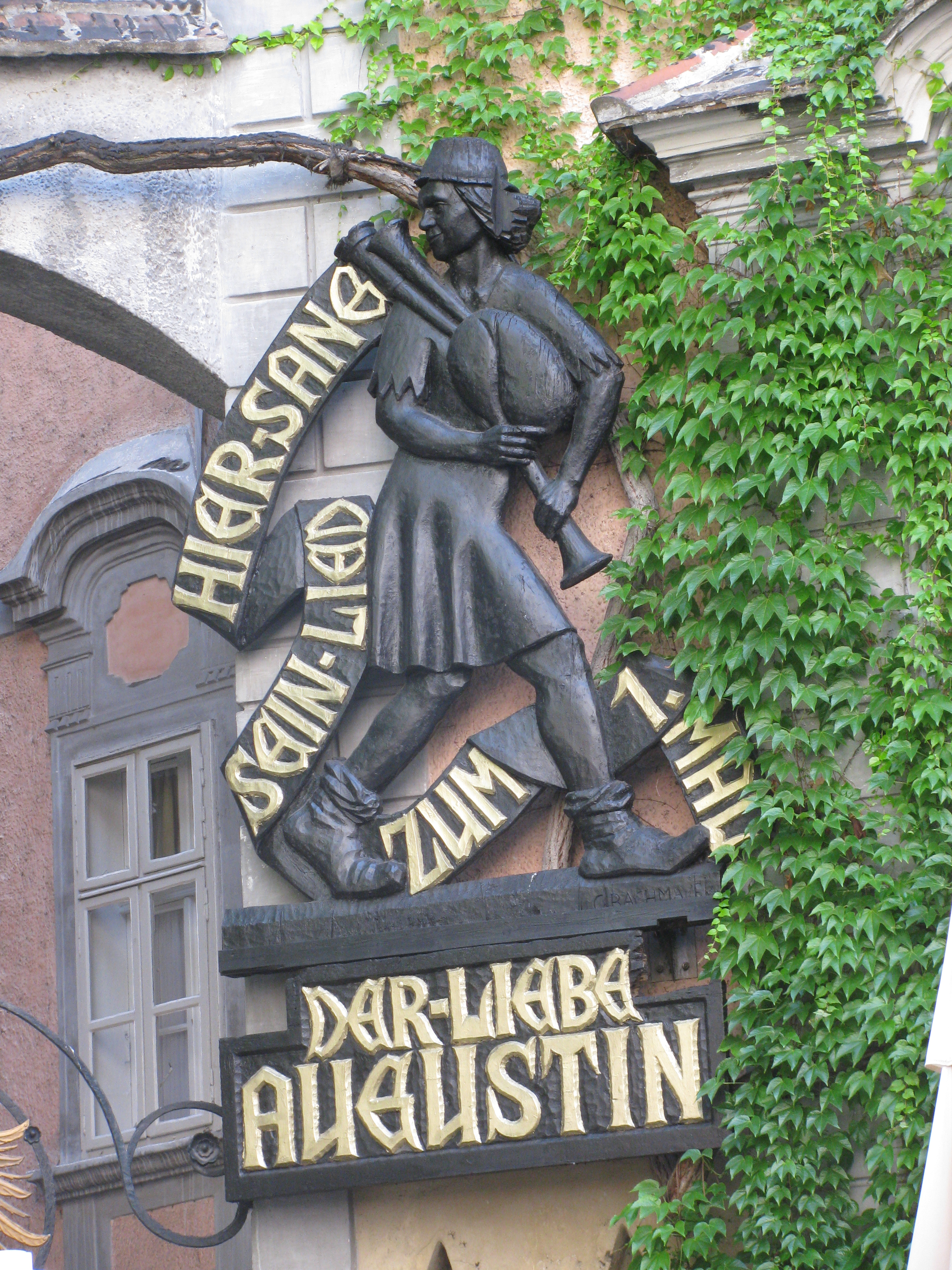
His plate at the Griechenbeisl, Vienna.

Marx Augustin (also Markus Augustin, "Der Liebe Augustin") was a fictional Austrian minstrel, bagpiper, and improvisatory poet most famous for the song, "O du lieber Augustin" attributed to him.
