= Griechenbeisl =

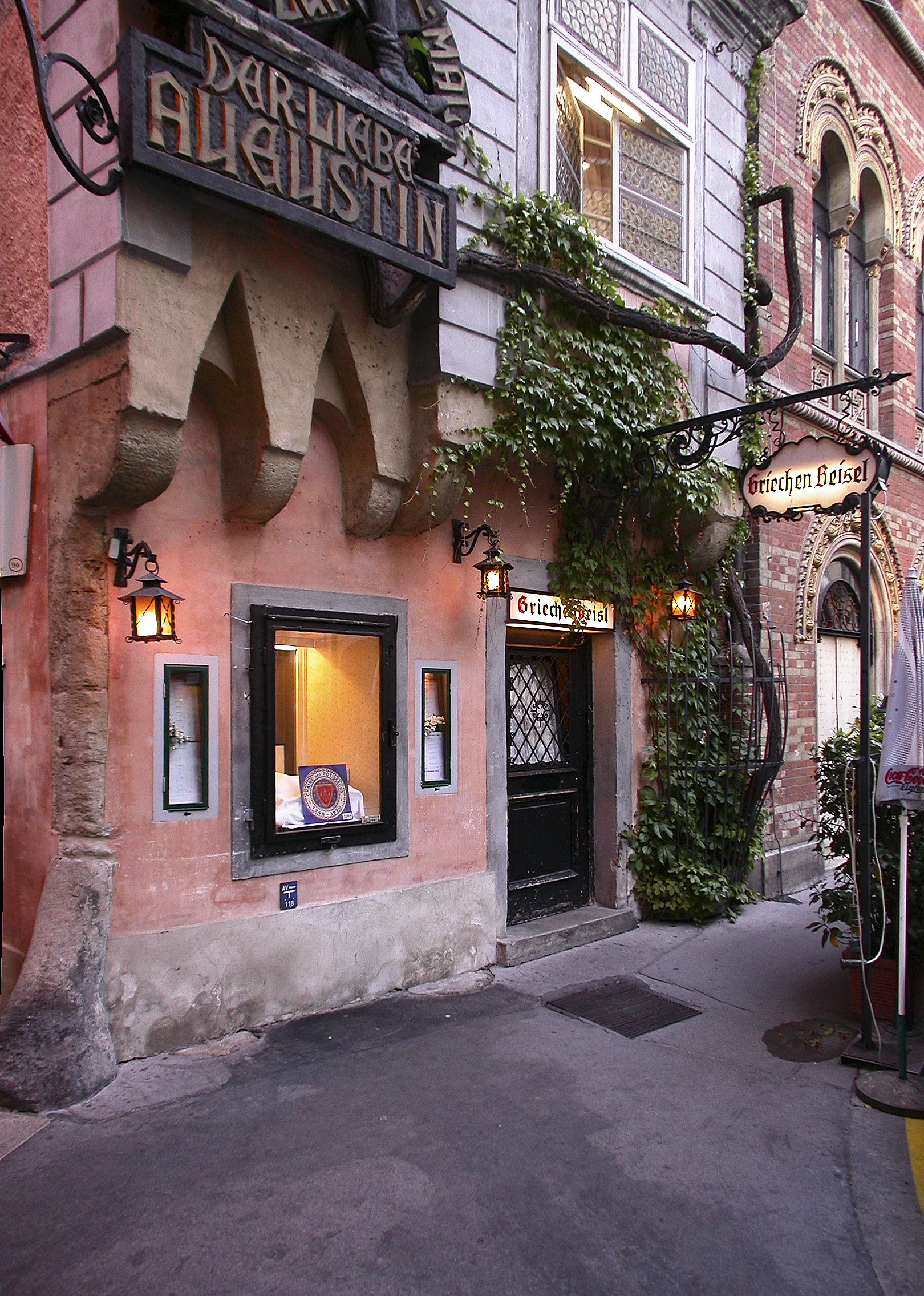
Exterior of the restaurant

Griechenbeisl ('Greek bistro' or 'Greek bar'; cf. Viennese German Beisl 'bar' or 'pub') is one of the oldest restaurants in Vienna, Austria. Established in 1447 and having operated under several different names, the restaurant is located at Fleischmarkt 11 in the Innere Stadt district, beside the Holy Trinity Greek Orthodox Church.

The restaurant derives its name from the Levantine merchants, who lived in the vicinity of the building, and the intensive trade relations between Vienna and the Orient since the time of the Babenberger period.

The first documentary mention of the Griechenbeisl dates back to 1447. Around 1500, the building later to become part of (and named for) the Greek quarter was called "Zum gelben Adler" ("At (the sign of) the Yellow Eagle"). In later records the building is referred to as a "guest house" - this name being associated with a tower forming part of the former town fortifications of circa 1200 and possibly incorporated later into a Late Gothic residential building in the 14th century. Nearer the present the Griechenbeisl remained in business under the name "Zum Goldenen Engel" (at the (sign of the) Golden Angel) (1762) or "Reichenberger Beisl". When Greek and Levantine merchants arrived around the middle of the seventeenth century, the area into which they moved became known as the Greek quarter. It was thus that the guest house acquired its present epithet "Greek". The food that it served, however was always of the traditional Viennese kind.

Historically important is the year 1852 when the host Leopold Schmied decided to bring the completely new "Pilsner Urquell" from Pilsen in Bohemia to Vienna for the first time.

The fictional singer and bagpiper Marx Augustin is said to have regularly appeared here in the 17th century.

== See also ==
- List of oldest companies
- List of restaurants in Vienna
