= Michael Staikos =

Greek Orthodox bishop

Michael
- Metropolitan of Austria
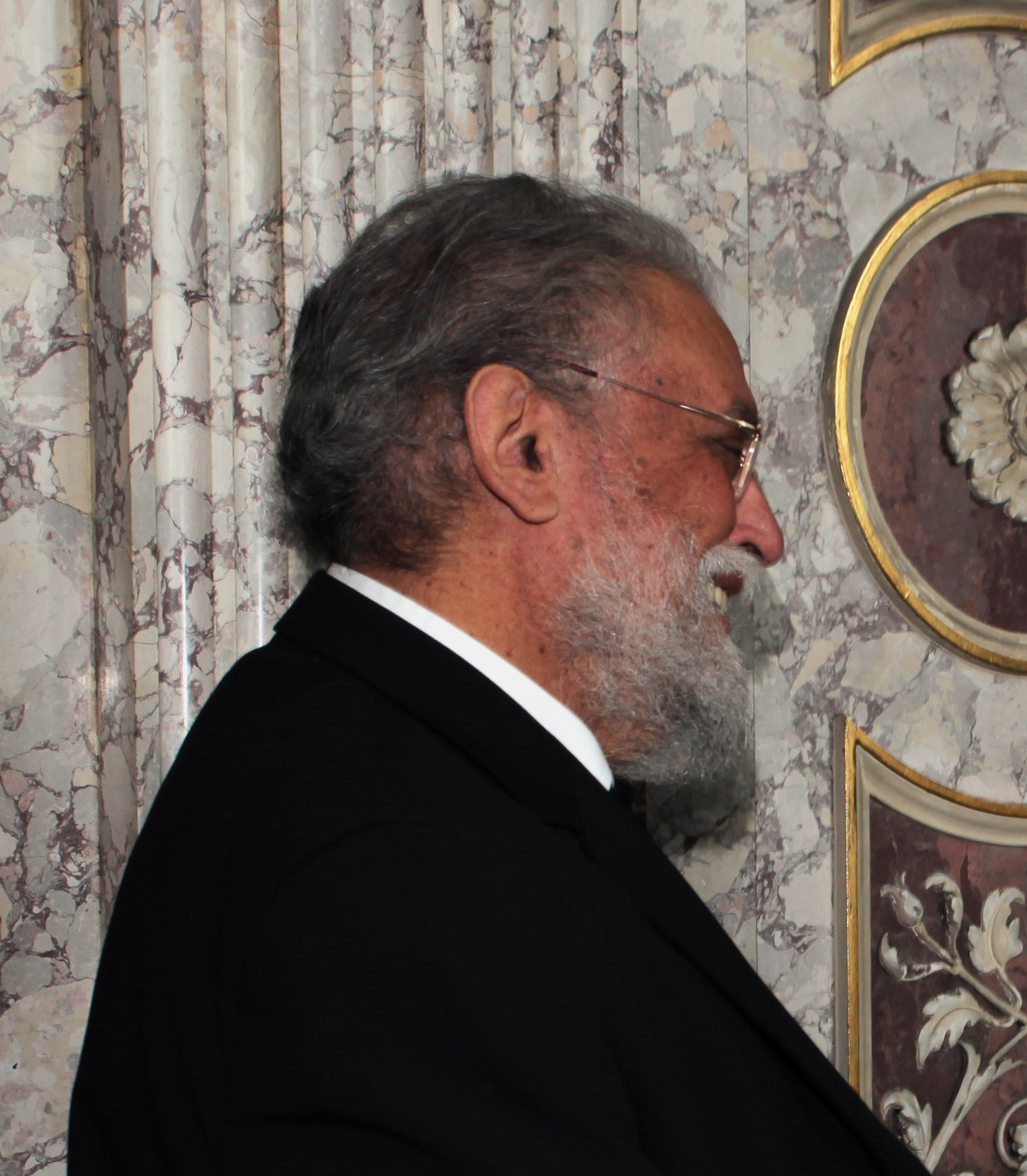
- Installed: 1991
- Term ended: 18 October 2011
- Predecessor: Chrysostomos (Tsiter)
- Successor: Arsenios (Kardamakis)

Personal details
- Born: Michael Staikos; 22 November, 1946 Athens, Greece
- Died: 18 October, 2011 Austria
- Denomination: Greek Orthodox

Metropolitan Michael (secular name: Michael Staikos; Greek: Μιχαήλ Στάικος; 22 November 1946 – 18 October 2011) was the second Eastern Orthodox metropolitan bishop of Austria; he held the position from 1991 until his death in 2011. He was succeeded by Metropolitan Arsenius.

== Notes ==
Eastern Orthodox Church titles
Preceded by Chrysostomos (Tsiter)	Metropolitan of Austria; 1991 – 2011	Succeeded by Arsenios (Kardamakis)
