= Eastern Orthodoxy in Austria =

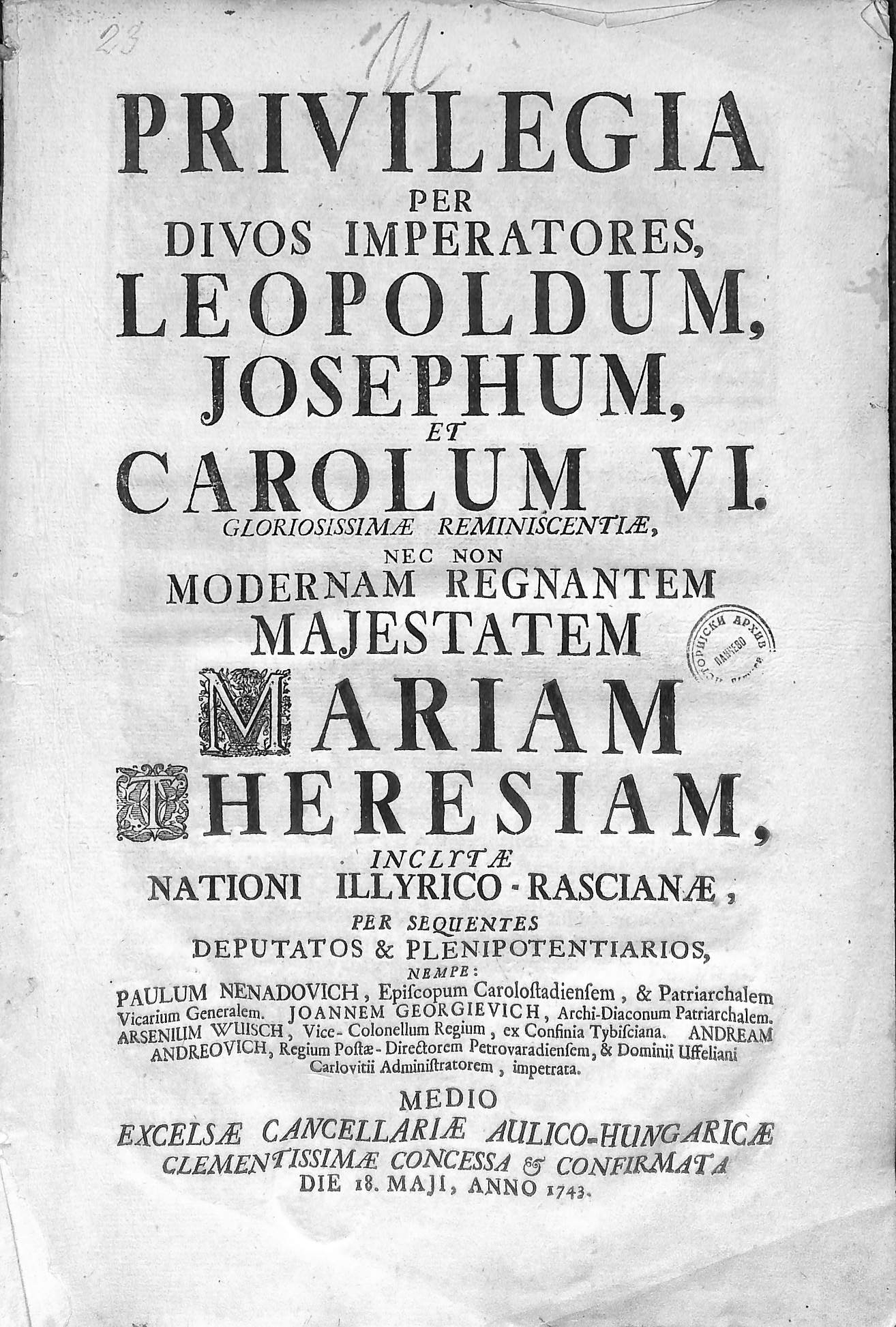
Charter on religious freedoms of Serbs in the Habsburg monarchy, issued in Vienna (1743) by Empress Maria Theresa

Eastern Orthodoxy in Austria refers to communities, institutions and organizations of the Eastern Orthodox Christianity on the territory of modern Austria. There are several Eastern Orthodox jurisdictions in Austria. As of 2019, it is estimated that there are some 400,000 to 450,000 Eastern Orthodox believers in Austria. Most of them are ethnic Serbs and Romanians.

== History ==
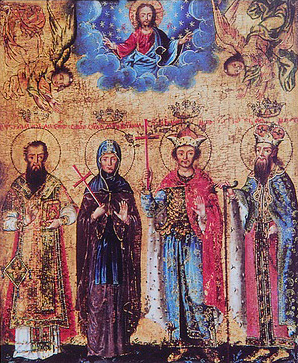
Eastern Orthodox icon (from the 17th century) representing members of the Branković dynasty, who lived in castle Weitensfeld (1479-1486)

By the end of the Middle Ages, migration of Eastern Orthodox Christians towards Austrian lands was intensified due to expansion of the Ottoman Empire in various regions of Southeastern Europe. Exiled members of Eastern Orthodox royal and noble families were welcomed by Habsburg rulers, who granted them new possessions. In 1479, emperor Friedrich III granted castle Weitensfeld in Carinthia to exiled members of Branković dynasty of Serbia. Often accompanied by their priests, exiled noble families created first Eastern Orthodox cells in Austrian lands.

During the period of Ottoman–Habsburg wars (16th-18th centuries), Habsburg policy towards Eastern Orthodox Christians was often marked by special interests, related to complex religious situation in various regions of the expanding Habsburg monarchy. Political aspirations of Habsburg rulers were directed towards various lands in Southeastern Europe, held by the declining Ottoman Empire. Since those regions were inhabited by Eastern Orthodox population, Habsburg court was inclined to adopt policy of religious tolerance.

Emperor Leopold I issued several charters (1690, 1691, 1695) to Eastern Orthodox Serbs, who sided with Habsburgs during the Vienna War (1683-1699), granting them religious freedom in the Monarchy. Serbian Orthodox patriarch Arsenije III visited the Austrian capital (Vienna) on several occasions, and died there in 1706.

Serbian Orthodox metropolitan Isaija Đaković, who visited the Austrian capital on several occasions since 1690, also died in Vienna, in 1708. During the 18th century, Eastern Orthodox communities in major Austrian cities were consisted mainly of ethnic Greeks, Serbs and Romanians. Most prominent among them were merchants and officers, who were the main donors of religious institutions, at first under the spiritual jurisdiction of the Metropolitanate of Karlovci (that became the Patriarchate of Karlovci in 1848). Later development led to the creation of autonomous and particular jurisdictions, thus establishing separate parishes for different ethnic communities. That process was finalized after the First World War (1914-1918).

== Eastern Orthodox Churches in Austria ==
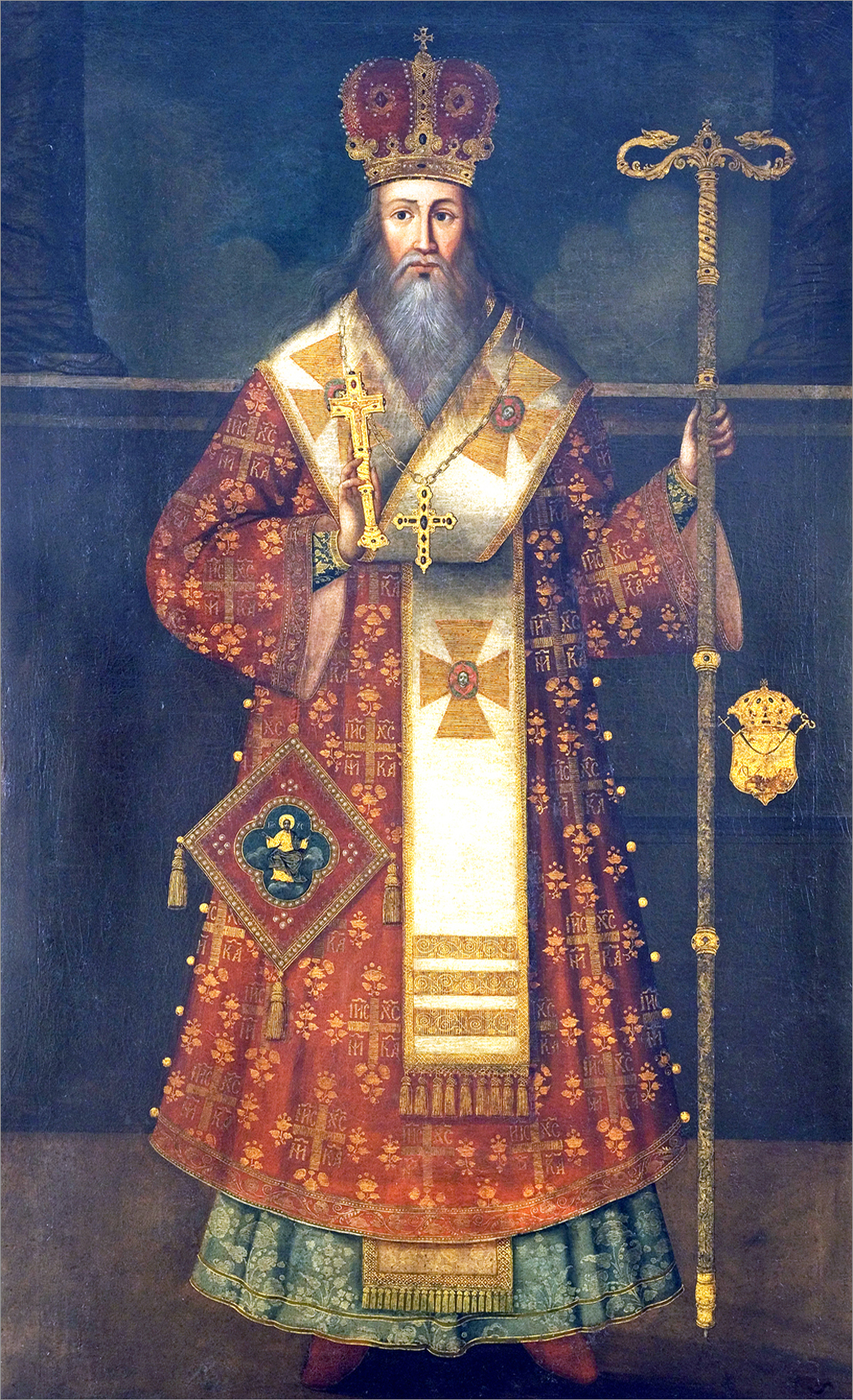
Serbian Patriarch Arsenije III, who died in Vienna in 1706

There are several Eastern Orthodox jurisdictions on the territory of modern Austria:

- Bulgarian Orthodox Church in Austria: Parish of St. Ivan Rilski, Vienna.
- Greek Orthodox Metropolis of Austria: 12 parishes, of which three are in Vienna.
- Greek Orthodox Patriarchate of Antioch: 2 parishes, in Vienna and Innsbruck.
- Romanian Orthodox Church in Austria: 5 parishes, of which one is in Vienna.
- Diocese of Vienna and Austria of Russian Orthodox Church: 7 parishes, of which two in Vienna.
- Eparchy of Austria of Serbian Orthodox Church: 30 parishes, of which three in Vienna.

== See also ==
- Metropolitanate of Karlovci
- Patriarchate of Karlovci
- Declaratory Rescript of the Illyrian Nation
- Catholic Church in Austria
- Old Catholic Church of Austria
- Religion in Austria
- Freedom of religion in Austria

== Literature ==
- Bataković, Dušan T., ed. (2005). Histoire du peuple serbe [History of the Serbian People] (in French). Lausanne: L’Age d’Homme. ISBN 9782825119587.
- Bronza, Boro (2010). "The Habsburg Monarchy and the Projects for Division of the Ottoman Balkans, 1771-1788". Empires and Peninsulas: Southeastern Europe between Karlowitz and the Peace of Adrianople, 1699–1829. Berlin: LIT Verlag. pp. 51–62. ISBN 9783643106117.
- Ćirković, Sima (2004). The Serbs. Malden: Blackwell Publishing. ISBN 9781405142915.
- Jireček, Constantin (1918). Geschichte der Serben. Vol. 2. Gotha: Perthes.
- Kiminas, Demetrius (2009). The Ecumenical Patriarchate: A History of Its Metropolitanates with Annotated Hierarch Catalogs. Wildside Press LLC. ISBN 9781434458766.
- Stiegnitz, Peter; Kosinski, Danuta (1990). Religions in Austria. Vienna: Federal Press Service.
- Todorović, Jelena (2006). An Orthodox Festival Book in the Habsburg Empire: Zaharija Orfelin's Festive Greeting to Mojsej Putnik (1757). Aldershot: Ashgate Publishing. ISBN 9780754656111.
