= Holy Trinity Greek Orthodox Church, Vienna =

Austrian Greek Orthodox Church

Coordinates: 48°12′39″N 16°22′39″E

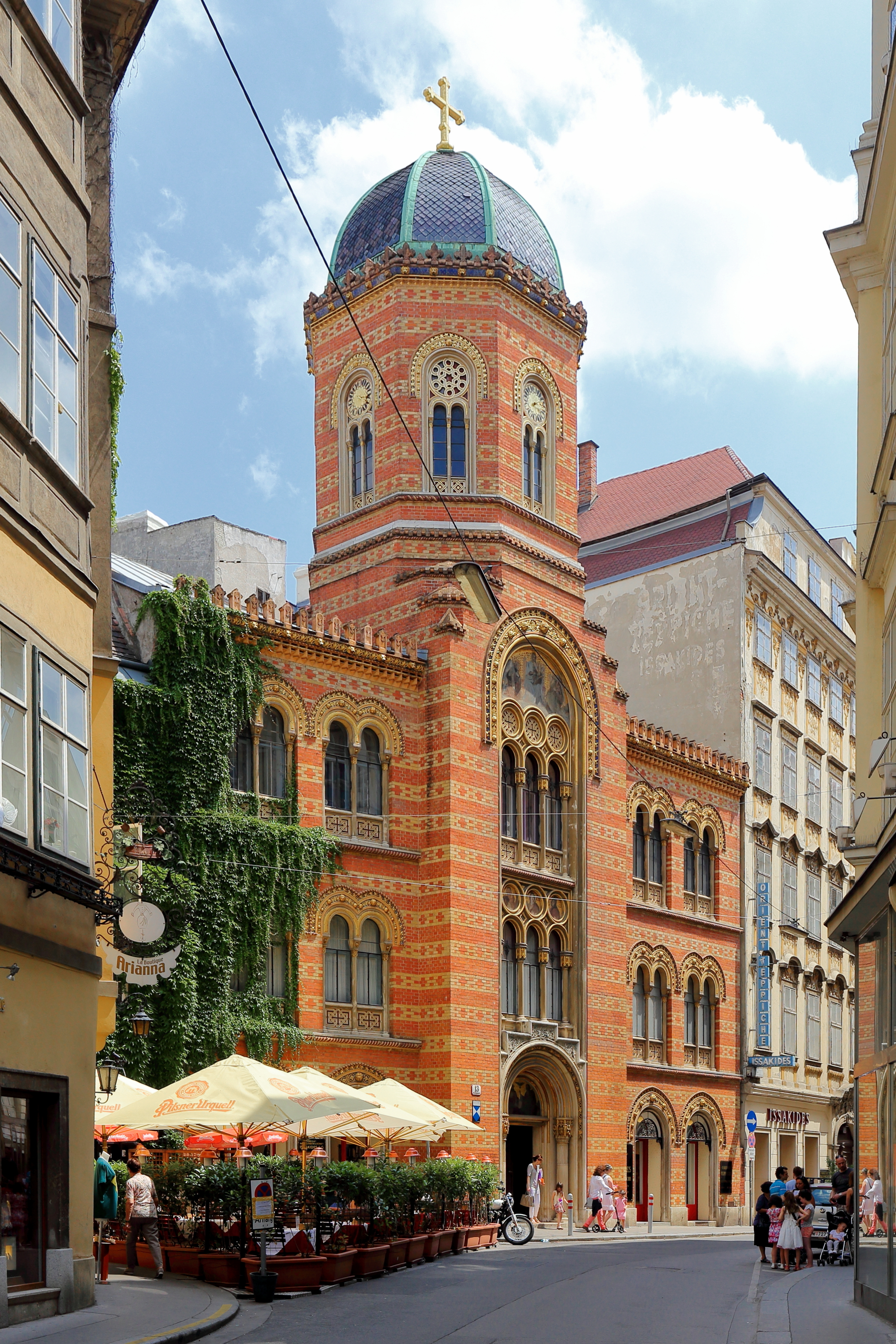
Holy Trinity Greek Orthodox Church, Vienna

Holy Trinity Greek Orthodox Church (German: Griechenkirche zur Heiligen Dreifaltigkeit) is a Greek Orthodox Church Cathedral in the first district of Vienna, Austria, in the historic Greek neighborhood of Vienna's Innere Stadt. The neighborhood has also been known as the "Fleischmarkt".

Since 1963, the cathedral has been the seat of the Greek Orthodox Metropolis of Austria, which belongs to the Ecumenical Patriarchate of Constantinople as the Metropolis of Austria and Exarchate of Hungary and Middle Europe.

== History ==
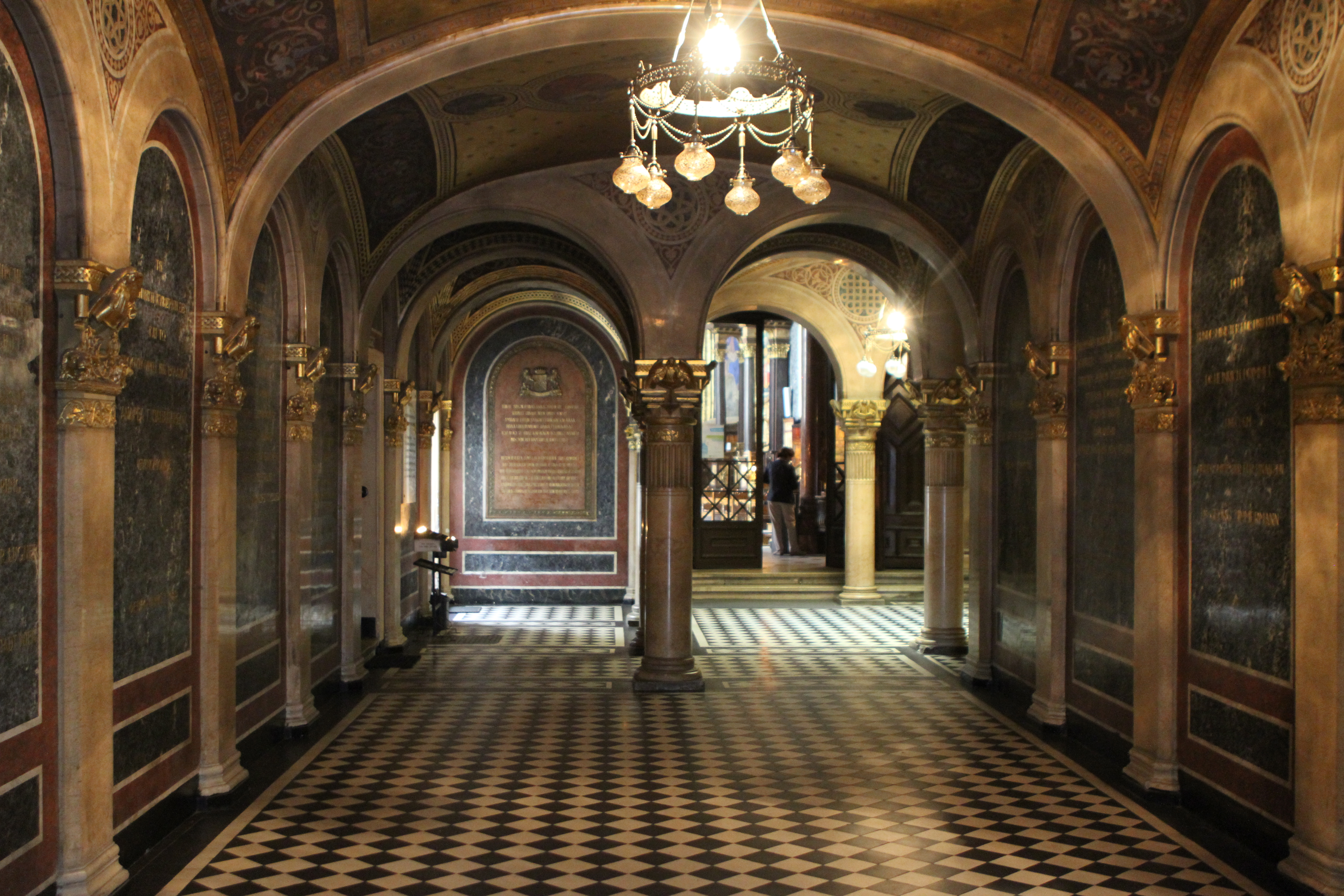
Church interior

Greek Orthodox churches have existed near this site since 1787, as a result of the 1781 Patent of Toleration issued by Joseph II, Holy Roman Emperor. The architect of the 1787 building was Peter Mollner.

The current building is a Byzantine Revival re-design of the Mollner building by Danish-Austrian neo-classic architect Theophil Hansen. Greek-Austrian diplomat and philanthropist Simon Sinas funded the project, one of many collaborations with Hansen in Vienna and Athens. The cathedral was inaugurated on December 21, 1858.

The exterior features two-tone brickwork and gilded archways. The elaborately ornamented sanctuary shows a stylish allusion to Baroque church architecture typical of southern Germany and Austria. A number of frescoes for the facade and vestibule were commissioned from the Austrian painter and art professor Carl Rahl, with other frescoes by Ludwig Thiersch.

The address is Fleischmarkt 13, 1010 Wien. Among the parishioners here was the family of conductor Herbert von Karajan.
