= Greece–Hungary relations =

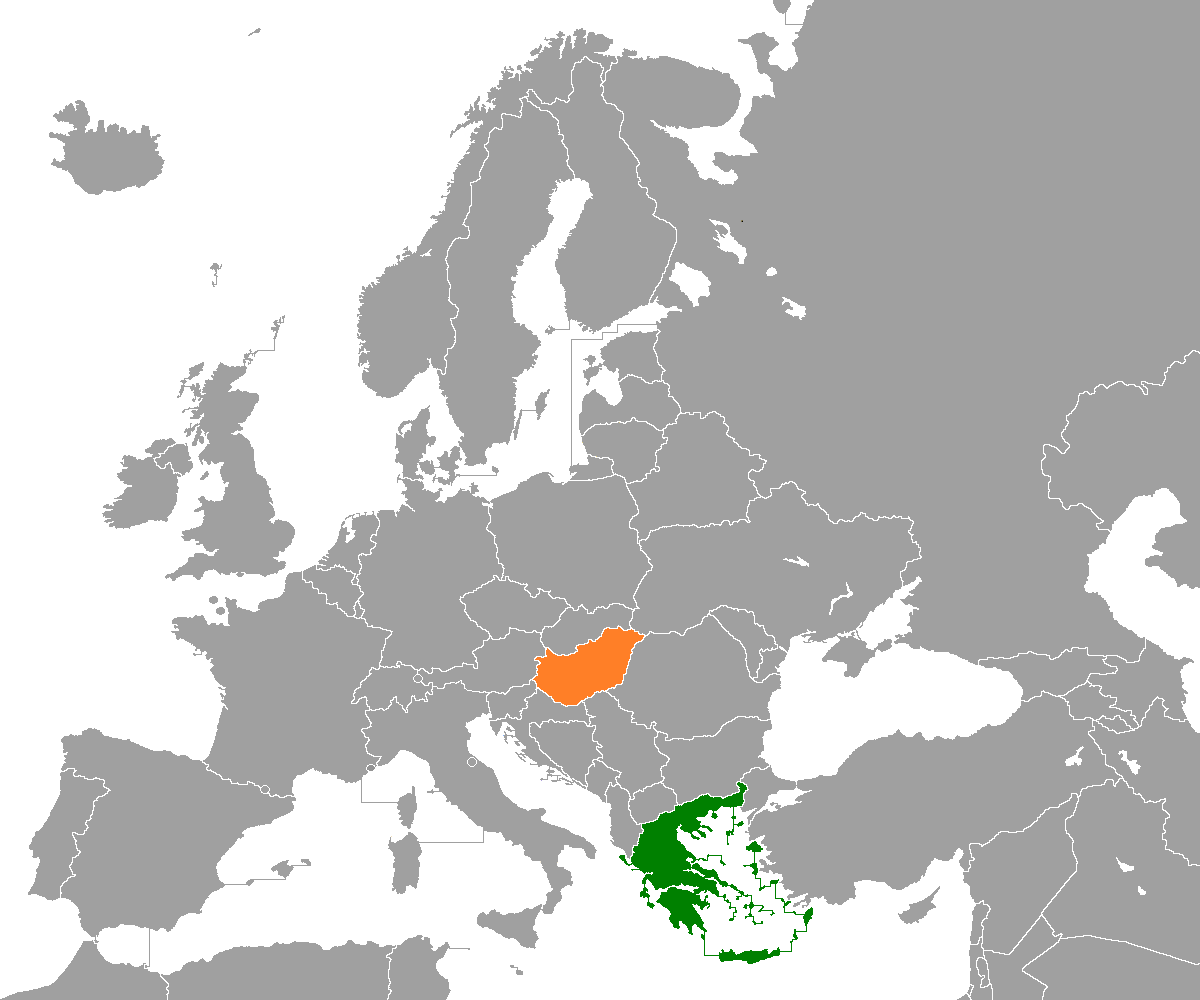

- Greece: Hungary

Greece and Hungary established diplomatic relations on July 7, 1956. Both countries exchanged embassies in the other one's capital on August 24, 1964. Both countries are full members of the European Union, NATO, OECD, OSCE and the Council of Europe. There are around 2,500 people of Greek descent living in Hungary. Meanwhile, there are around 2,000 people of Hungarian descent living in Greece, according to an assessment of 2011.

== Military cooperation ==
A Hungarian military contingent participated in a NATO mission to assist Greece in ensuring security during the 2004 Summer Olympics.

== List of bilateral visits ==
- In April 1998, the President of Greece Konstantinos Stephanopoulos visited Hungary
- In November 2000, the Prime Minister of Greece Kostas Simitis visited Hungary
- In January 2003, the Prime Ministers of Hungary Péter Medgyessy visited Greece
- In September 2003, the President of Hungary Ferenc Mádl visited Greece

== Bilateral agreements ==
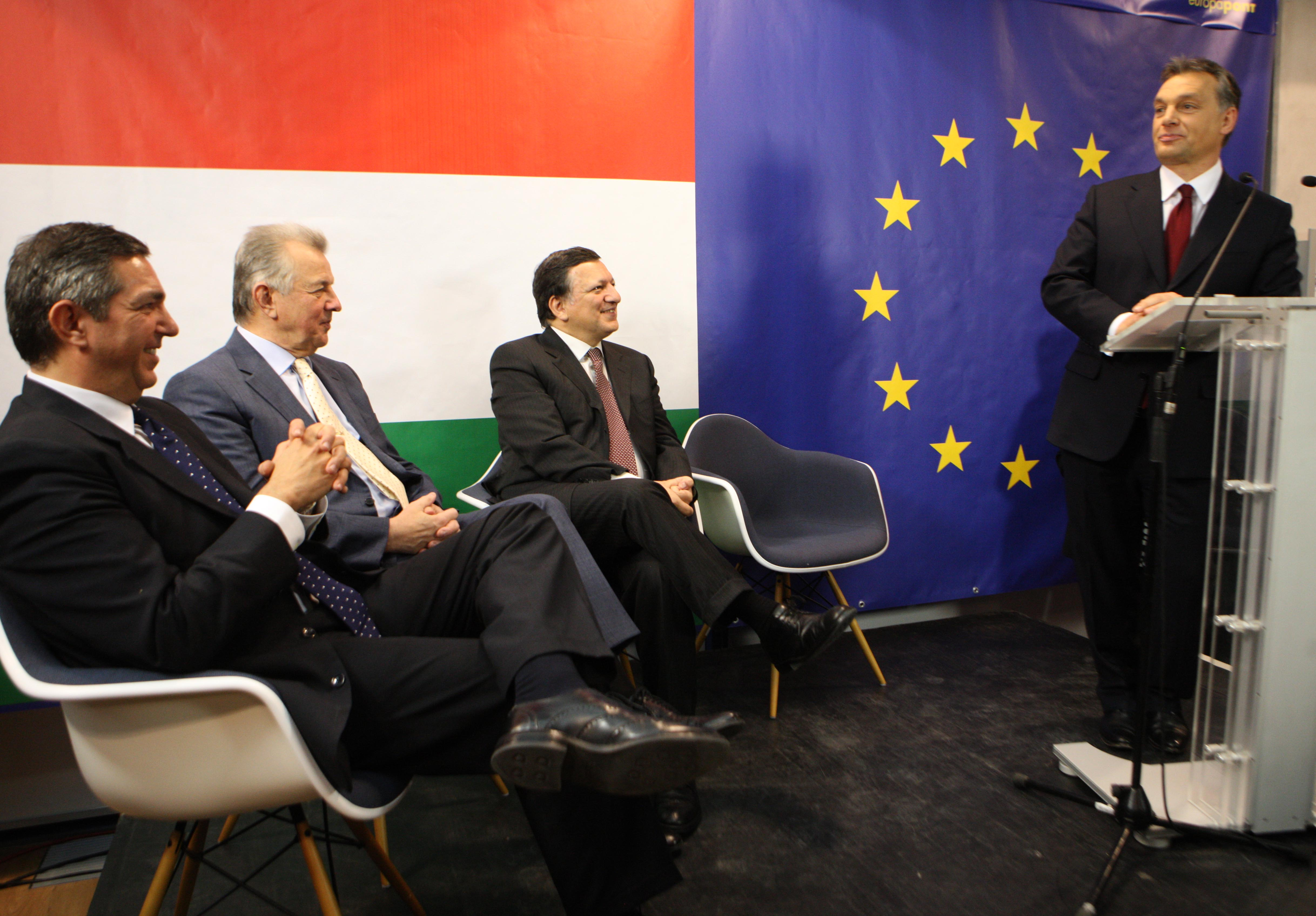
Stavros Lambrinidis and Viktor Orbán in January 2011

- Air Cooperation agreement (1963)
- Agreement on the Avoidance of Double Taxation on Income (1984)
- Agreement on the promotion and Protection of Investments (1989)
- Agreement on Economic, Industrial and Technological Cooperation (1980)
- Agreement on international road transport (1977)
- Tourism Cooperation Agreement (1987)
- Agreement on agricultural cooperation (2001)

== the European Union and NATO ==
Greece joined the EU in 1981. Hungary joined the EU in 2004. Greece joined NATO in 1952. Hungary joined NATO in 1999.

== Resident diplomatic missions ==
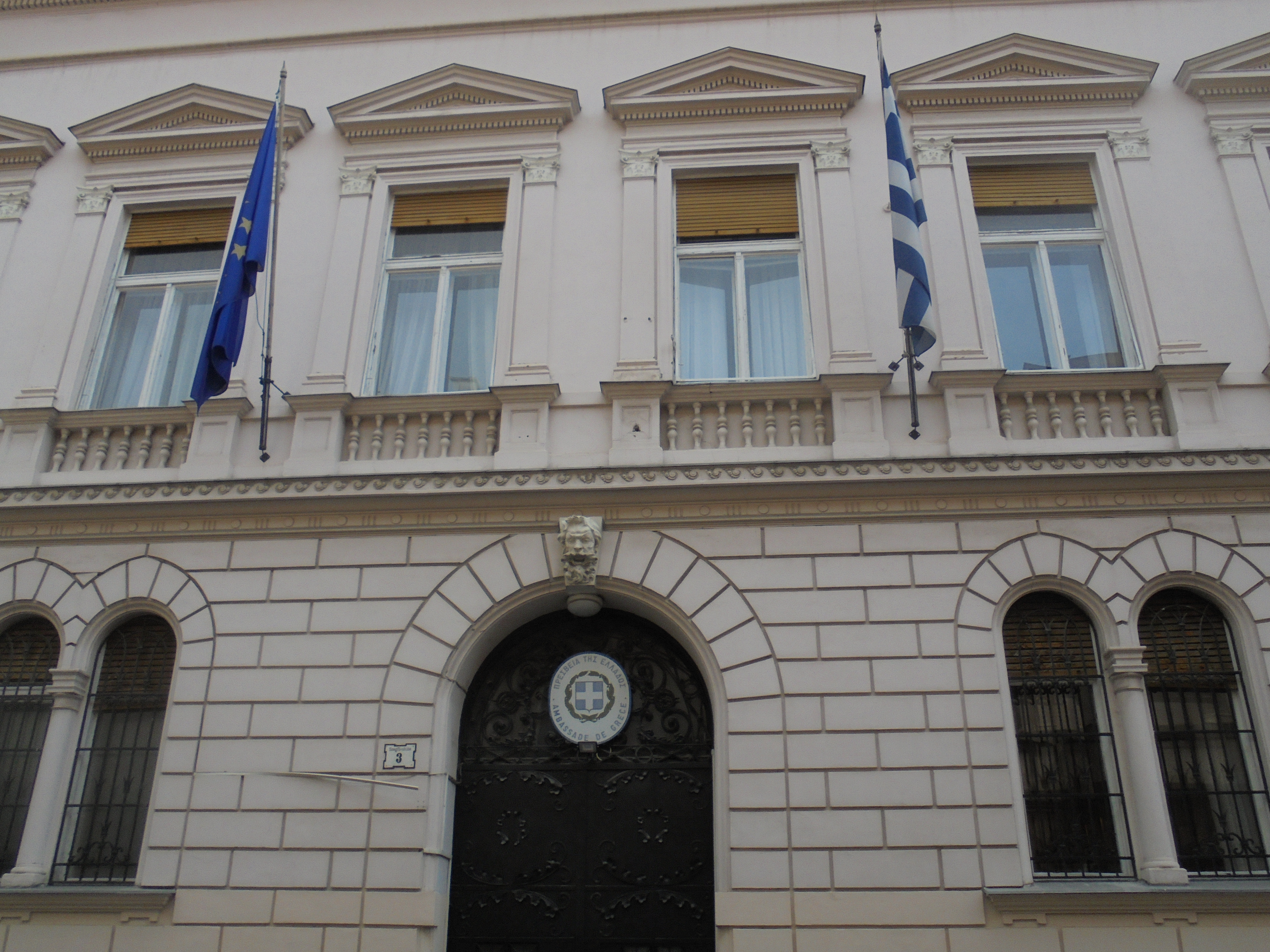
Embassy of Greece in Budapest

- Greece has an embassy in Budapest.
- Hungary has an embassy in Athens.

== See also ==
- Foreign relations of Greece
- Foreign relations of Hungary
- Greeks in Hungary
- Beloiannisz
