= Greeks in Hungary =

Ethnic group

The Greeks in Hungary constitute one of the thirteen officially recognized ethnic minorities in Hungary since The Rights of National and Ethnic Minorities Act was enacted by the Hungarian parliament on July 7, 1993.

Hungarian law recognizes individuals' minority rights, establishes the concept of the collective rights of ethnic minorities, and states the inalienable collective right of minorities to preserve their ethnic identity. The law also permits associations, movements, and political parties of an ethnic or national character and mandates the unrestricted use of ethnic languages. To be recognized, an ethnic group must have at least 100 years' presence in the country, and its members must be citizens.

Hungarians kept close relation with the Byzantine Empire. After the Fall of Constantinople, some Greeks reached Hungary and found refuge in the court of Matthias Corvinus. The earliest migrations of Greeks to the territory of present-day Hungary (as part of the Habsburg monarchy) were noted in the 15th and 16th centuries and consisted primarily of isolated highly educated individuals. Mass migrations did not occur until the 17th century, the largest waves being in 1718 and 1760-1770; they were primarily connected to the economic conditions of the period. During the reign of Joseph II (1780-1790) mass printing of Greek books began in Hungary.

It is estimated that 10,000 Greeks lived in Hungary by the second half of the 18th century. At that point, every single town in Hungary had a Greek population and Greek communities are estimated to have been over 100. Buda and Pest (today Budapest) had the largest concentration of Greeks in the country. In particular, the cities of Kecskemét, Vác, Szentendre and Ráckeve had significant Greek communities.

The Greeks of Budapest originally worshiped in the Serbian church of Agios Georgios, where the liturgy was held in both Serbian and Greek. But later, at the end of the 18th century, about two hundred Macedonian Greeks (most of whom were from Thessaloniki, Serres, Kozani, Siatista and Monastiri) built a Greek Orthodox church, with the permission of the Hungarian rulers, which cost 110,000 forint.

The present-day Greek community consists primarily of political refugees from the Greek Civil War, and numbers 3,916 people, according to the 2011 census. In the village Beloiannisz (Greek: Μπελογιάννης Beloyannis), founded in 1950 by Greek refugees, the mayor is traditionally Greek although the number of Greeks has dwindled to about 300 out of a total population of 1,200.

== See also ==
- Greek people
- Greek diaspora
- Greece–Hungary relations
- Immigration to Hungary
- Hungarians in Greece
