= Austria–Greece relations =

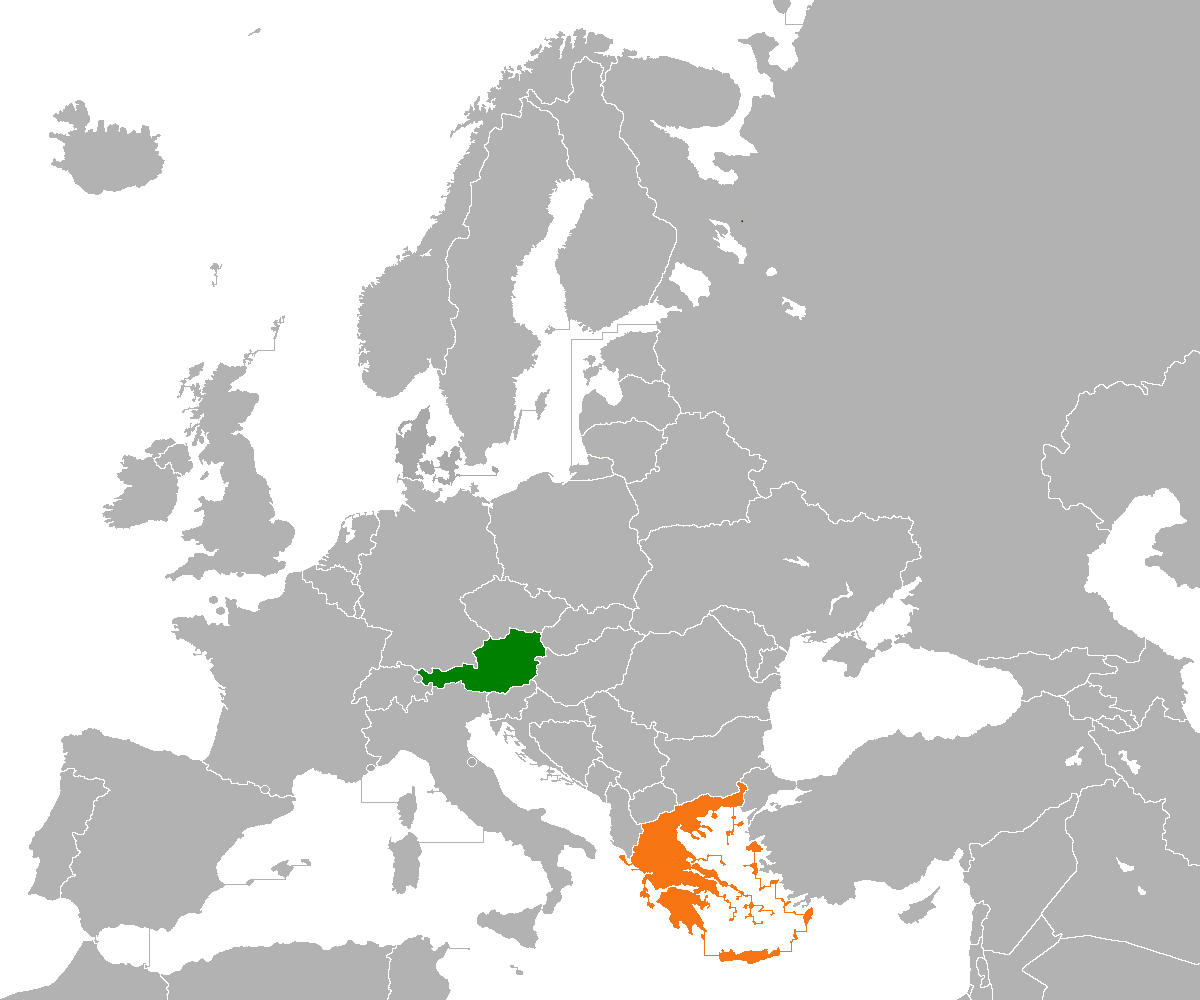
- Austria: Greece

Diplomatic mission
- Embassy of Austria, Athens: Embassy of Greece, Vienna

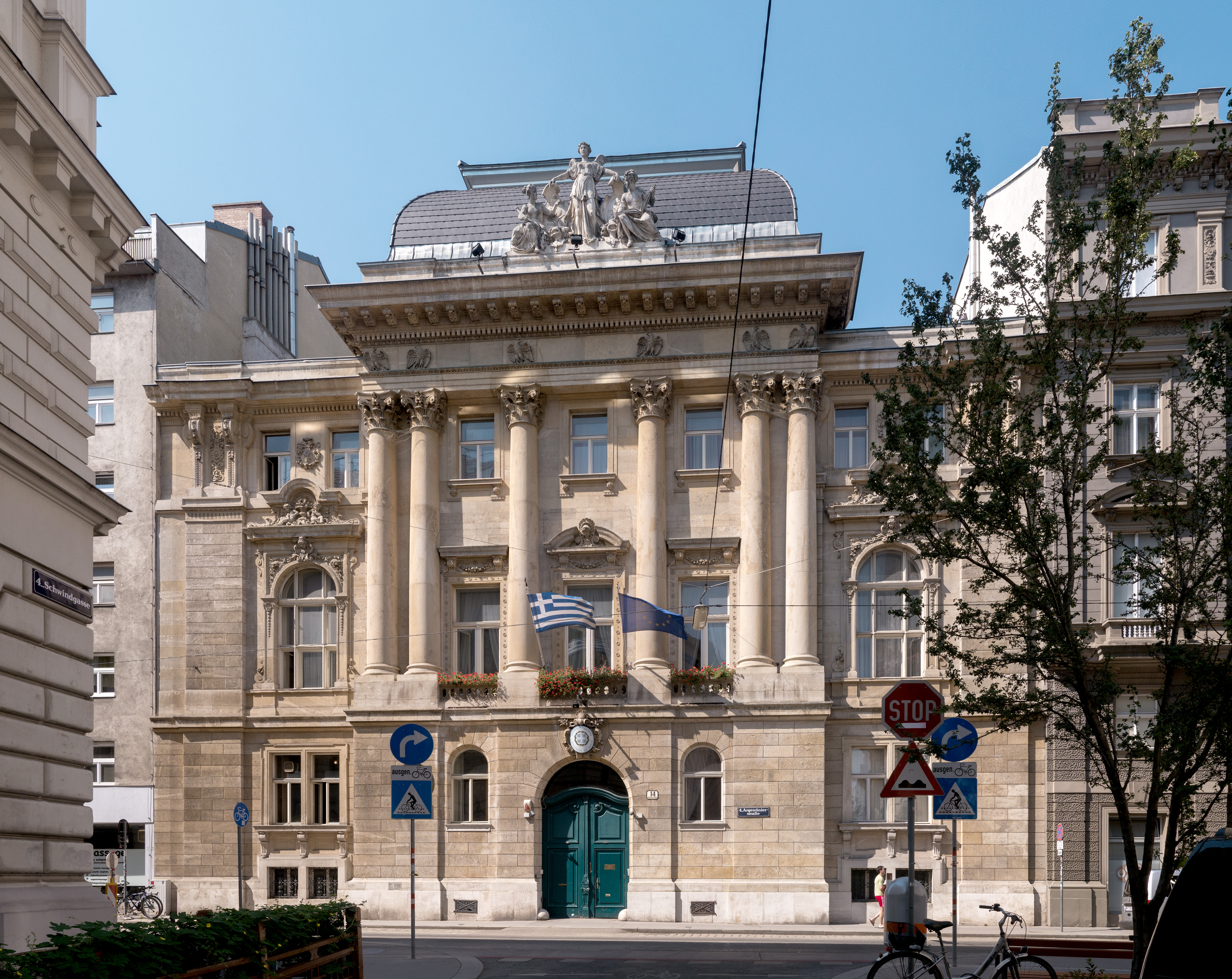
Greek embassy, Vienna

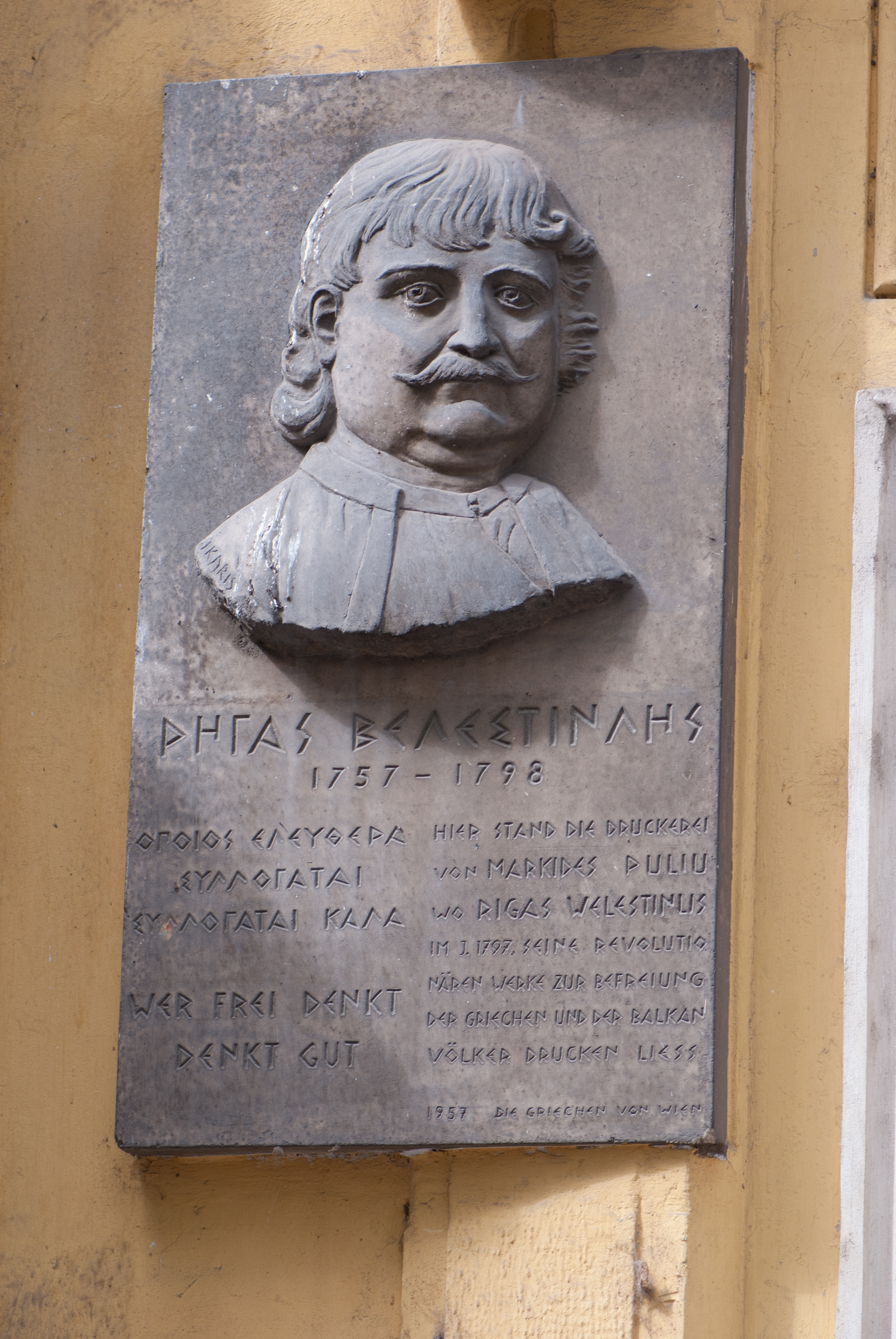
Commemorative plaque for Rigas in Vienna

Foreign relations exist between Austria and Greece. Both countries have diplomatic relations since the early 19th century, after the Greek War of Independence, and today's relations are considered excellent.

Greece has an embassy in Vienna. Austria has an embassy in Athens. There is also a Greek community living in Austria.

== History ==
Since the 17th century, Greek merchants, mostly of the regions of Macedonia and Epirus, were settled in Austria-Hungary and Vienna and made fortunes there. A large part of scholars and intellectuals of the Modern Greek Enlightenment had their base in Vienna. The Austrian government recognized Greek independence in April 1831.

During World War II, some Greeks were imprisoned in subcamps of the Mauthausen concentration camp in German-annexed Austria.

During the Greek debt crisis, Austria was one of the strongest supporters of Greek positions, such as on the refugee crisis. Both countries are full members of the Council of Europe and of the European Union.

== Resident diplomatic mission ==
- Austria has an embassy in Athens.
- Greece has an embassy in Vienna.

== See also ==
- Foreign relations of Austria
- Foreign relations of Greece
