= Theophrastos Georgiadis =

Greek author and teacher

Theophrastos Georgiadis (Greek: Θεόφραστος Γεωργιάδης, 1885-1973) was a Greek author and teacher. His work about the once prosperous urban center of Moscopole, today a small mountain village in southeastern Albania, is considered of great value since it concerns the period before the town's destruction in 1916.

== Life ==
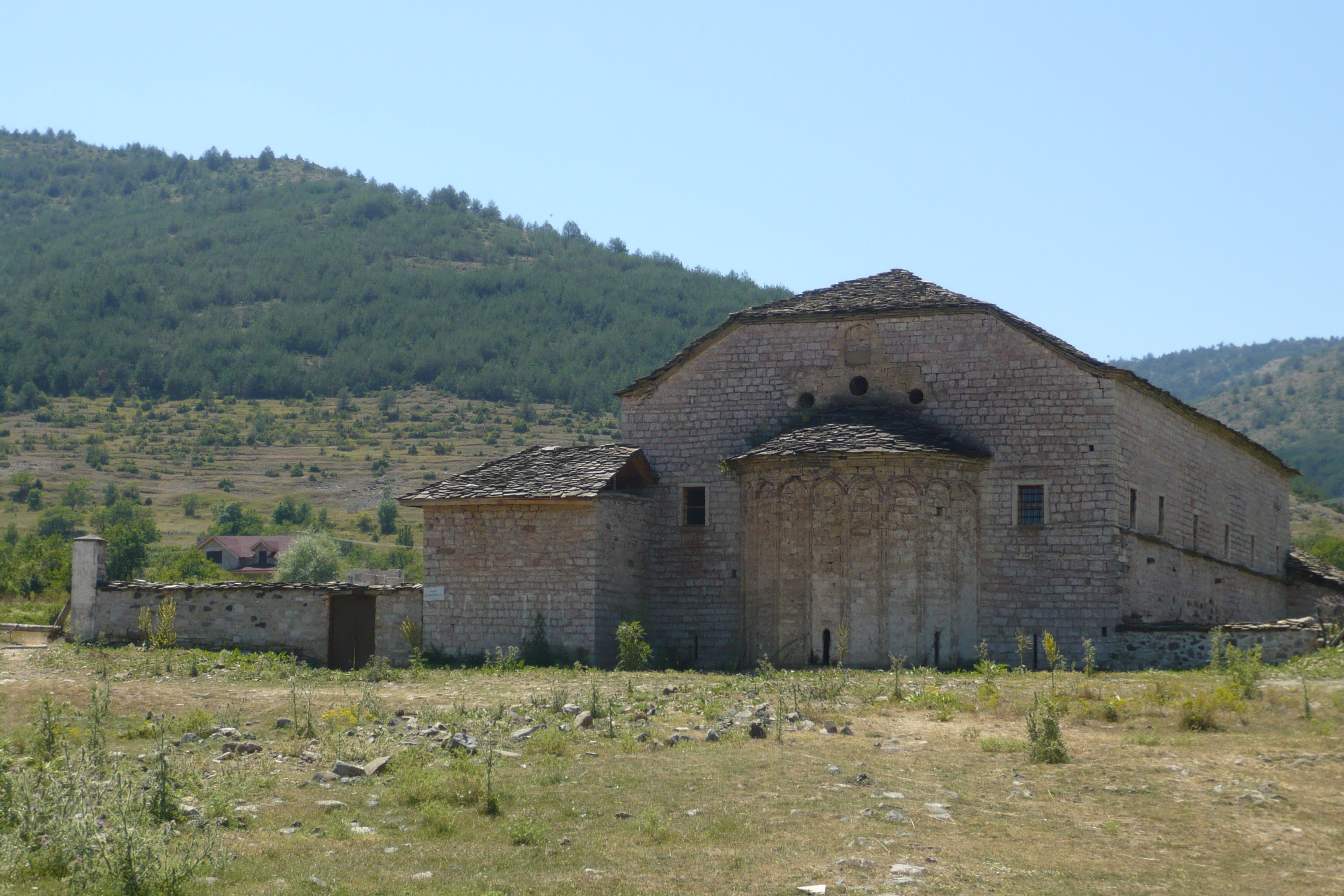
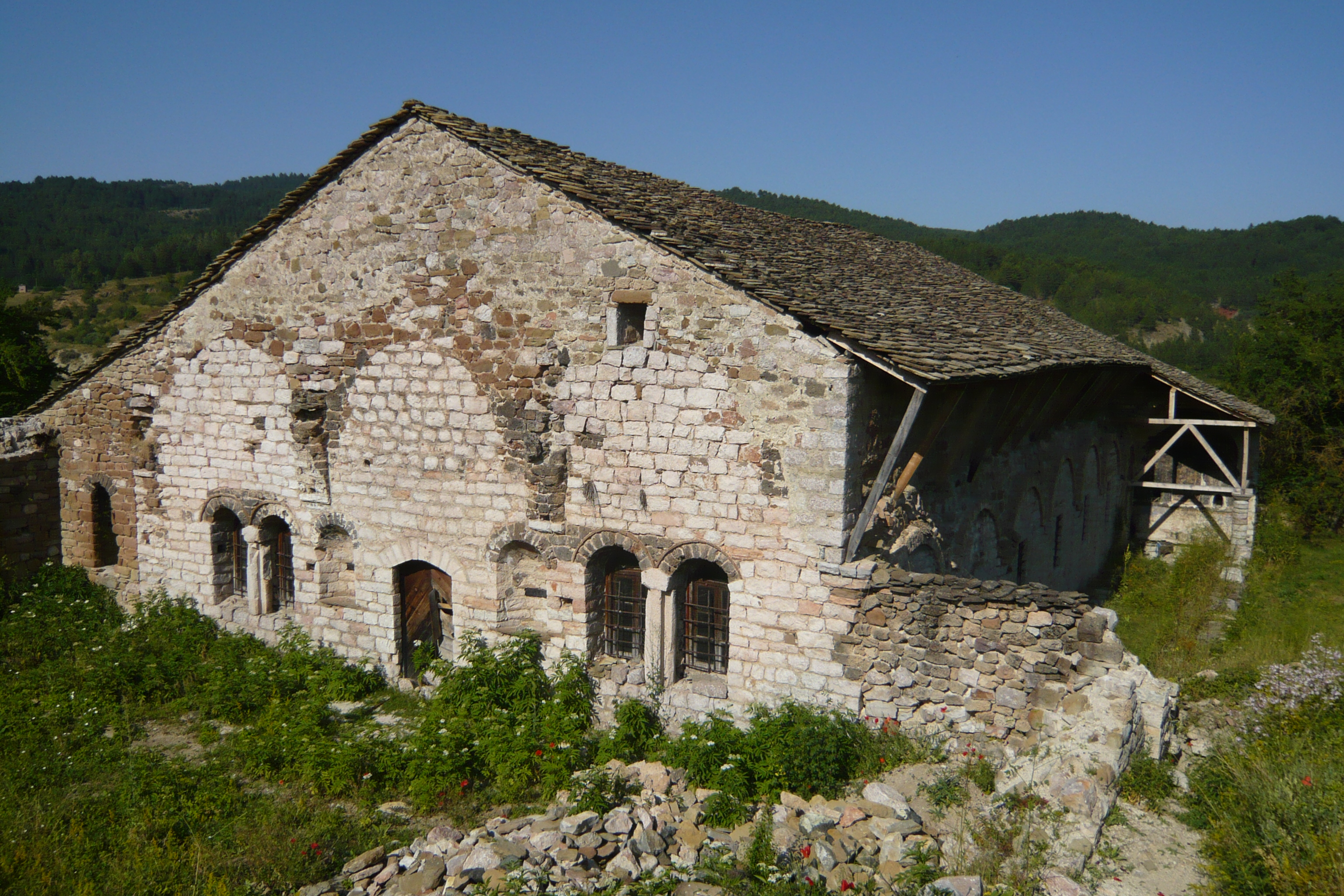
Two of the five surviving churches in Moscopole described by Georgiadis before the 1916 destruction: Church of the Archangels Michael and Gabriel (left), Church of the Holy Virgin (right).

Georgiadis was born in Moscopole, modern Albania, then part of the Ottoman Empire. He was a teacher and director in the local Greek school until 1916. When Moscopole was ravaged by irregular bands during World War I, and most of its cultural buildings were destroyed, he was compelled to leave.

== Work ==
In his volume Moschopolis, first published posthumously in 1975 in Athens, Georgiadis makes brief descriptions of the 22 churches and chapels of Moscopole, from which only 5 survive today. He includes information such as donors' inscriptions of each church, the church registers as well as descriptions of the architectural style and the decoration of each building. For instance, about the Church of the Archangels Michael and Gabriel he mentions that it had two chapels dedicated to Saint Spiridon and Saint Nahum, which are in ruins now. In the Church of the Holy Virgin, notes that a scene of the Apocalypse was depicted in the porch which is now almost completely destroyed. Georgiadis gave also details about several churches that are completely destroyed, such as Saint Euthimios.

== Sources ==
- Kirchhainer, Karin (2003). "Iconographic Characteristics of the Churches in Moschopolis and Vithikuqi (Albania)" (PDF). Makedonika. 35 (4): 163–191.
- Κεκριδής Ευστάθιος (1989), "Θεόδωρος Αναστασίου Καβαλλιώτης (1718; 1789). Ο Διδάσκαλος του Γένους", Aristotle University of Thessaloniki
