= St. Michael Church, Moscopole =

18th-century church in Albania

St. Michael Church
- Kisha e Shën Mëhillit (Albanian); Ιερός Ναός Ταξιαρχών (Greek)
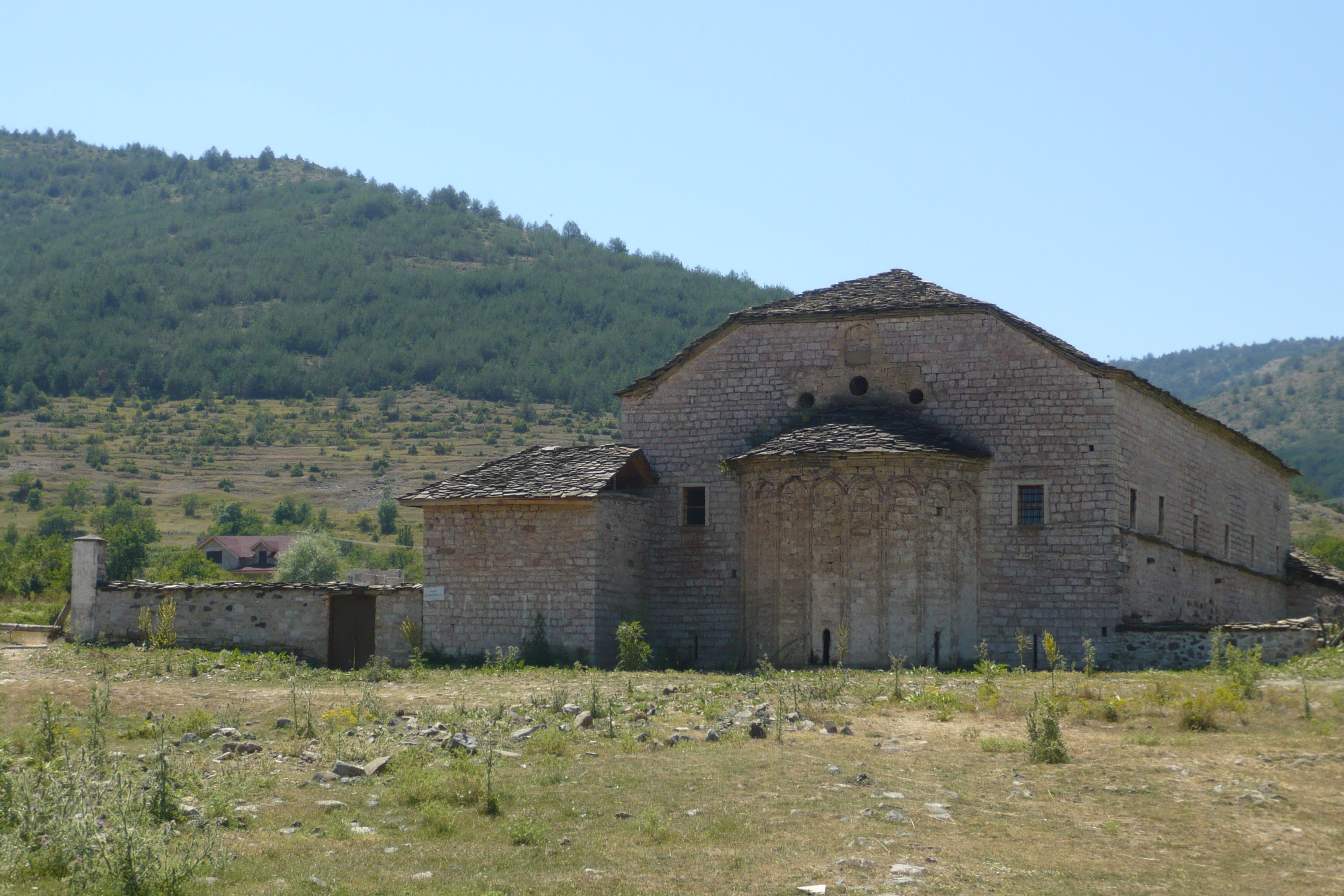
- Interactive map of St. Michael Church
- 40.62904°N 20.58724°E
- Location: Voskopojë

Cultural Monument of Albania

The St. Michael Church (Albanian: Kisha e Shën Mëhillit or Kisha Kryeengjëjt Mihail dhe Gavriil, also known as Church of the Archangels Michael and Gabriel is an Eastern Orthodox church in Voskopojë, modern southeastern Albania.

== History ==
The church was erected in 1722 and is one out of five remaining churches in the once prosperous metropolis of Moscopole.

During the prohibition of religion in Albania, in 1948, it was turned to a cultural monument of the state. In 1996 the church became a target of vandalism by Muslim fanatics with 23 paintings of Saints being heavily damaged.

== Architecture ==
It is a basilica-type church with a main nave and two lateral aisles. The dimensions are 33m x 15m x 9m. There are two main pillars. Two lines of columns divide the central nave from the two lateral aisles and all three aisles have the same height as the naos. The columns are connected among one another on both directions. Each one of the three aisles has a cupola, and each one of the three cupolas is different. On the eastern side the apse is outside of the cupola and some pillars cover it. The narthex is on the western side, and its construction is similar to the remaining part of the naos. The narthex has stone columns with arches and cupolas. The cloister is absent as it has been destroyed, but there are still signs of the original one.
