= St. Mary's Church, Voskopojë =

17th-century church in Albania

St. Mary's Church
- Kisha e Shën Mërisë (Albanian); Biserica Stã Mãria (Aromanian)
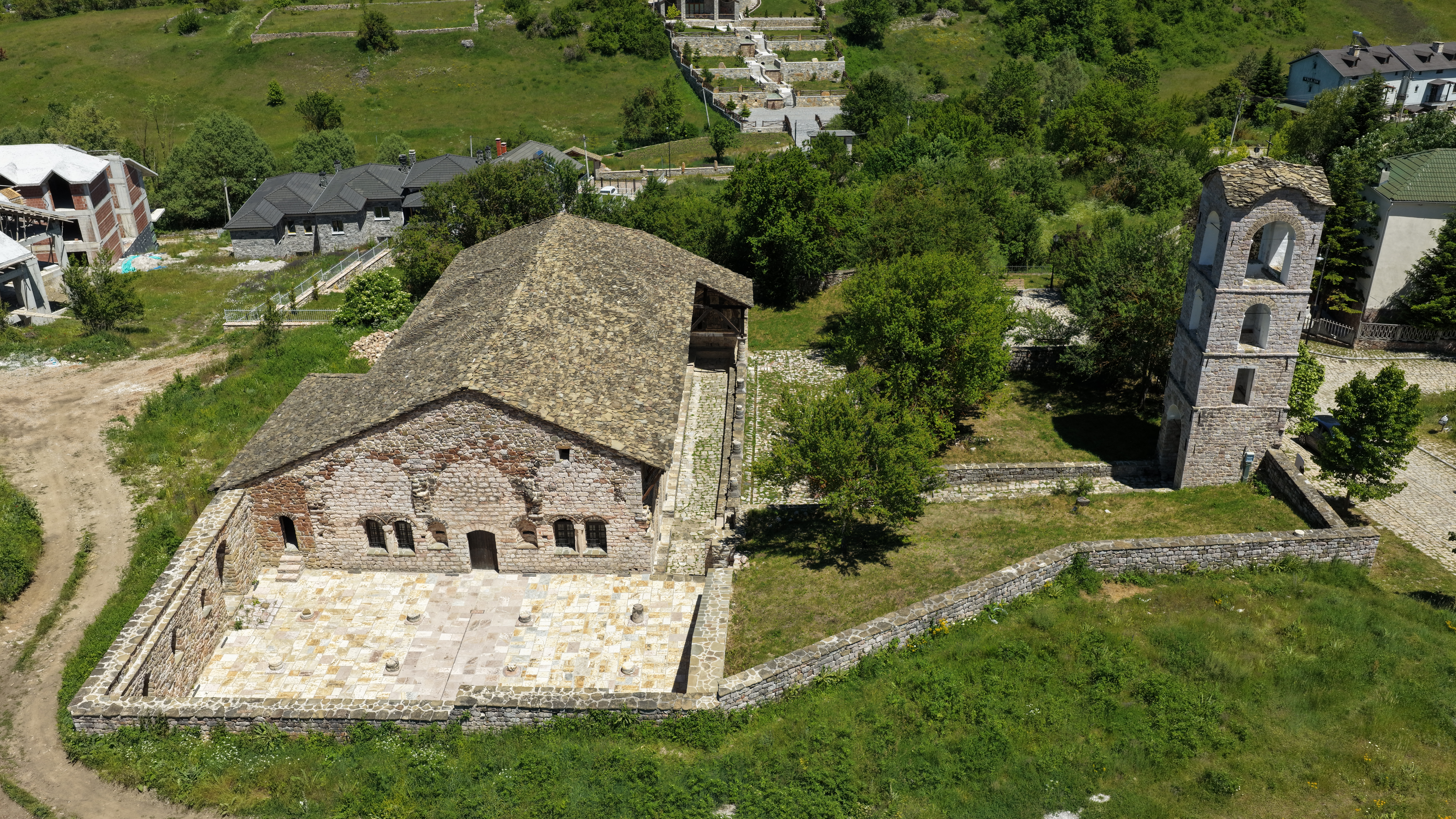
- Interactive map of St. Mary's Church
- 40.63521°N 20.59143°E
- Location: Voskopojë

Cultural Monument of Albania

St. Mary's Church (Albanian: Kisha e Shën Marisë; Aromanian: Biserica Stã Mãria), also known as Dormition of the Holy Virgin Church) is an Orthodox church in Voskopojë, Korçë County, Albania. It is a Cultural Monument of Albania. The church was probably built between 1694 and 1699, and decorated in 1712.

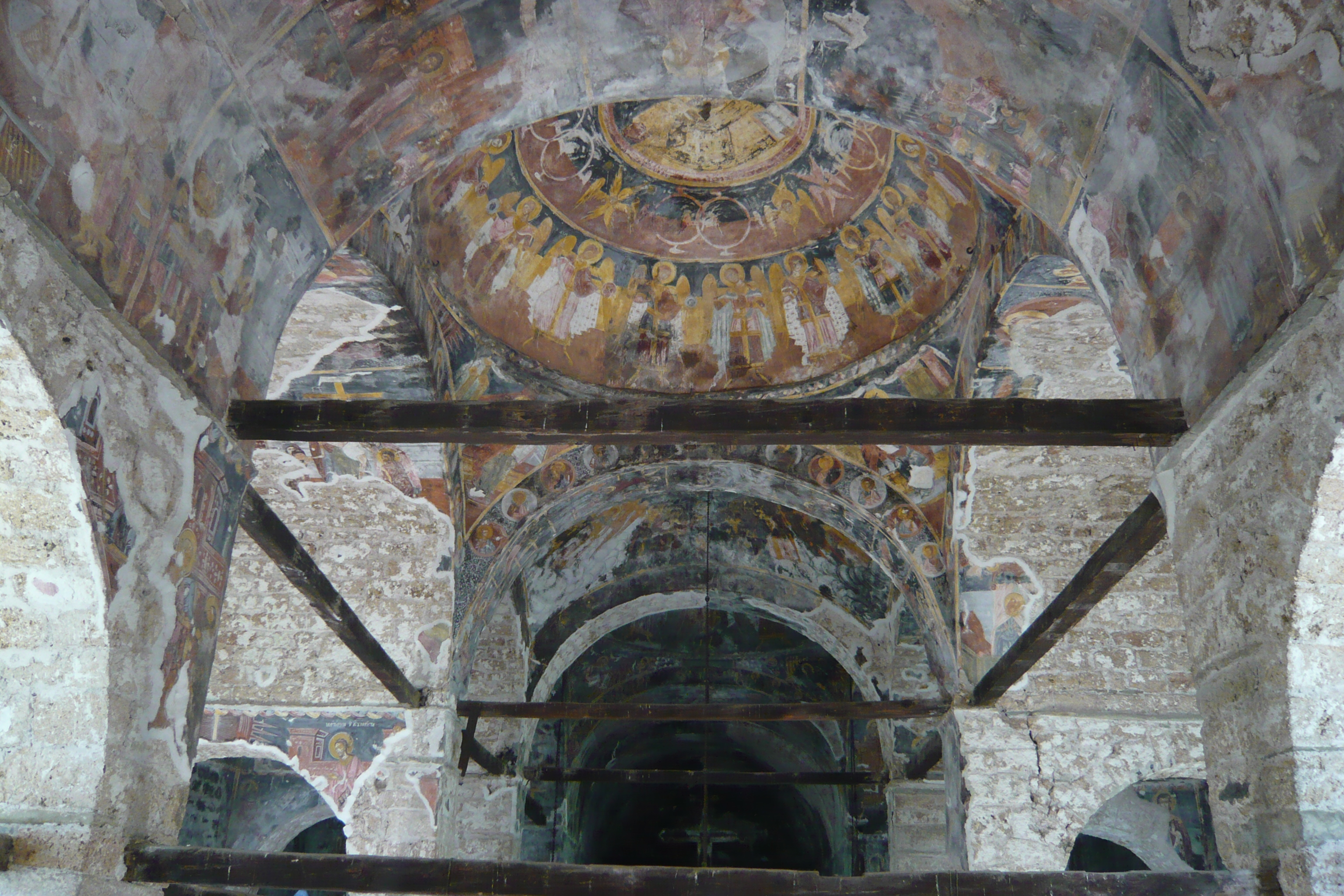
Interior decorations of St. Mary's Church
