= Florian Vika =

Florian Vika is an Albanian contemporary painter and visual artist from Tirana. He was graduated in the Academy of Fine Arts, Florence, Italy in 2004. His art conception is based in the reconstruction of the new values lost from ancient art which remains in every time and sharing those with post modern ones created from Picasso. This way of creating by Florian was appreciated from the Italian professors of Accademia di Belle Arti di Firenze.

== Exhibition ==
- 2005- National Art Gallery of Albania exhibition named Finissage with Lora Arbana.
- 2007- National Art Gallery of Albania participates in Onufri '07, in its fourteenth edition.
- 2009- Accademia di Belle Arti di Firenze A professional discussing in public about his artistic way of creating paintings.

== See also ==
- Modern Albanian art
