= Landmarks in Tirana =

Overview of the landmarks in the Albanian city of Tirana

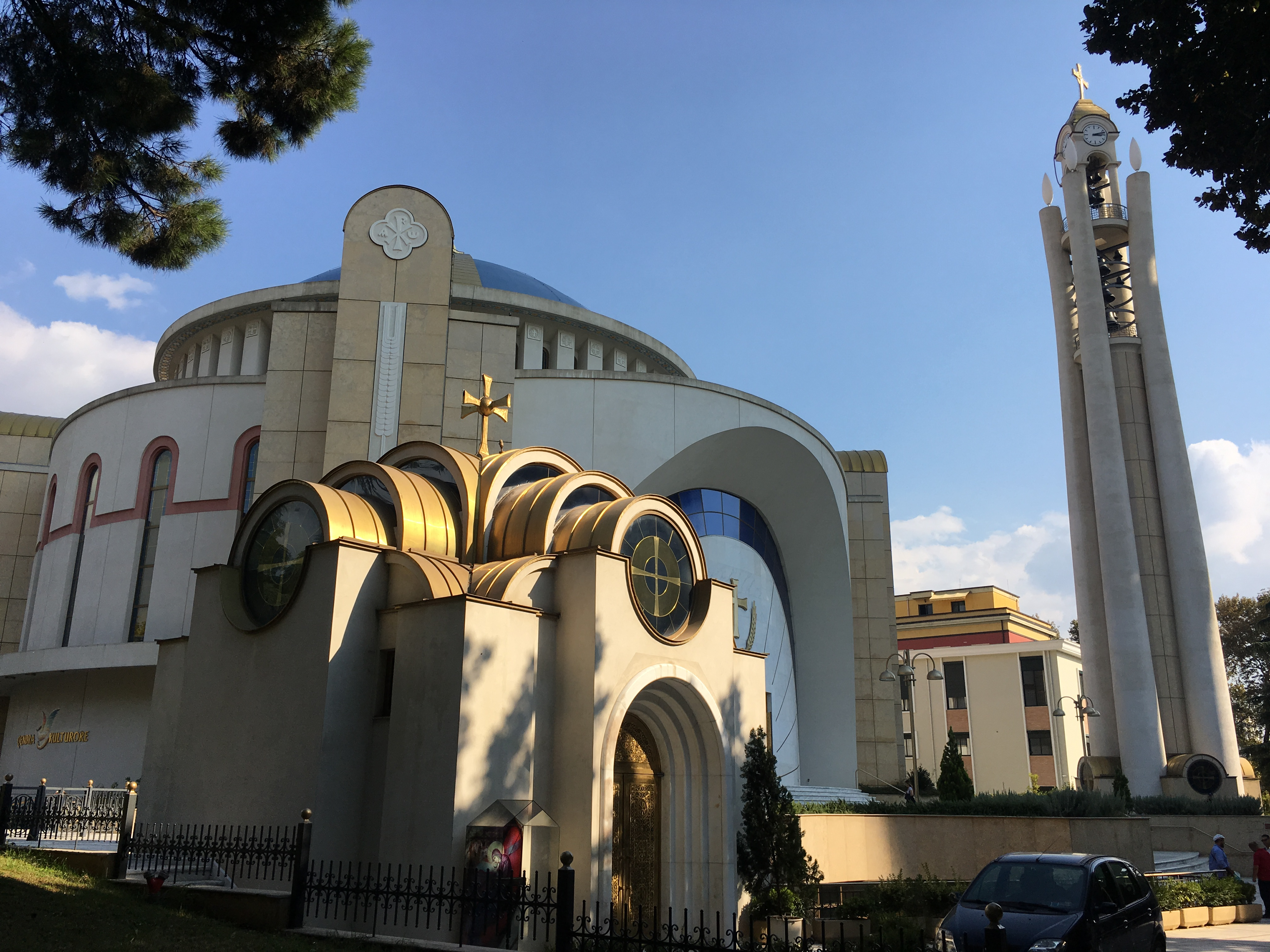
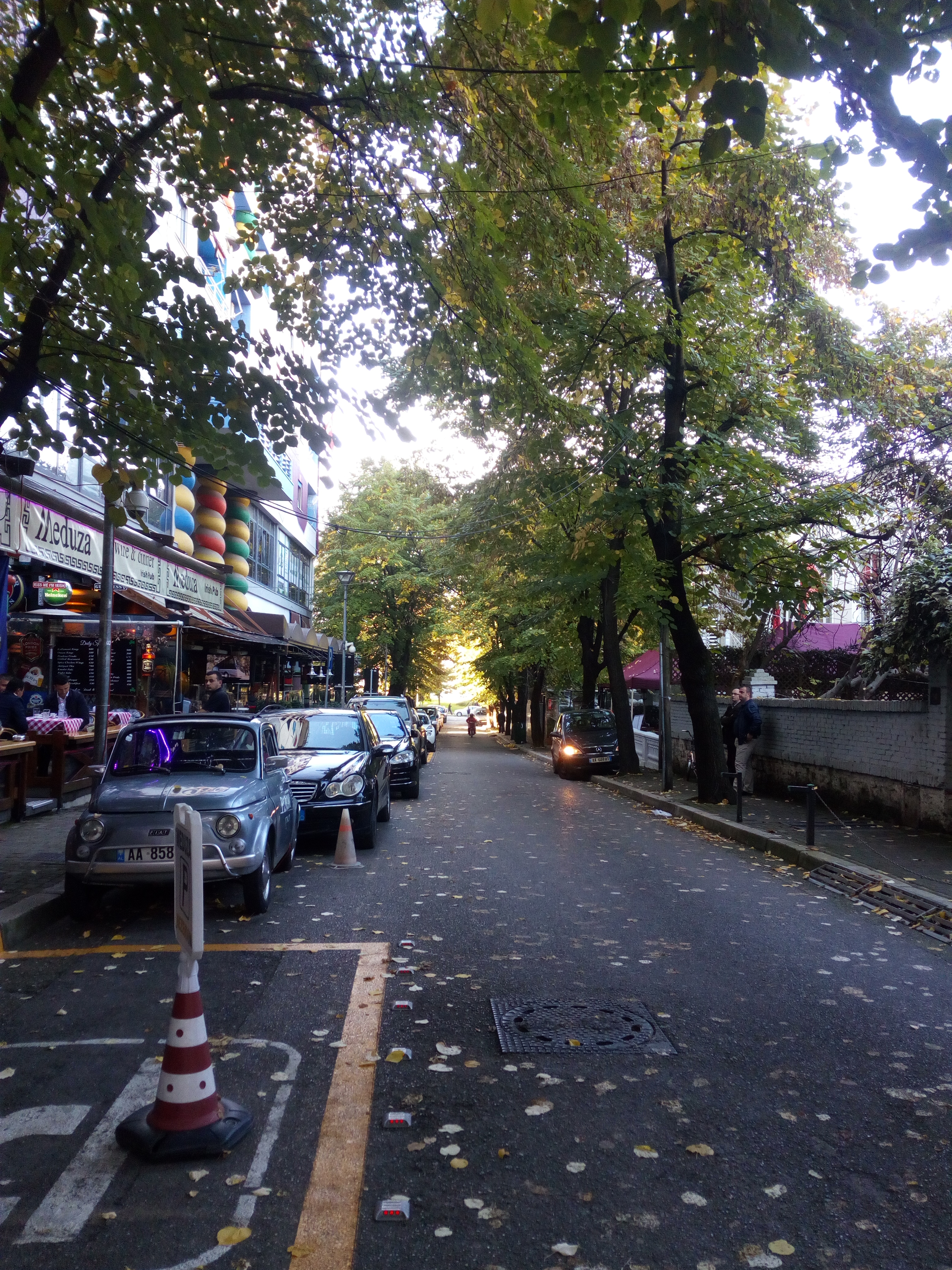
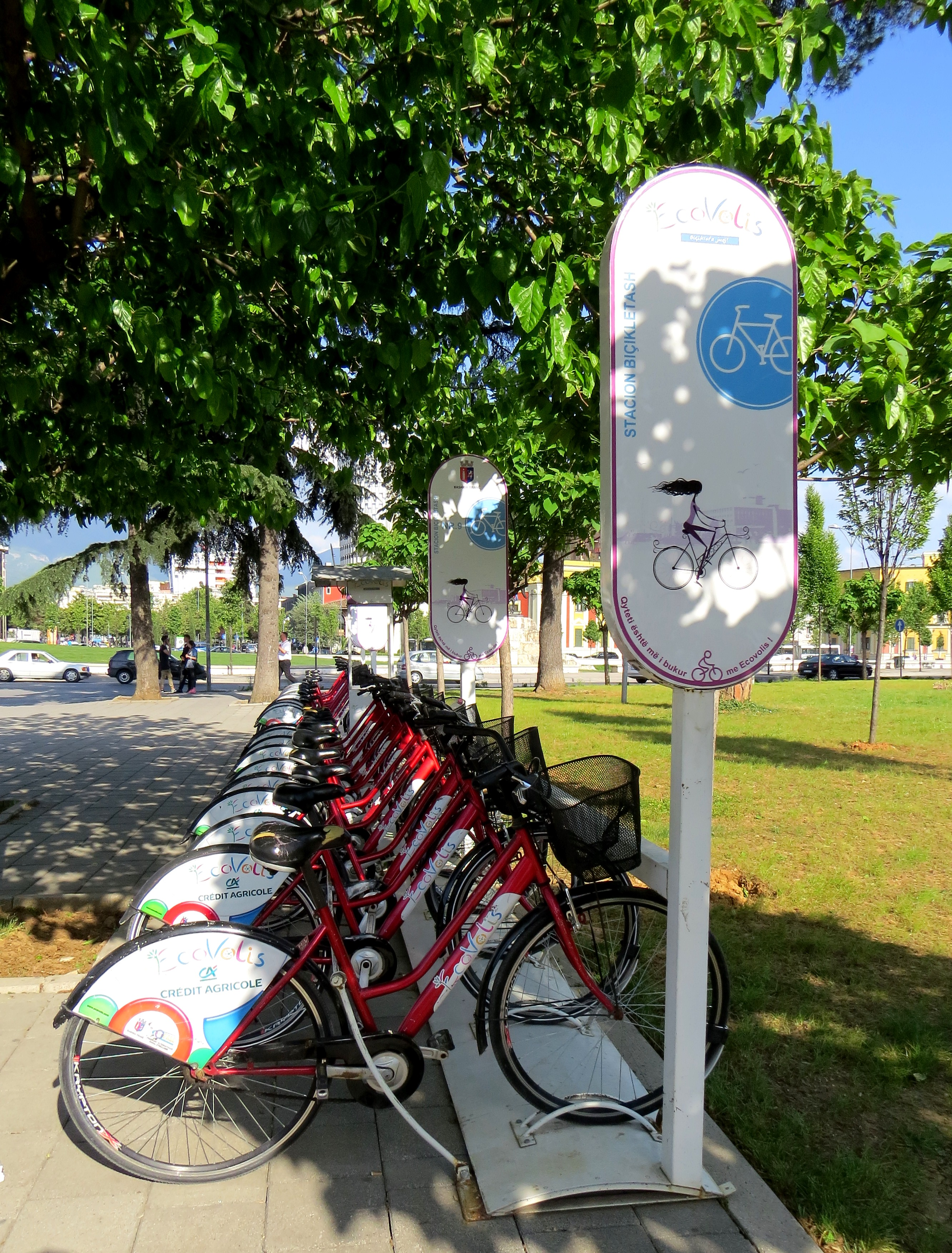
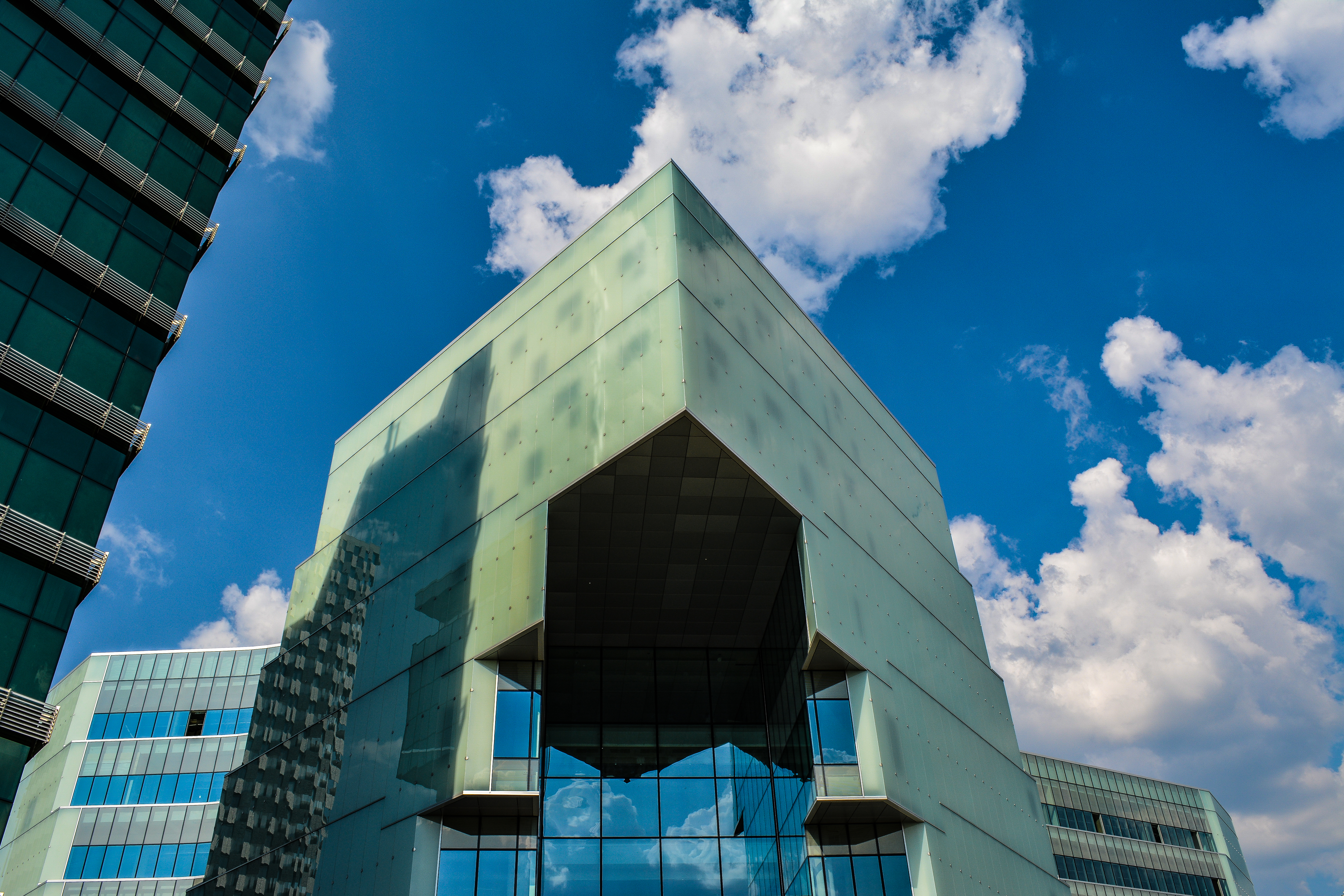
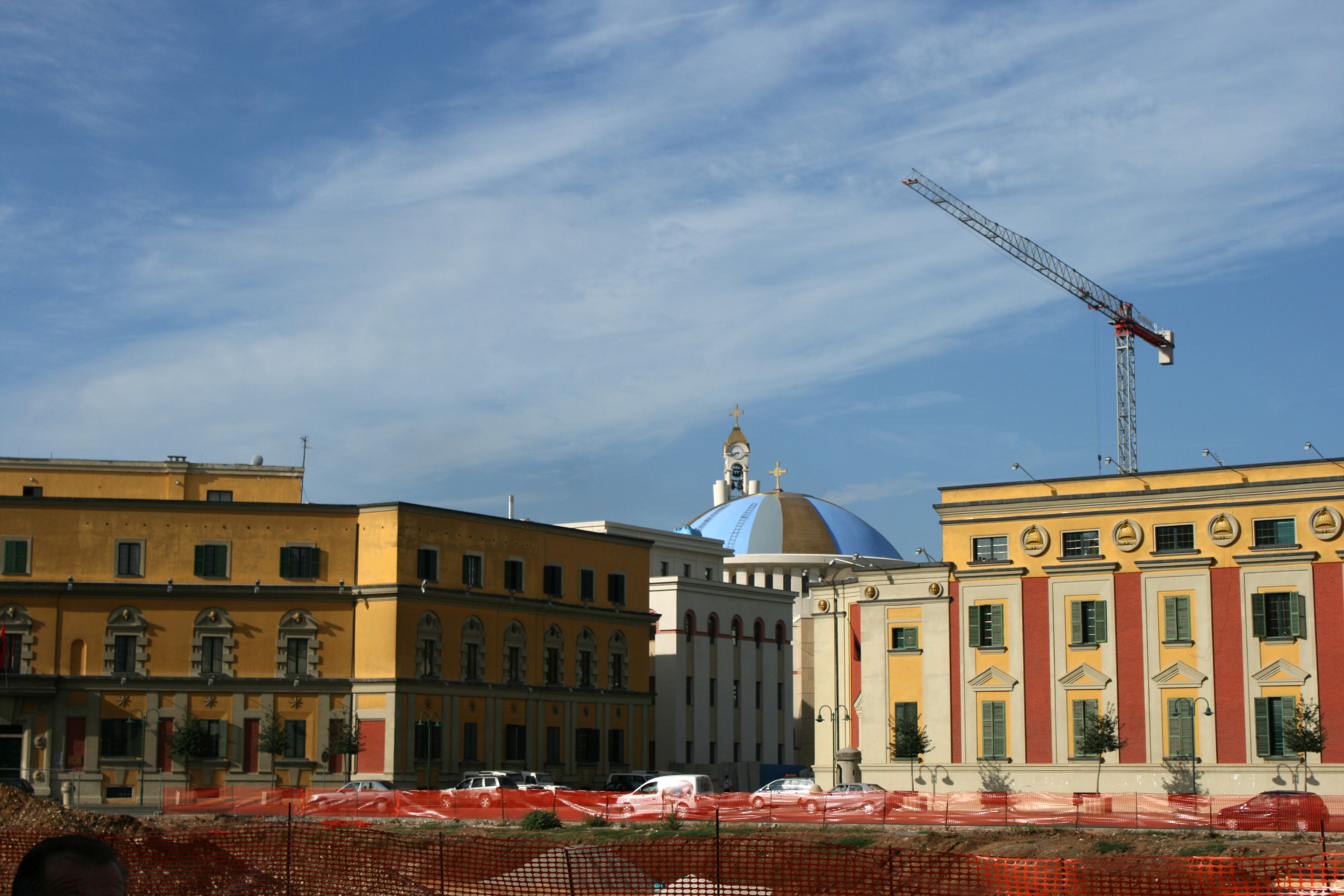
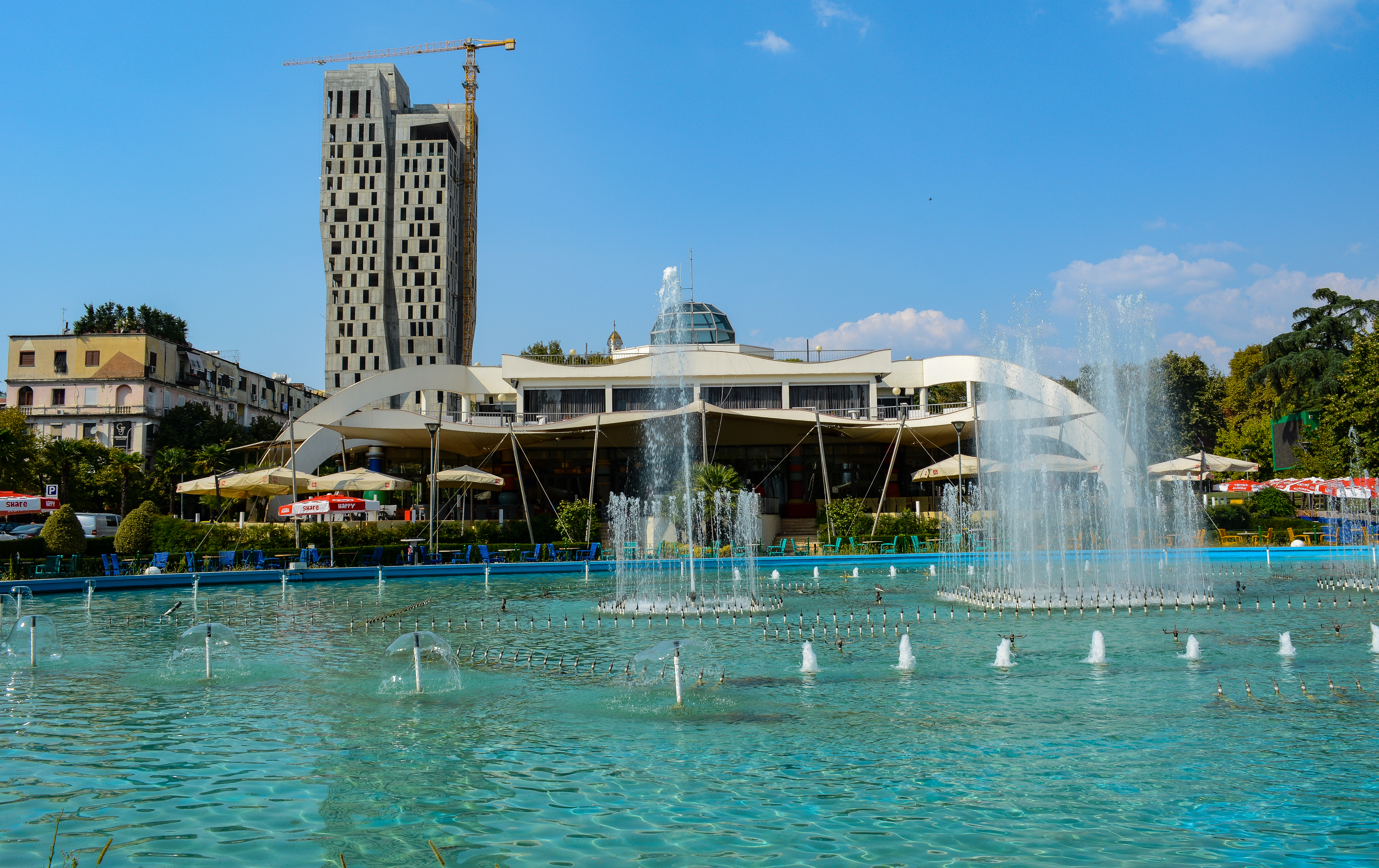
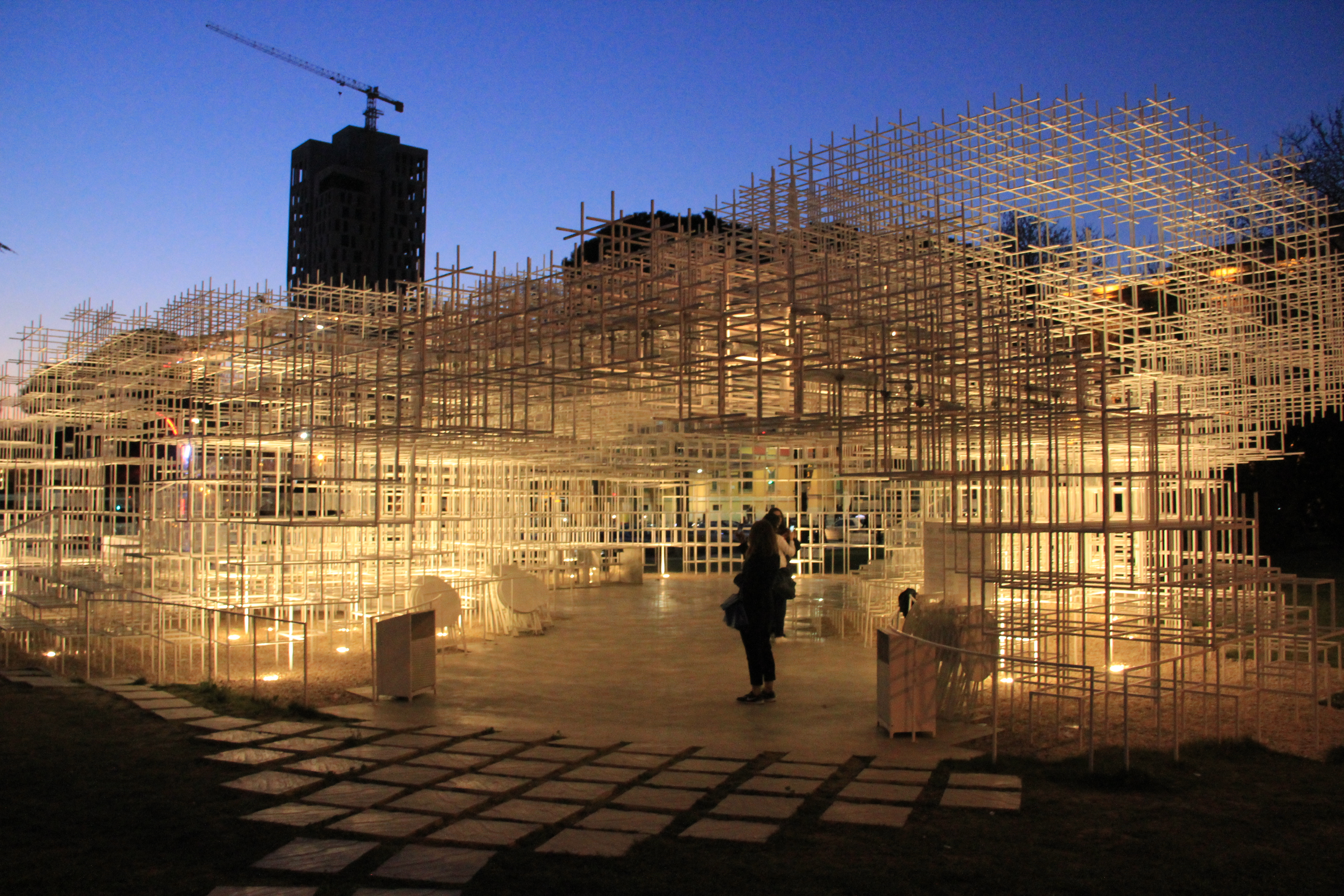
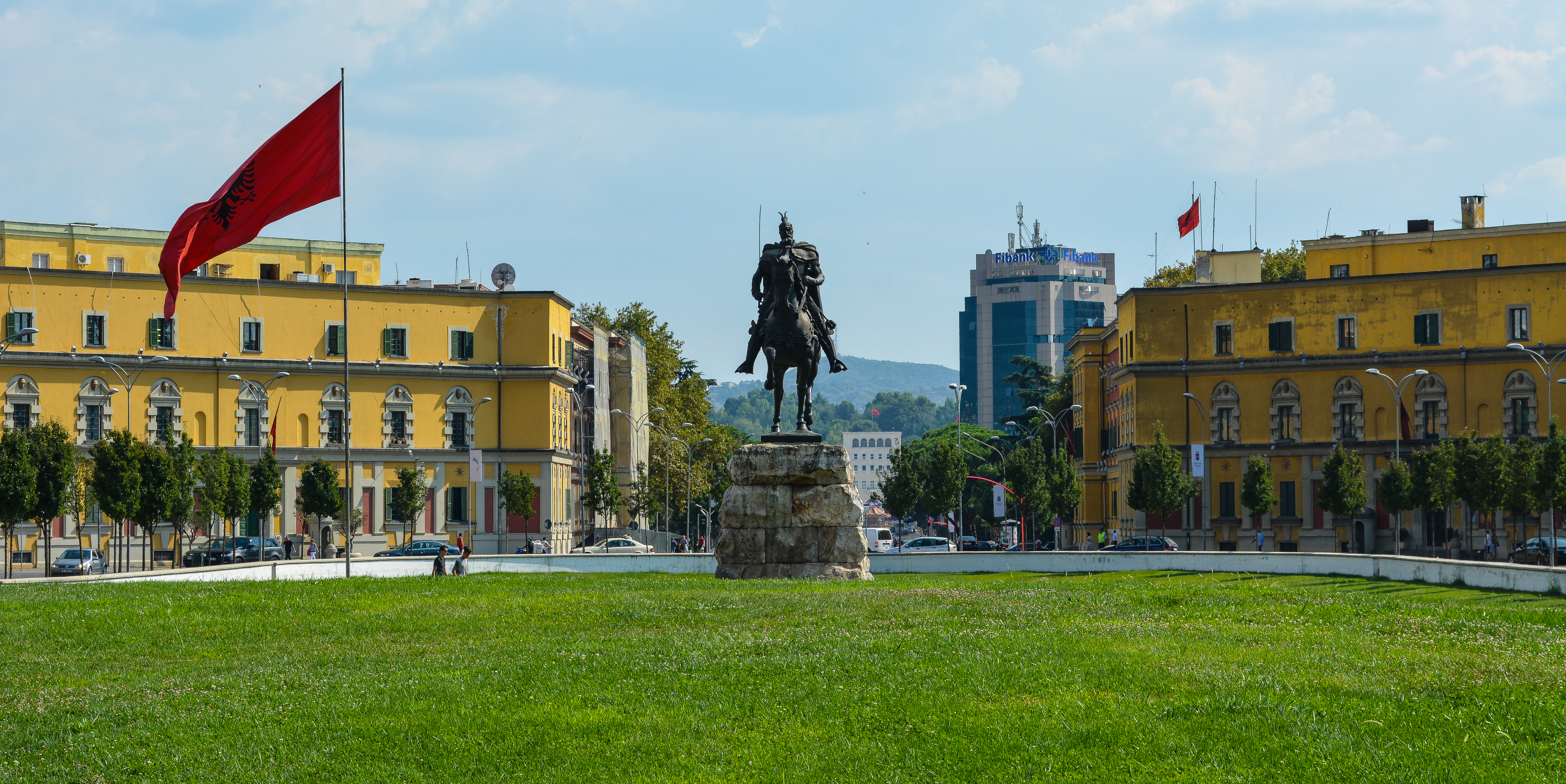
The city of Tirana and some of its landmarks.

There are many landmarks in Tirana, Albania some of which are of considerable historical or artistic interest. Many monuments and landmarks situated in Tirana, date back to the Illyrian, Roman, Greek and Ottoman periods.

Tirana is home to different architectural styles that represent influential periods in its history dating back to antiquity.

== Museums ==
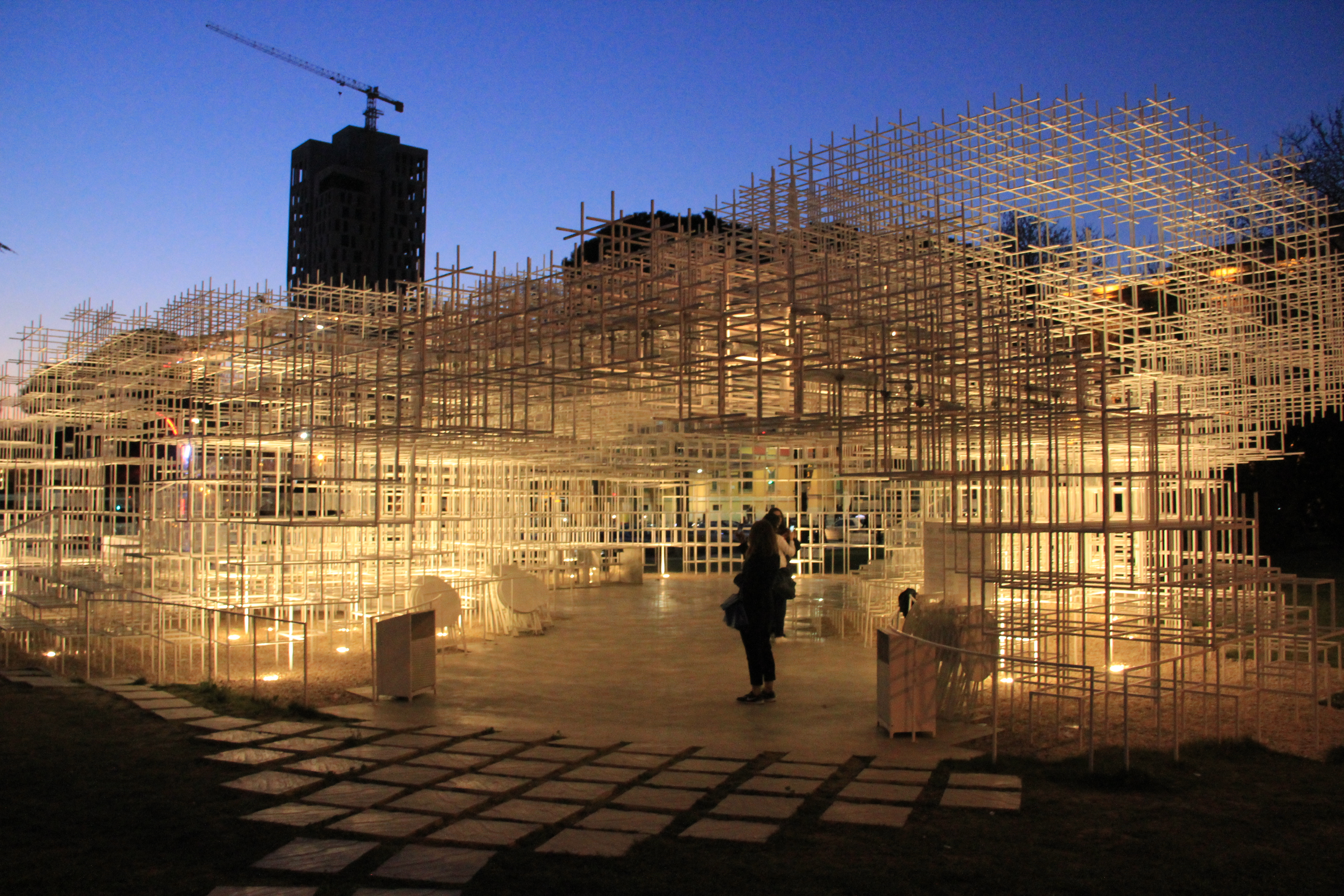
Cloud Pavilion outside the National Art Gallery

=== National Art Gallery ===
The National Art Gallery of Albania was opened to the public on 11 January 1954. The museum preserves over 5000 artworks. Besides the permanent collection which is focused on Socialist Realism art, famous Albanian artists, international ones and important collections have been part of the different exhibitions in the National Gallery of Arts.

=== National Archaeological Museum ===
The National Archaeological Museum is the first museum founded after the World War II in Albania. In the beginning, it was opened in 1948 as a Ethnographic-Archeological Museum. Its artifacts cover a period of more than 5,000 years, from Prehistoric age through Ancient Illyrians, Greeks, the Middle Ages up to Modern times. The museum is divided into five sections, which contains various exhibitions collected from all over the country. In the first and second department, objects from the prehistory are available. The third department, extant objects from the 4th and 6th century AD, that shows the everyday life of the Illyrians and their trade with Greek colonies. In the fourth department, there are statues and sculptures from the classical antiquity, as well as objects from Dyrrachium, Apollonia and Oricum. In the fifth department, there are numerous objects from fortresses and graves, which date from the early and late Middle Ages.

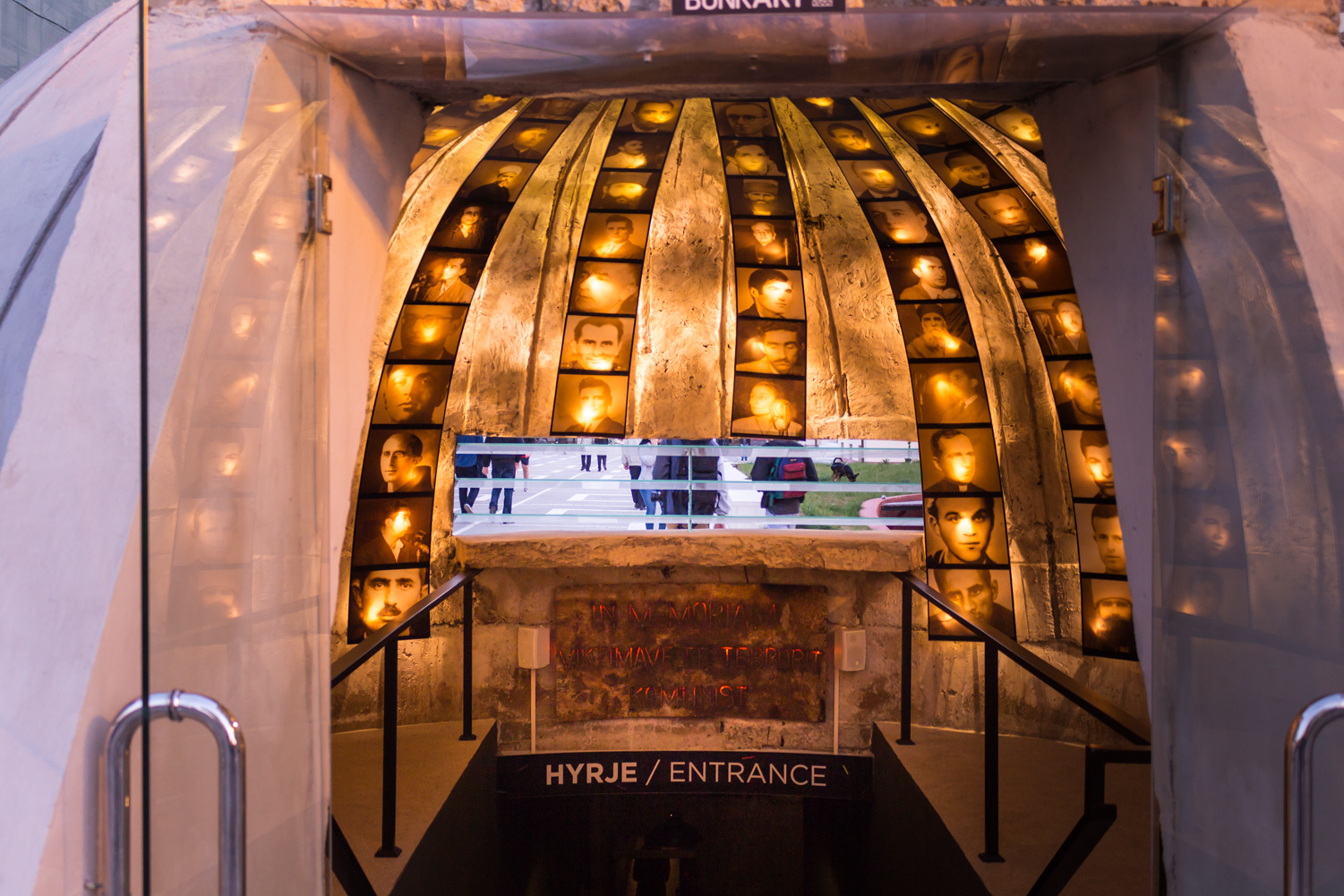
The entrance of the Bunk'art Museum

=== Bunk'art Museum ===
In 1983, approximately 173,371 concrete bunkers were scattered throughout the country under the Communism. The Bunk'art Museum is situated inside an atomic bunker of the dictator Enver Hoxha, near the Deshmoret e Kombit Boulevard. It is dedicated to the Communism in Albania and to the daily lives of Albanians during the regime. It also hosts exhibitions that combine the modern history of the nation with contemporary art.

=== National Historical Museum ===
The National Historical Museum was opened on 28 October 1981 and is 27,000 square metres (290,000 square feet) in size, while 18,000 square metres (190,000 square feet) are available for exhibitions. It keeps some of the best archeological finds in Albania, dating from Prehistory to the Ottoman period. In the stands of the pavilion there are photos of global personalities who met Mother Teresa as Jacques Chirac, Bill Clinton, Tony Blair, Ibrahim Kodra and others. Undoubtedly, the personal objects used by her increase the curiosity of thousands of visitors in the National History Museum. There are richly decorated robes of the Albanian rulers or things specific to historical events, emblems of Albanian princes, the cathedral pillars, reliefs, icons created by the greatest Albanian artists and many other attractions of Albanian history.

The building encloses the Skanderbeg square in the north-west. The façade is characterized by a large mosaic named The Albanians. The mosaic interprets the history of the Albanians, from the antiquity up to the modern period, as an ongoing struggle against everything. The figures are shown from the left, Illyrian warriors, warriors against the Ottoman Empire, Naim Frashëri, fighters from the National Renaissance, a communist worker, Mother Albania in form of a young woman in a crowd with a gun as the central figure of the composition and five communist partisans of both sexes from the Second World War on the right.

=== House of Leaves ===
The House of Leaves, also called the Museum of Secret Surveillance, is a historical museum dedicated to mass surveillance during communism in Albania. It is located in the old headquarters of the Albanian secret police during the communist era (the Sigurimi).

== Squares ==
=== Mother Teresa Square ===
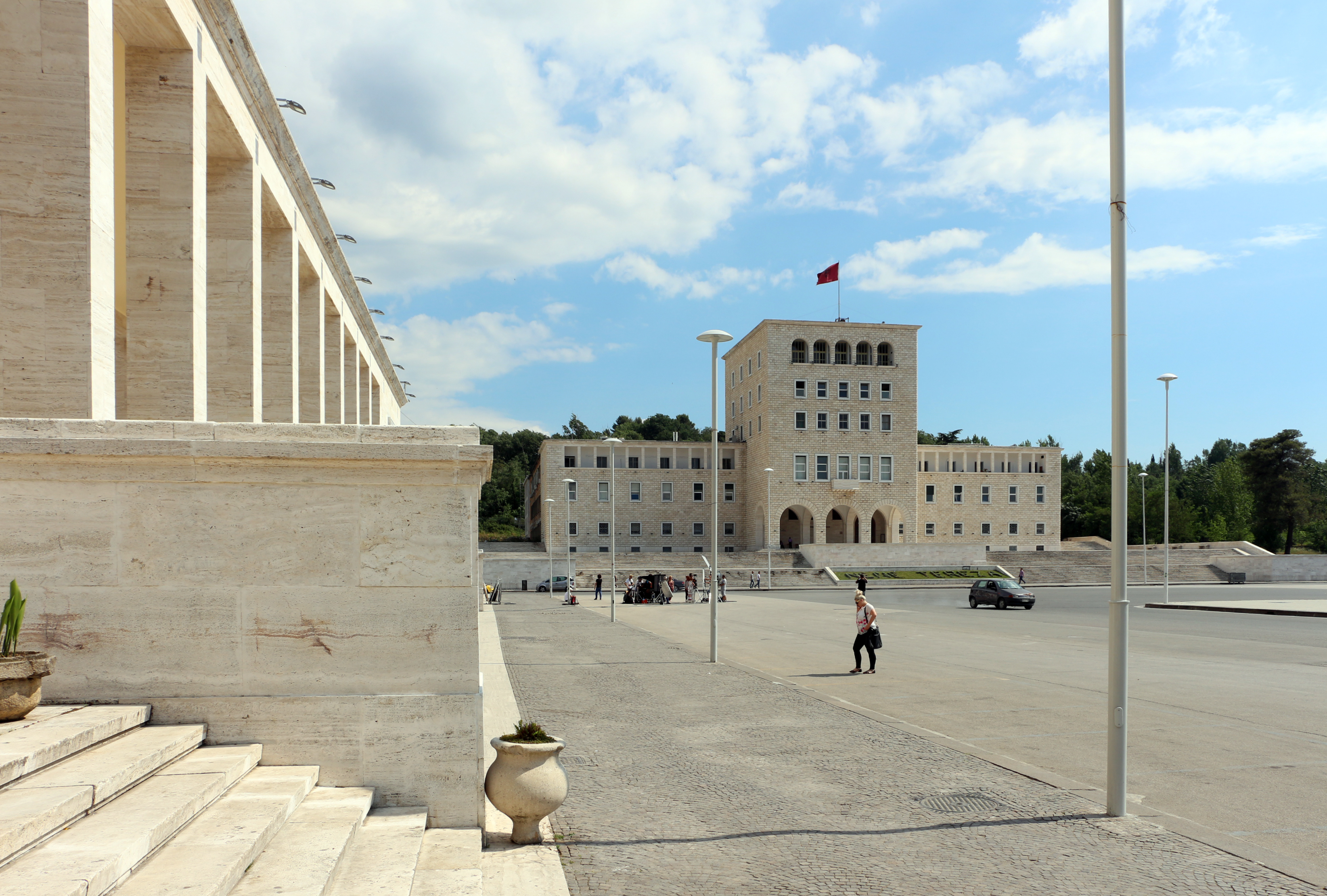
The Mother Teresa Square.

The Mother Teresa Square is the largest square in the capital. It was named after the Albanian Roman Catholic nun, missionary and nobelist Mother Teresa. The square was planned by the Italian Gherardo Bosio, during the Italian occupation of Albania in a Rationalist style. The square lies on the north-end of the Dëshmorët e Kombit Boulevard.

Today the square is reserved for traffic. In 2015, the square was closed for traffic every evening in the summer and used as a pedestrian zone and freestyle for cyclists. In December 2016 a Christmas market was organized on the square.

Many buildings are located on the street including the University of Tirana together with the University of Arts, the National Archeological Museum and the Centre of Albanological Studies.

=== Skanderbeg Square ===
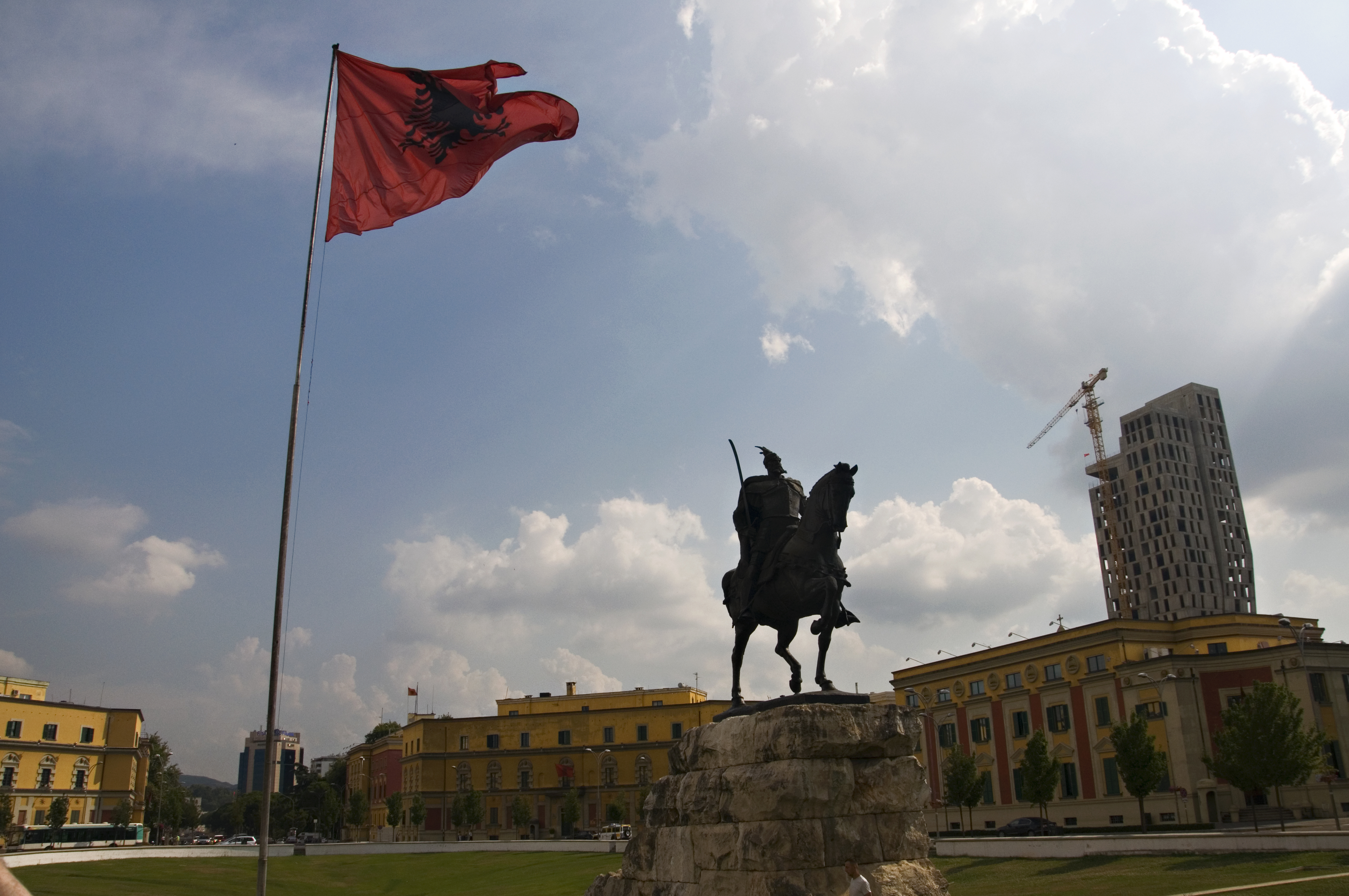
The Skanderbeg Square.

The Skanderbeg Square is the main square of the city and was named in 1968, after the medieval Albanian nobleman and national hero of the country, Gjergj Kastrioti Skanderbeg (Albanian: Gjergj Kastrioti). At the time of the Albanian monarchy, the square was composed of a number of buildings that would eventually be detonated during the communist period. The statue of Albania's leader Enver Hoxha was erected at the space between the National Historical Museum and the National Bank. Following the fall of communism in 1991, the statue would be removed amid student-led demonstrations.

In the 20th century, Florestano Di Fausto and Armando Brasini, well-known architects of the Benito Mussolini period in Italy, designed the city plan for Tirana, in Neo-Renaissance style with articulate angular solutions and giant order fascias.

The current mayor of Tirana, Erion Veliaj announced, that the former plan would be reintroduced with minor changes such as greater green space areas, an underground parking area, and the introduction of stone material taken from all corners of Albania and Albanian-speaking territories. The works started in 2016 with finishing of the small ring (Albanian: Unaza e Vogël) around the square. After the completion, it will serve as a venue, where the surrounding institutions would showcase themselves in an open environment concept on the square. It will also serve as a local farmers market with vendors from rural Tirana showcasing their products.

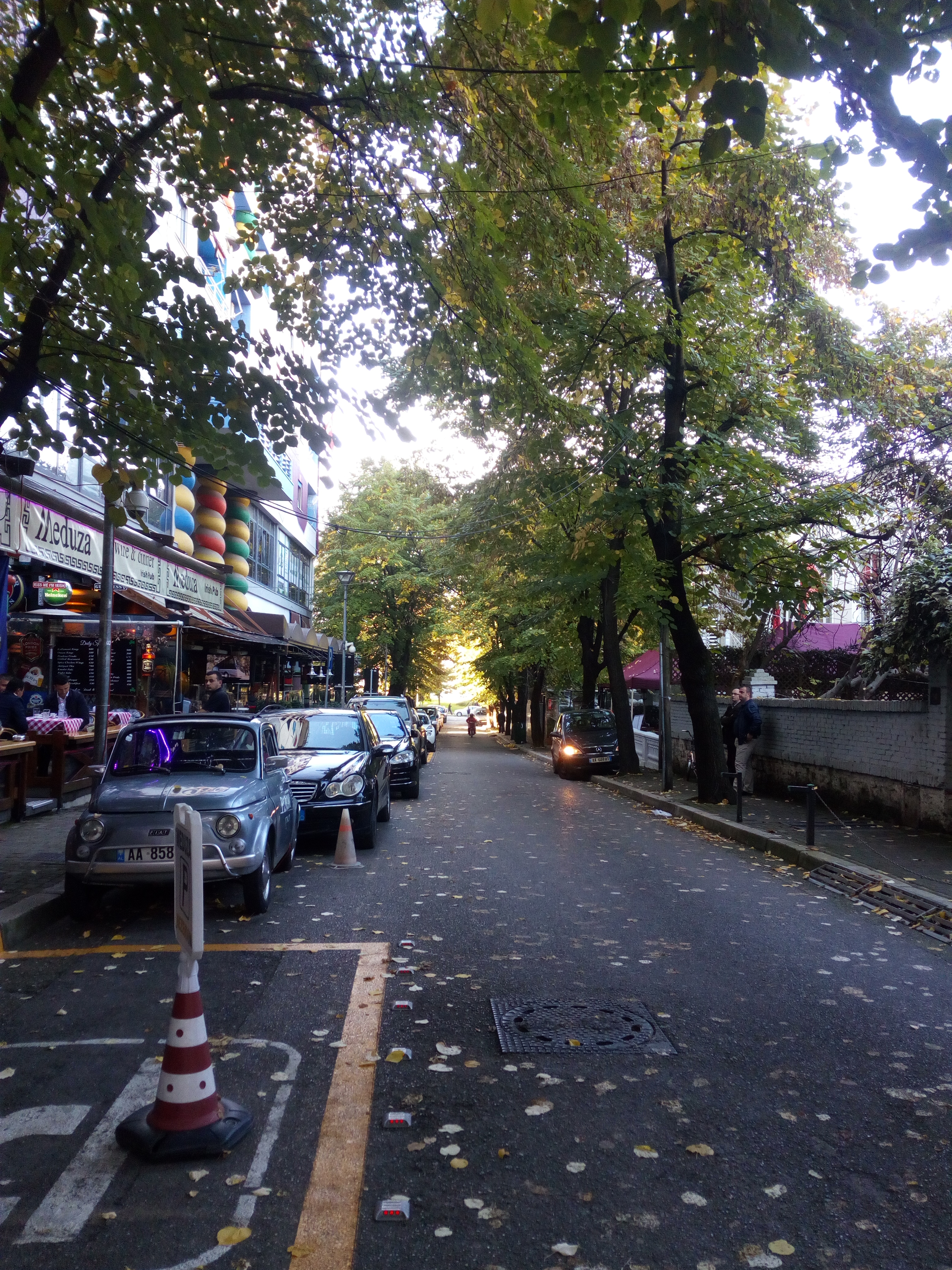
The Mustafa Matohiti Street in Blloku.

=== Blloku ===
The Blloku is widely known as an entertainment and shopping destination with its many boutiques, shops, restaurants, trendy bars, pubs and cafes. It became very attractive after the fall of Communism in Albania because during the Communist period it became a restricted residential area for the members of the Albanian politburo; ordinary Albanians would not be allowed in. On most maps it was unmarked. In Blloku you can still find the residence of the Albania's communist leader Enver Hoxha. Today, the Blloku is quite a mall, walking neighborhood, easily accessible from different parts of the city. Many clubs, bars, pubs and restaurants are located on that area. The first international fast food chain (KFC) in Albania, were also opened at Blloku.

=== Dëshmorët e Kombit Boulevard ===
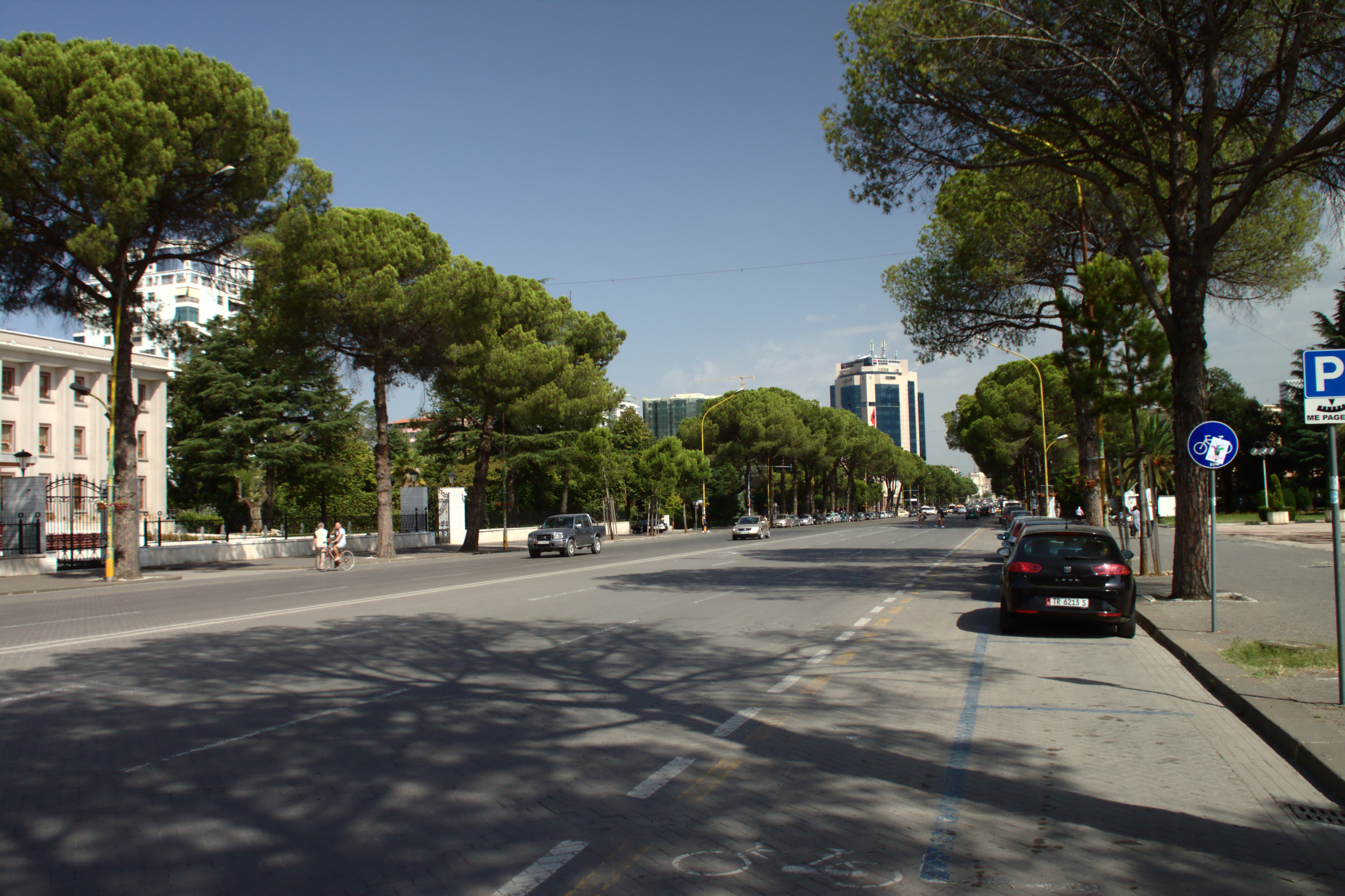
Dëshmorët e Kombit Boulevard

The Dëshmorët e Kombit Boulevard was also planned by the Italian Gherardo Bosio, during the Italian occupation of Albania also in a Rationalist style. Buildings are located along this boulevard, including several administrative buildings and financial buildings. It was created as part of a revamp of the Albanian capital in the late 1930s and 1940s. The street was created as part of a revamp of the Albanian capital in the 1930s and 1940s, for the rapidly growing city, which was concentrated in the north of the Lana river. During the communist era in Albania, major parades took regularly place.

The boulevard enters the city centre from the south and intersects with Bajram Curri Boulevard near the Rinia Park. Later, it became part of the Skanderbeg Square and then continues north of the centre as Zogu I Boulevard.

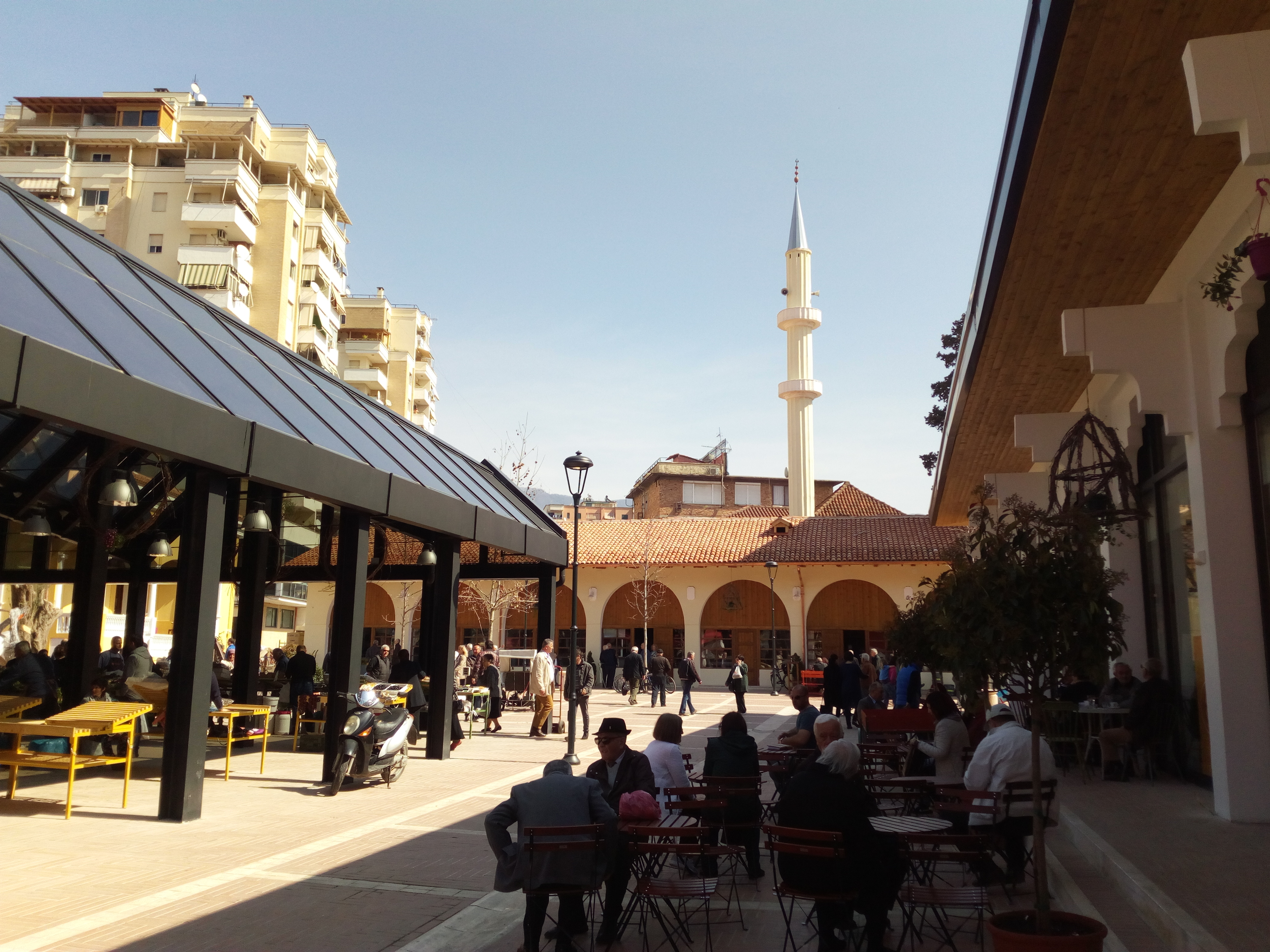
The Pazari i Ri (New Bazaar), with the Mosque of Mahmud Pasha Kokonozi in the background.

=== Pazari i ri ===
Pazari i Ri (English: New Pazar) is a neighbourhood of the city. It forms a part of the Old Town of Tirana. The name of the neighbourhood stems from the groceries marketplace (Albanian: Pazar), which is situated in the area.

The market offers a variety of fresh fruits, vegetables grown locally in the surrounding areas of Tirana, fish and meat, regional Albanian wine and raki. Many colorful buildings, restaurants and bakeries are situated on it. Recently, there have been a raising interest to make the Bazaar a touristic attraction. However, in 2017, the bazaar were renovated and reconstructed.

== Monuments ==
=== Clock Tower ===
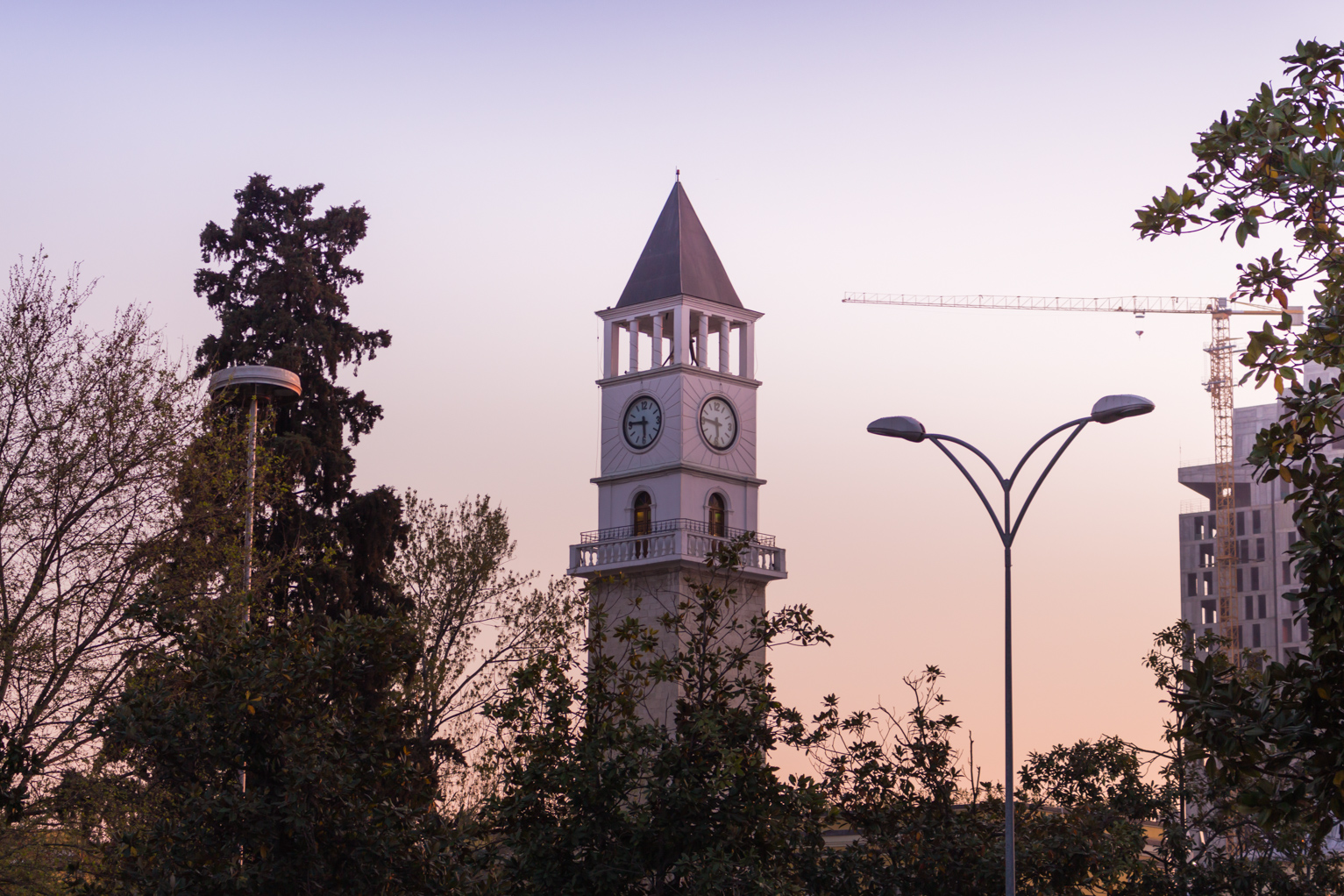
The Clock Tower

The Clock Tower of Tirana dates back to the 19th century and was built by the Ottoman Turks and originally had a bell from Venice that marked the time every hour. During the Ottoman period in the Balkans, many clock towers were built in there, serving as a meaning of inform the town, in order to let people know when they have to pray as well as the traders closing their shops. It has been adopted as the symbol of Tirana.

The stairs have 90 steps that go in a spiral fashion. It is 35 metres (115 ft) tall and was the tallest building in Tirana at the time. The clock was destroyed by bombardments during World War II and was replaced in 1946 with a Roman numeral clock from a church in Shkoder. The tower underwent renovation in 1981 and also in 1999. Access to the top of the tower has been available free of charge since 1996. A new restoration is ongoing by The Municipality of Tirana in 2010 for tourists. The dome has a similar architectural style such as the St Mark's Campanile in Venice.

=== Et'hem Bey Mosque ===
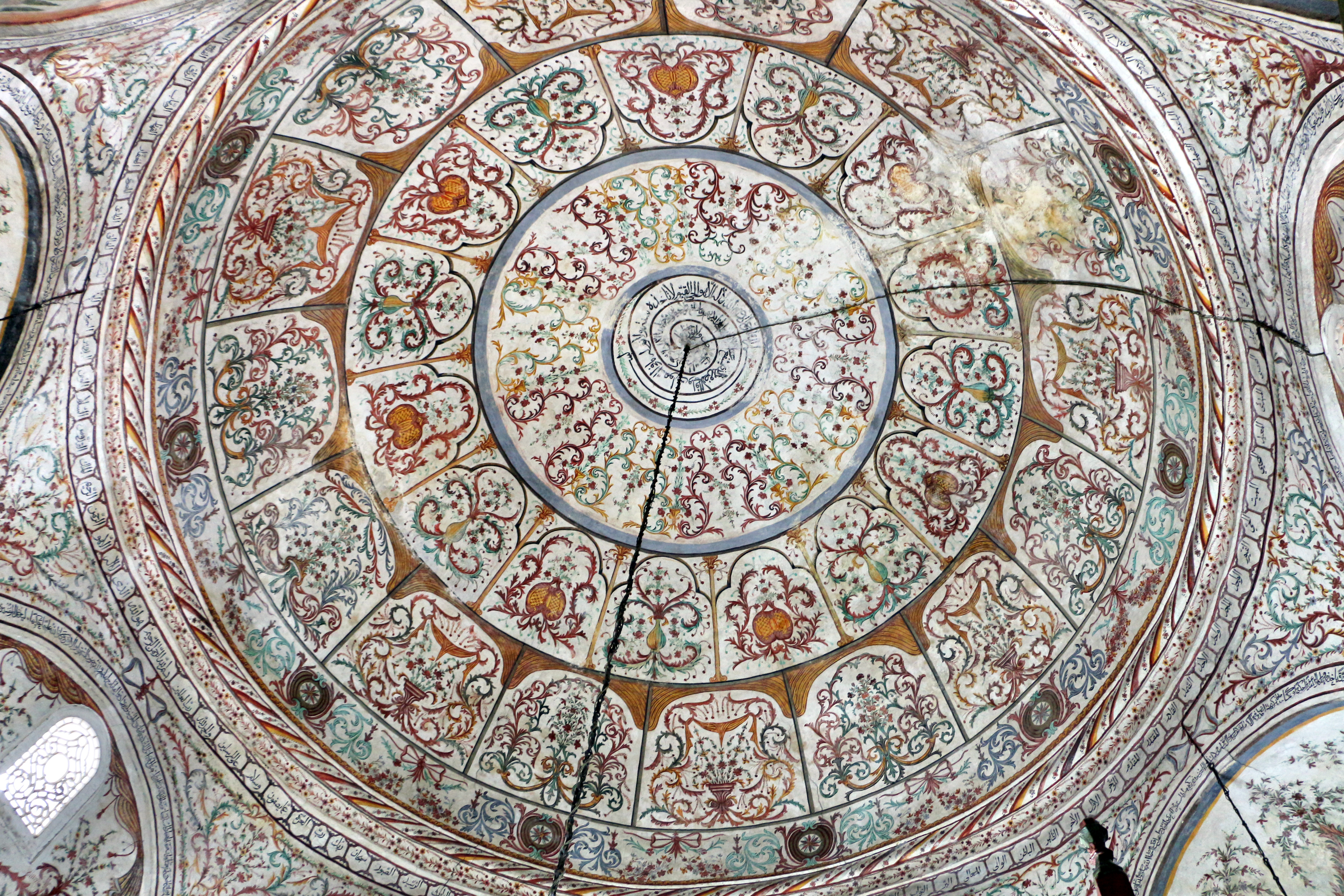
The dome from the inside.

The Et'hem Bey Mosque is located next to the Clock Tower and building was commenced in the 18th century by Molla Bey and finished in 1819 by his son Haxhi Ethem Bey, grand-grandson of Sulejman Pasha. The mosque was closed during the communist regime in Albania and was reopened as a house of worship after the fall of communism in Albania in 1991, without permission from the authorities. However, the mosque is composed by a prayer hall, a portico that surrounds it from the east and north also the minaret. On the north part of the mosque, there is the entrance to the prayer hall located, which is squared plan and is constructed in a unique volume. It is covered with a dome. The dome is semi-spherical, without windows. The frescoes of the mosque depict trees, waterfalls and bridges. Still life is very rare in the Islamic art. For tourists, the mosque is open outside of the time of prayer. The Khawaja (Albanian: Hoxha) leads visitors to the minaret.

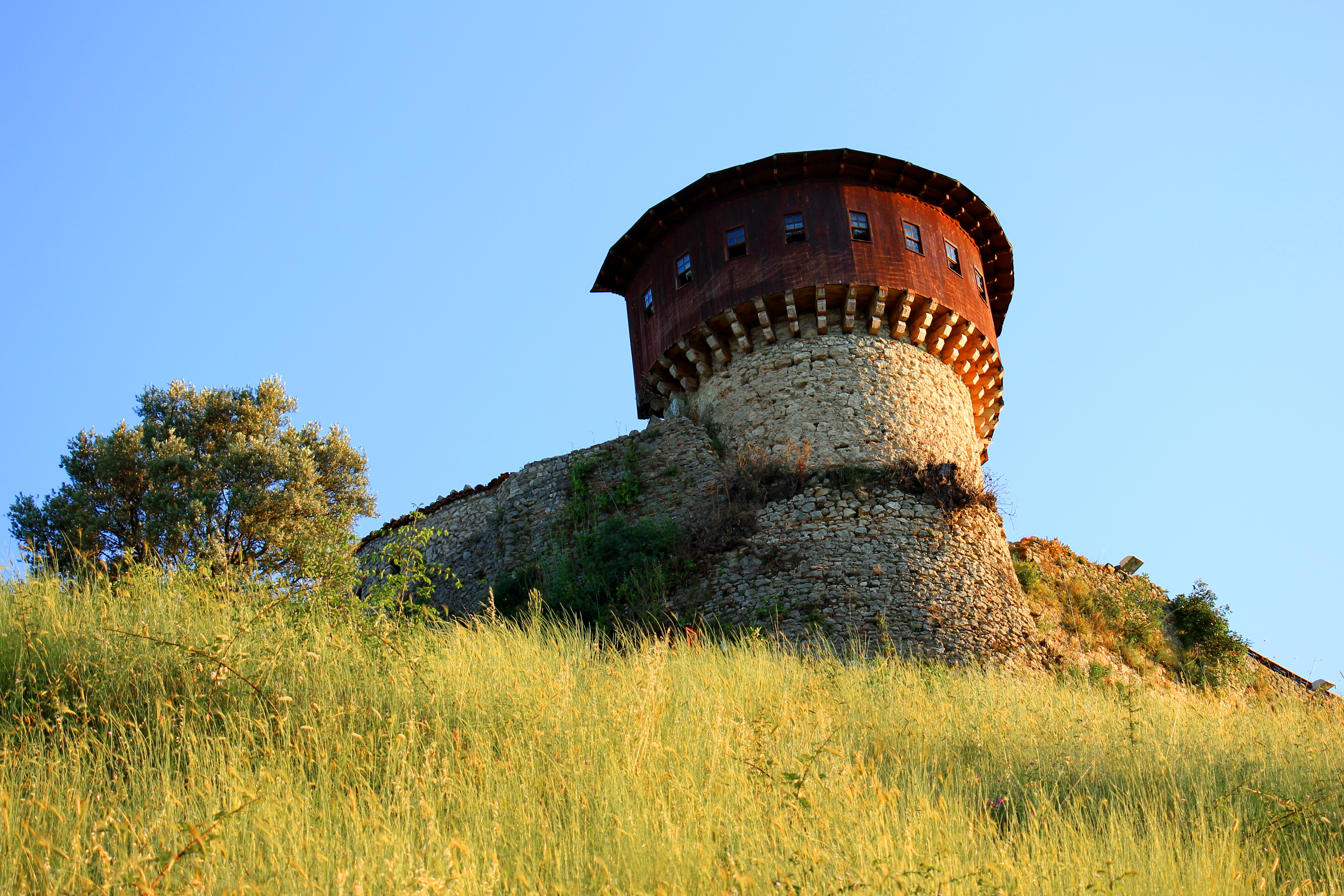
Petrelë Castle

=== Petrelë Castle ===
The Petrelë Castle is one of the tourist locations close to Tirana that attracts a great number of visitors. Its history dates back to Byzantine emperor, Justinian I. It lies on the main road starting from Tirana to Elbasan. Its location, attracts the attention of many visitors. It is triangular and has two observation towers. Although there already existed ancient fortifications at this site, the current design is 15th century. As a tourist attraction, a restaurant was opened inside the castle. However, it offers visitors unique views of the valley Erzen, picturesque hills, olive groves and the distant mountains.

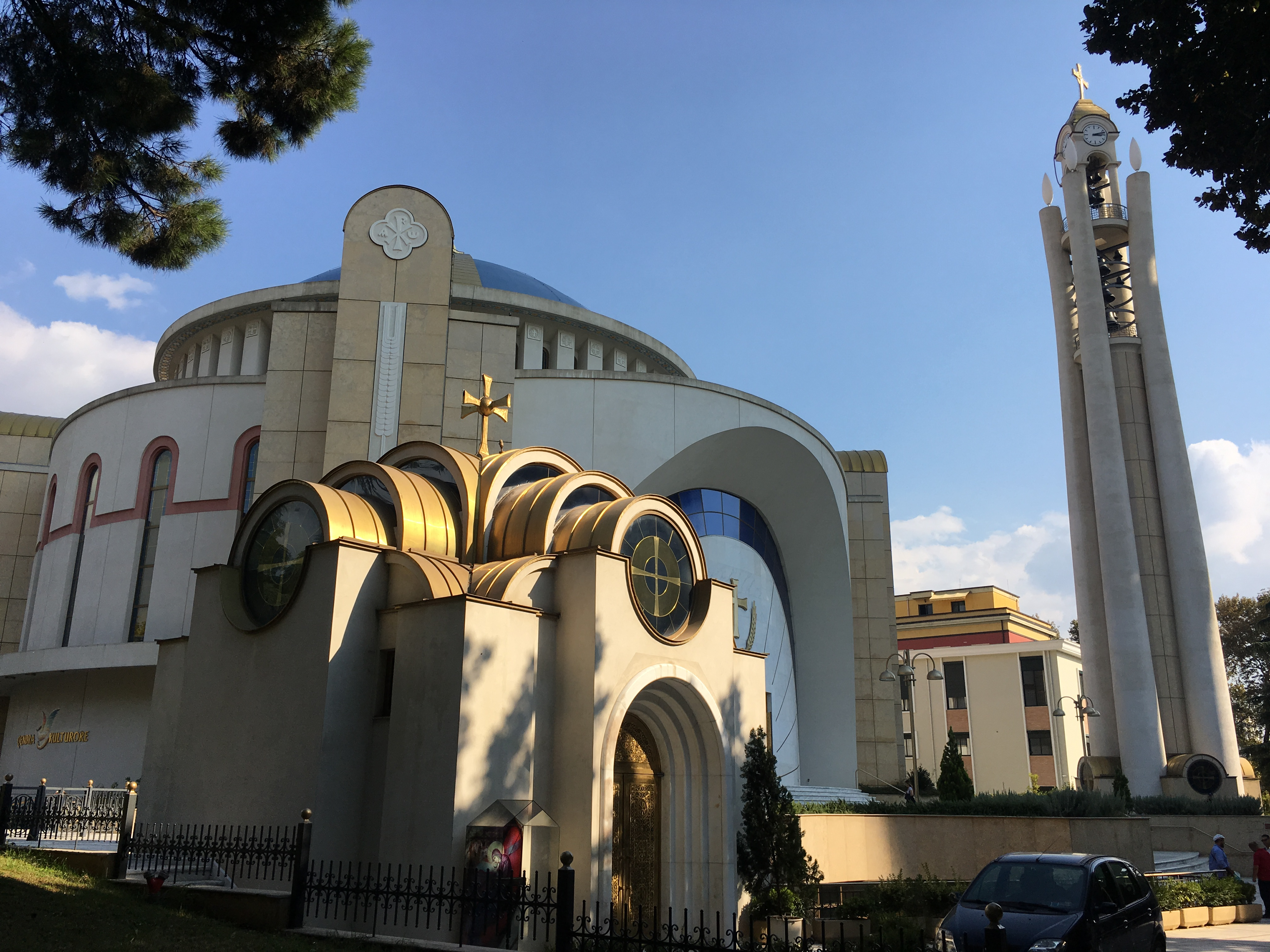
Resurrection Cathedral of Tirana

=== Resurrection Cathedral ===
Tirana's Resurrection Cathedral is the third largest orthodox cathedral in Europe and was completed in 2012. The cathedral's dome is 32.2 metres high, with the bell tower reaching 46 metres. The complex includes the cathedral, three chapels of the nativity, the bell tower, the residence of the Holy Synod, the cultural center, and a library. On the eastern side, there is a small museum, a lecture hall, a surrounding for banquets and an area for exhibitions and children's activities.

=== Kapllan Pasha Tomb ===
The Tomb of Kapllan Pasha was built on the early 18th century, with carved stones and has an octagonal shape.

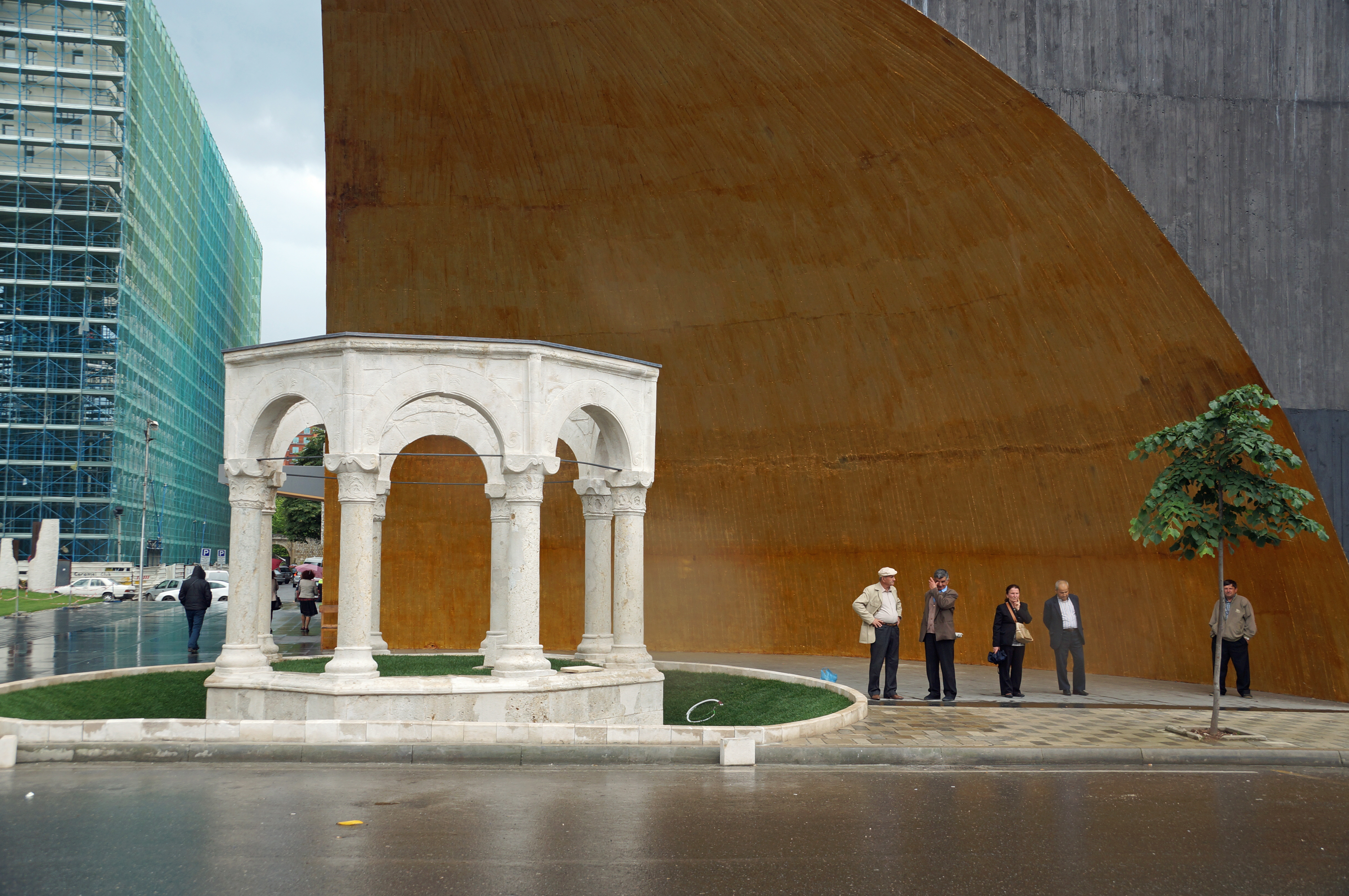
Kapllan Pasha Tomb

=== Mother Albania ===
The Mother Albania is a 12-metre statue located at the National Martyrs' Cemetery in the southeast of the city, dedicated in 1971. The statue figuratively represents Albania, as a mother guarding over the eternal slumber of those who gave their lives for her. The statue holds a wreath of laurels and a star. It was also the resting place of former dictator Enver Hoxha, who was subsequently disinterred and given a more humble grave in another public cemetery. On the front of the pedestal is the inscription Lavdi e Përjetshme Dëshmorëve të Atdheut (English: Perpetual fame for the martyrs of the fatherland).

Almost 28,000 graves are on the cemetery of partisans from the Second World War. The tomb of dictator Enver Hoxha, a decade-long dictator, was also at the cemetery, until it was exhumed in 1992 and transferred to a public cemetery with a simpler tombstone.

=== Sacred Heart Church ===
The catholic Sacred Heart Church was built in 1939 by the Italians. In 1967, the church was closed. When it reopened, in 1990, Lonely Planet described the church as having "hilariously garish photo realistic images over a Communist whitewash that have to be seen to be believed".

=== Mount Dajti ===
Mount Dajti National Park is considered by the people of Tirana as the Natural Balcony of Tirana. In winter, the mountain is often covered with snow, and it is a popular retreat to the local population of Tirana that rarely sees snow fall. The mountain can be reached through the Dajti Express cable car. Mountain slopes are densely vegetated mostly by sturdy pines and beech trees. In winter the park lies under snow and it became a popular winter destination for residents of Tirana.

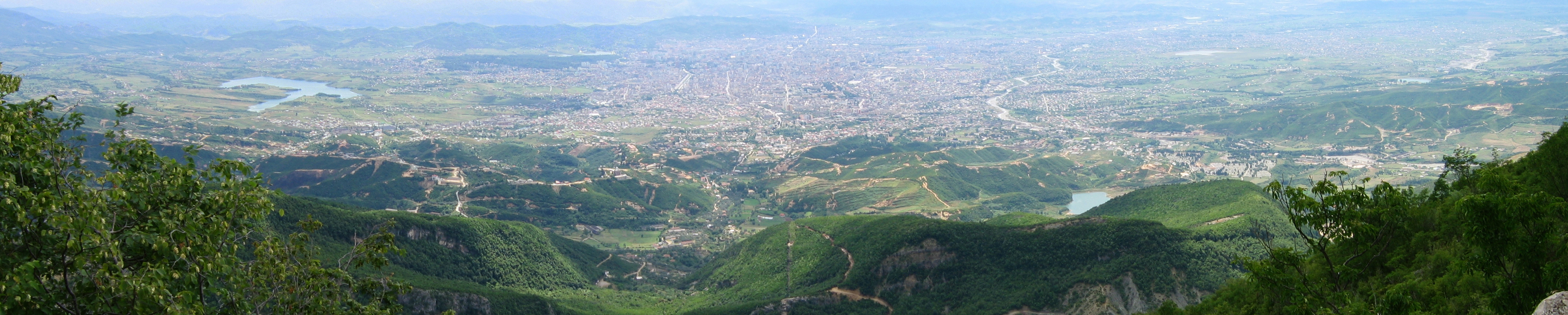
Tirana as seen from Dajti

== See also ==
- Tirana
- Culture in Tirana
