= National Museum of Fine Arts =

National Museum of Fine Arts may refer to:

- National Museum of Fine Arts (Albania)
- Museo Nacional de Bellas Artes (Buenos Aires), Argentina
- Museu Nacional de Belas Artes in Brazil
- Chilean National Museum of Fine Arts in Chile
- Museo Nacional de Bellas Artes de La Habana, Cuba
- National Museum of Fine Arts, Malta
- National Museum of Fine Arts (Manila) in the Philippines
- Nationalmuseum in Sweden
- National Taiwan Museum of Fine Arts
- Vietnam National Museum of Fine Arts
