= House of Leaves (disambiguation) =

House of Leaves is a 2000 novel by Mark Z. Danielewski.

House of Leaves may also refer to:

- "House of Leaves", a song by Poe from Haunted
- "House of Leaves", a hidden track by Circa Survive from Juturna
- The colloquial name for the headquarters of the Albanian secret police, now the Museum of Secret Surveillance
