= Mother Albania (disambiguation) =

Mother Albania may refer to:

- Mother Albania (statue), dedicated in 1971 at the National Martyrs Cemetery of Albania
- "Mother Albania" (poem) by Dritëro Agolli
- Mother Albania (opera) by Avni Mula
