= Tirana historical places =

Tirana is the capital and the largest city of Albania. Modern Tirana was founded as an Ottoman town in 1614 by Sulejman Bargjini, a local ruler from Mullet, although the area has been continuously inhabited since antiquity. Tirana became Albania's capital city in 1920 and has a population of over 600,000. The city is home to many universities and is the center of the political, economical, and cultural life of the country.

== Historical places and national parks ==
The National Historical Museum of Albania is located in Tirana, on the main Skanderbeg Square. The square is named after the Albanian national hero. In the National Historical Museum of Albania there are over 4750 historical objects. The exhibition includes objects from the Stone Age through the ancient world until the 15th century, exclusively on the Albanian history, full of historical twists. There are richly decorated robes of the Albanian rulers or things specific to historical events, emblems of Albanian princes, the cathedral pillars, reliefs, icons created by the greatest Albanian artists and many other attractions of Albanian history.

The Skanderbeg Monument in Tirana is an 11 metres high statue of Albania's national hero. The statue was cast in 1968 by Odis Pacali for the 500th anniversary of Skandersbeg's death.

Dajti Mountain National Park is a protected area. It is located in the central part of the country, about 10 km east of the capital Tirana . The Park is situated at altitudes from 300 meters to 1,600 meters. The highest peak of Dajti Park is Mount Dajti with an altitude of 1613 meters. The Park covers an area of 3300 hectares. It was established on 1 January 1996. Mountain slopes are densely vegetated mostly by sturdy pines and beech trees. In winter the park lies under snow and it became a popular winter destination for residents of Tirana.

Petrela Castle also called the Petrel is located in central Albania, near Tirana. It lies on the right side of the main road from Tirana to Elbasan. Its location naturally attracts the attention of many visitors. Petrela Castle is located on the hill above the village of the same name. It is triangular and has two observation towers. Although there already existed ancient fortifications at this site, the current design is 15th century. Inside the castle is a restaurant. Petrela Castle offers visitors unique views of the valley Erzen, picturesque hills, olive groves and distant mountains.

== See also ==
- Landmarks in Tirana
