= Cloud Pavilion =

Public art installation in Tirana, Albania

- Reja (Albanian)
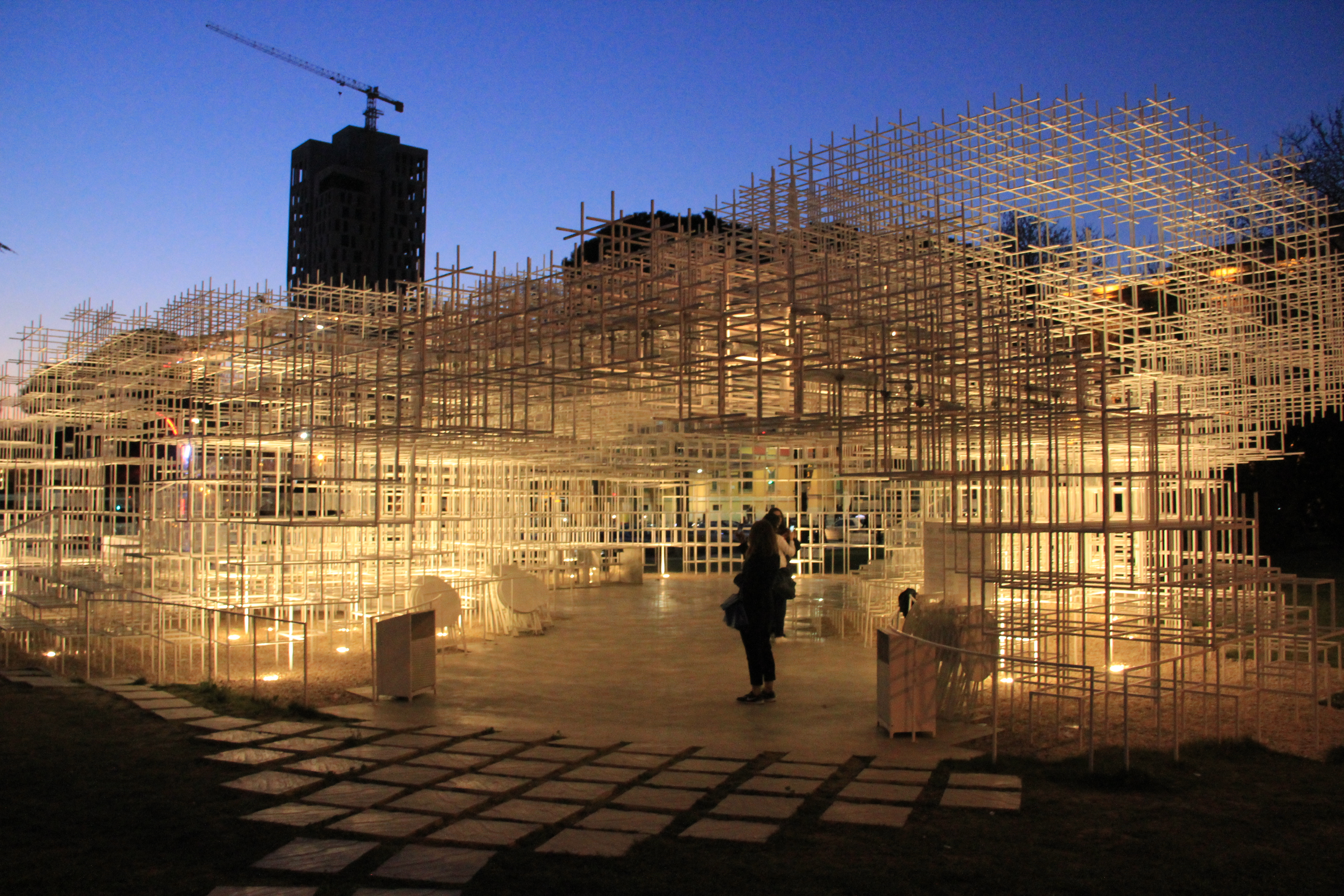
- The Cloud in 2017
- Artist: Sou Fujimoto
- Completion date: 2016 ^{1}
- Location: Tirana; 41°19′32″N 19°49′10″E
- Owner: Municipality of Tirana

^{1}The Cloud was originally completed in 2013, but was dismantled and rebuilt in Tirana.

The Cloud Pavilion (Albanian: Reja), or The Cloud, is a public art installation, used for multiple purposes situated in the central part of Tirana, Albania, located next to the National Gallery of Arts. It was built by Japanese artist Sou Fujimoto.

Before being moved to Tirana, it was located in Hyde Park, London.

The Cloud as seen from the streets.

== Design ==
Steel bars in The Cloud

The Cloud Pavilion is made out of units made out of steel bars measuring 800 and 400mm. It has 2 entrances and a lot of seating for visitors. To protect visitors from the elements, polycarbonate disks have been placed in clusters around the structure.

Next to The Cloud, there is some empty space, mainly used for upcoming events. Due to its shape, many people, especially children, climb the structure to get to the top.

== Events ==
The Cloud Pavilion has held many events in the past, most notably the annual Cloud Festival, which has been held there since 2016. This festival is hosted for around 11 days during late May. It has also held multiple open-air movie screenings, music performances, etc.

== History in London ==
The Cloud Pavilion was located in London, before being moved to Tirana. Fujimoto accepted the invitation to create a temporary structure for the Serpentine Gallery. It was intended to be used a social space, occupying around 350 square meters of lawn in front of the gallery. It was located there for 4 months, from June to October 2013. After 3 years, The Cloud was rebuilt in Tirana.

== Gallery ==
Polycarbonate discs protect visitors from the rain
