= Museum of Secret Surveillance =

- Muzeu i Përgjimeve të Sigurimit të Shtetit
- Official logo

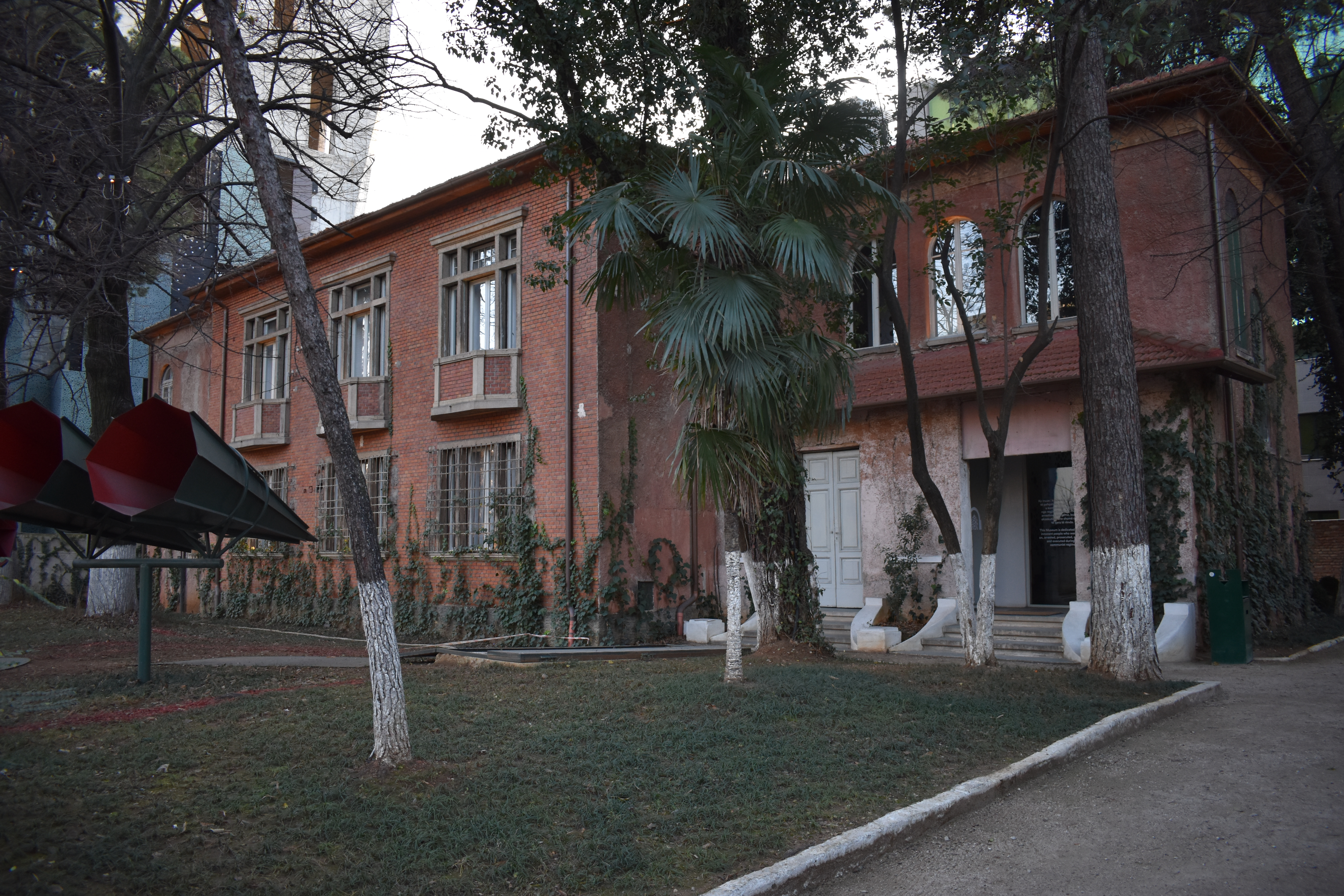
- House of Leaves museum
- Former name: House of Leaves
- Established: 23 May 2017
- Location: Tirana, Albania
- Coordinates: 41°19′36″N 19°48′59″E
- Type: Communism history museum
- Website: muzeugjethi.gov.al

The Museum of Secret Surveillance (Albanian: Muzeu i Përgjimeve të Sigurimit të Shtetit), also known as House of Leaves (Shtëpia me Gjethe) is a historical museum in Tirana, Albania. It opened on 23 May 2017 in the building that served as the Sigurimi's headquarters during the communist era.

The museum is "dedicated to the innocent people who were spied on, arrested, prosecuted, convicted and executed during the communist regime".

== History ==
The museum is housed in a two-story villa with a courtyard that dates from 1931 and originally served as the first private obstetrics clinic in Albania. During the German occupation, the building was used by the Gestapo. After the war it was used as the Sigurimi's interception headquarters until the collapse of the communist regime in 1991.

The Museum of Secret Surveillance opened on 23 May 2017. The building is located in the city center. The building is known as the “House of Leaves”, so called because of the clambering plant that covers its facade. It has 31 rooms.

The museum was awarded the prize of European Museum of the Year Award 2020 by the Council of Europe.

The museum showcases surveillance techniques and devices used by the Sigurimi, as well as original internal documents dealing with their operations. There is a darkroom for developing film, and a laboratory for processing chemicals and fingerprints. In the garden, the entrance to an underground tunnel with a concrete door can be seen.

The building is featured in the 2006 film The Lives of Others.

== See also ==
- Culture of Tirana
- Landmarks in Tirana
- History of Albania
