= Culture of Tirana =

Flag of the city of Tirana.

The Culture of Tirana concerns the arts, music, museums, festivals and other entertainment in the capital city of Albania. Tirana is one of the country's leading business and cultural centers including entertainment, music, media, fashion, and the arts all contribute to its status as Albania's largest city.

== Architecture ==
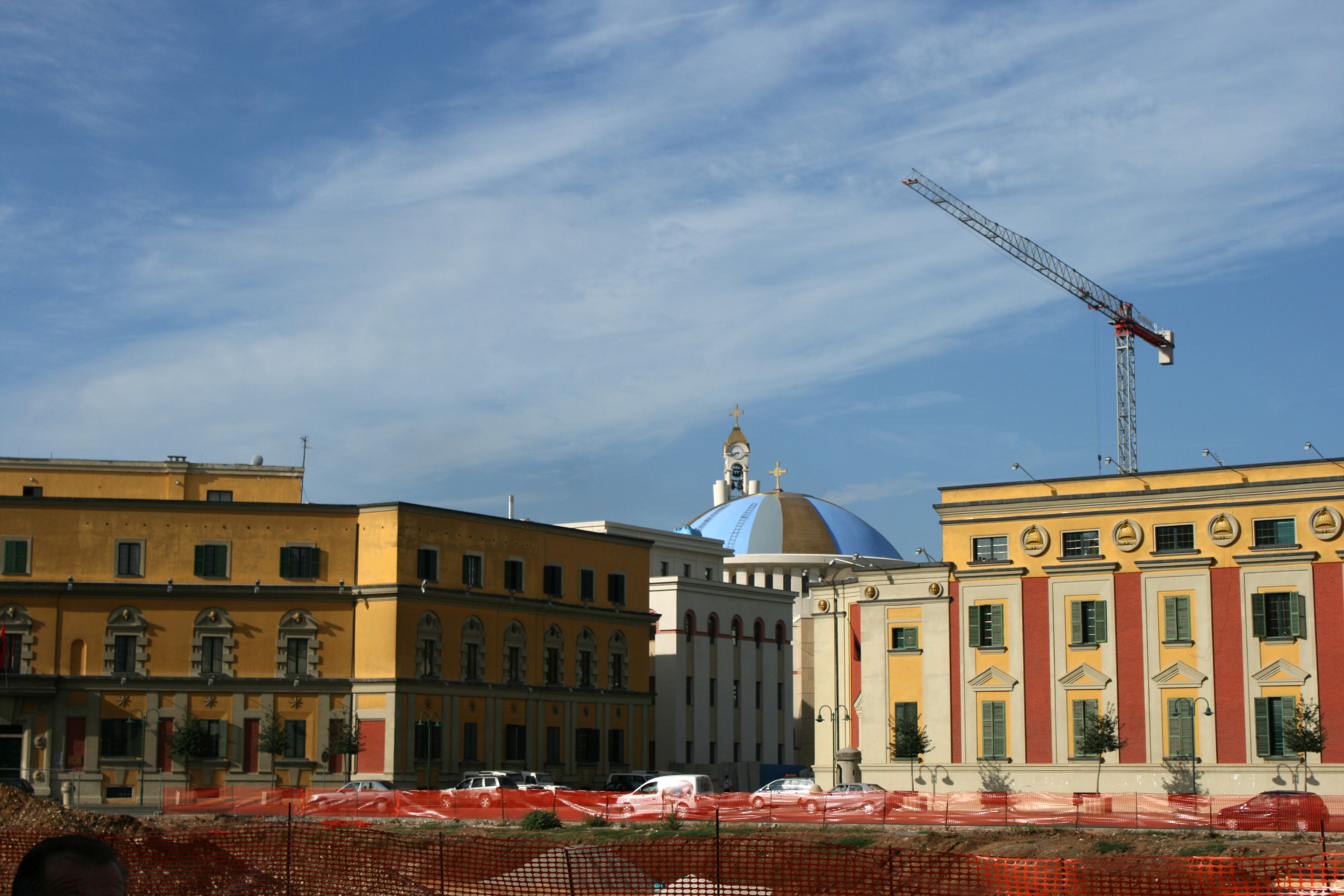
Two architects of the Benito Mussolini period in Italy, designed the city plan in neo-Renaissance style with articulate angular solutions and giant order fascias.

Tirana is home to different architectural styles that represent influential periods in its history dating back to the antiquity. The architecture of Tirana as the capital of Albania, was marked by two totalitarian regimes, by the fascist regime of Benito Mussolini during World War II and the communist regime. Both have left their mark on the city with their typical architecture.

In addition to the objects of the architecture of the totalitarian regimes of 20th century, Tirana offers a couple of other such objects of both periods. The Palace of Brigades (former Palace of the Albania's King Zog I), the ministries buildings, the government building and the municipality hall are designed by Florestano Di Fausto and Armando Brasini, both well-known architects of the Mussolini period in Italy. The Dëshmorët e Kombit Boulevard was built in 1930 and given the name King Zog I Boulevard. In the communist period, the part from Skanderbeg Square up to the train station was named Stalin Boulevard. The Royal Palace or Palace of Brigades previously served as the official residence of King Zog I. It has been used by different Albanian governments for various purposes. Because of the outbreak of World War II, and the 1939 Italian invasion of Albania, King Zog I fled Albania and never had a chance to see the Palace fully constructed. The Italians finished it and used it as the Army Headquarters. The Palace took its nickname Palace of Brigades because it was taken from the Italians by a people army brigade.

== Museums ==
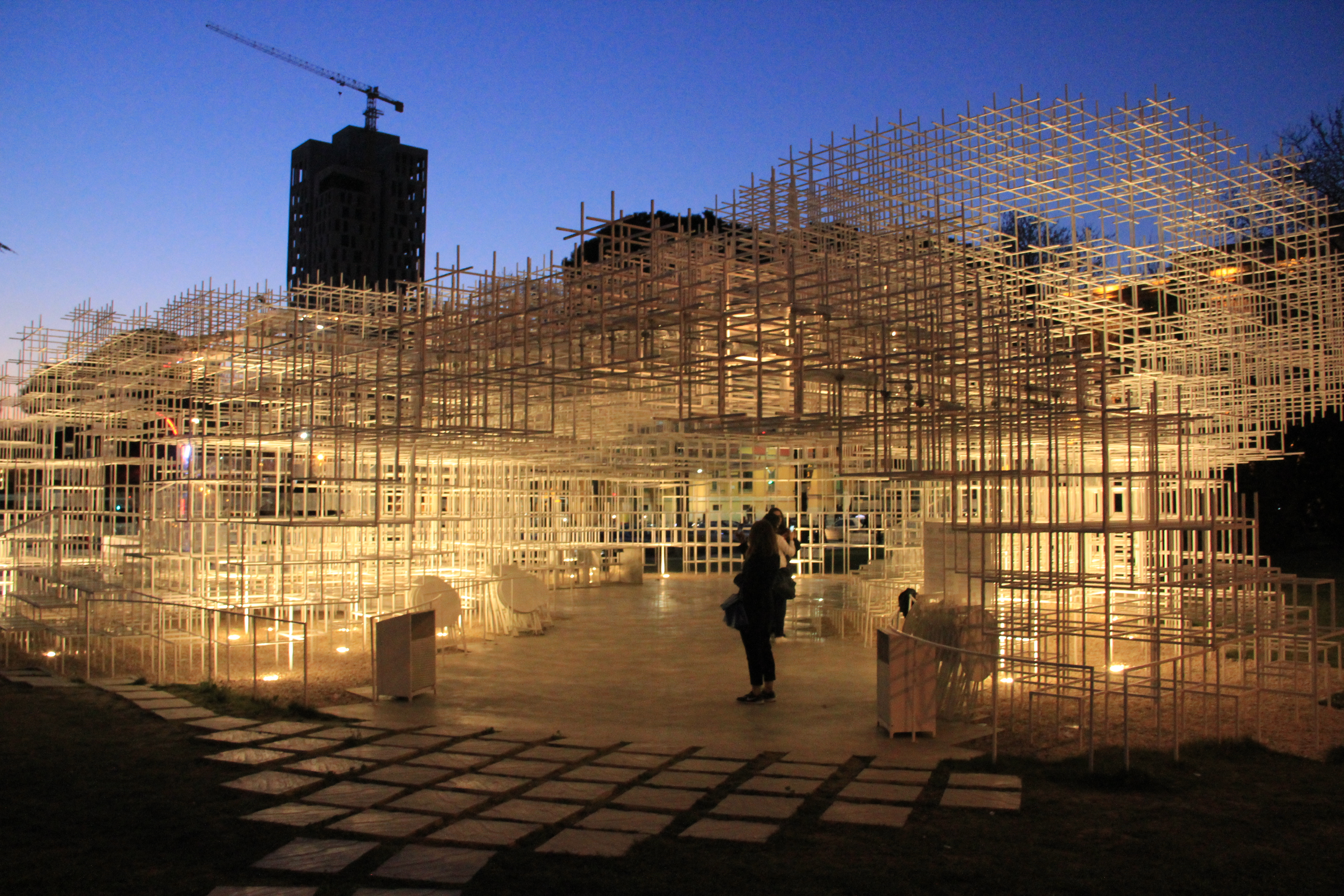
The Cloud Pavilion outside the National Art Gallery.

Tirana's museums and monuments are among its most highly esteemed attractions. The National Historical Museum is the largest Museum in the country and details the history of the country. It was opened on 28 October 1981 and is 27,000 square metres (290,000 square feet) in size, while 18,000 square metres (190,000 square feet) are available for exhibitions. It hosts some of the best archeological finds in country, dating from Prehistory to the modern Italians. In the stands of the pavilion there are photos of global personalities who met Mother Teresa: Jacques Chirac, Bill Clinton, Tony Blair, Ibrahim Kodra and others. The National Archaeological Museum is the national archaeological museum is the first museum created after World War II in Albania. The National Art Gallery opened to the public on 11 January 1954. The museum preserves over 5000 artworks.

The Natural Sciences Museum was founded in 1948 is affiliated with the University of Tirana and has branches in zoology, botany and geology. The former Enver Hoxha Museum is a pyramid-shaped structure dedicated to the communist dictator Enver Hoxha. It served as a museum about his legacy, but after the Fall of communism in Albania, it became a conference center and exhibition venue.

== Festivals ==
Tirana is becoming a popular hub for different events. Festivals are one of several things that locals enjoy well. It has a large number of festivals and events. The diversity of festivals makes it possible for people of different tastes to find themselves in a city this small. Festivals in the city provide entertainment for the youth as well as for adults. The Summer Festival takes place every year on March 14, celebrating the Spring Day (Albanian: Dita e Veres), the country's largest pagan festival. It is widely celebrated in Tirana and as well as in other cities in Albania and the Arbëresh colonies in Italy. Another major event, the Tirana International Film Festival takes place in Tirana each year, which brings a large number of artists to produce a wide range of interesting film works. Other festivals include the Tirana Jazz Festival, the Guitar Sounds Festival, the Albanian Wine Festival and more. In 2016, the first Telekom Electronic Beats Festival were held in Tirana, bringing the latest trends from the urban lifestyle to the Albanian youth. This is the effort of Tirana to increase the number of tourist visits. However, the city is become a popular destination for many young people around the region during the vacation period.

== Nightlife ==
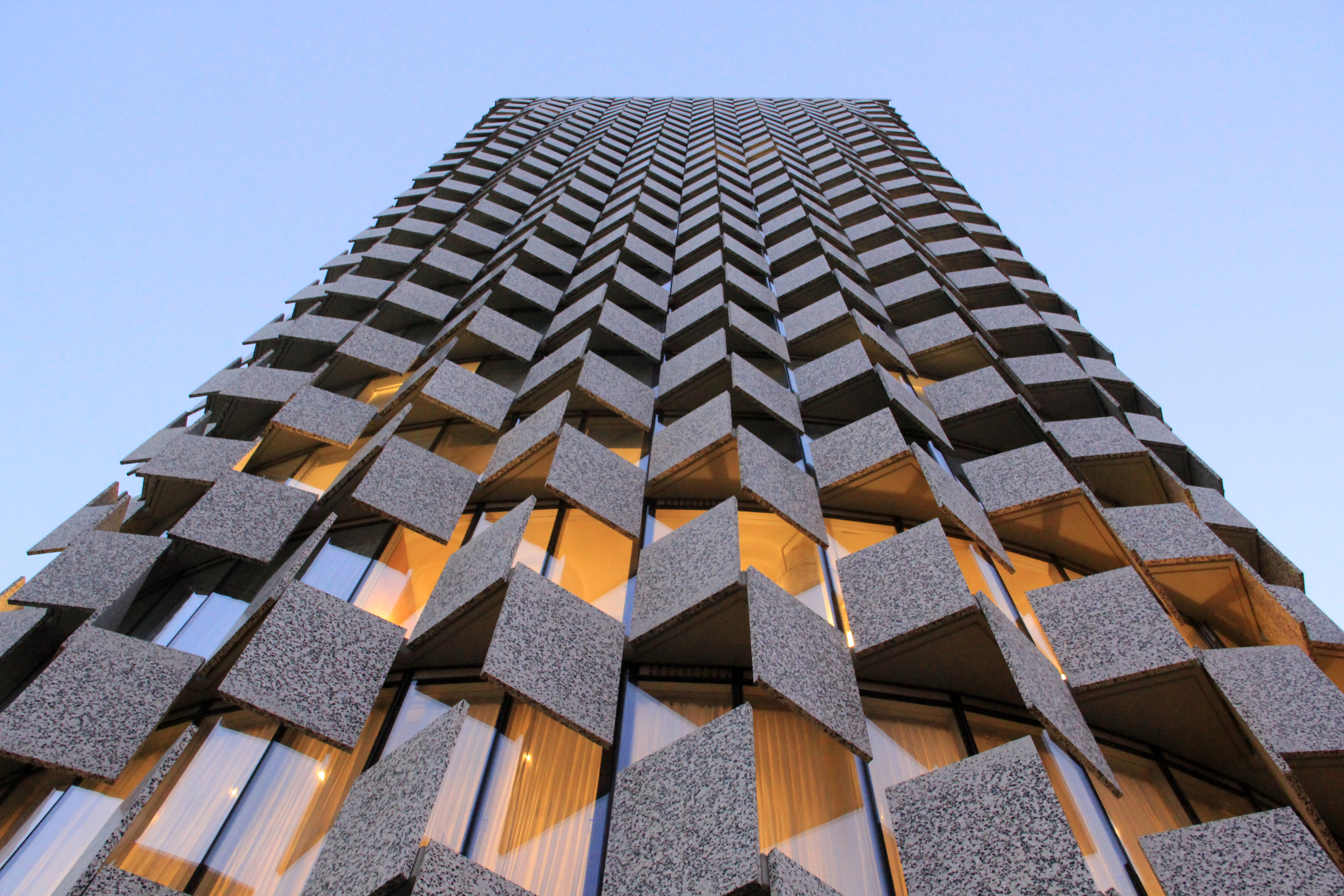
The five star Plaza Hotel.

Tirana has a diverse and vibrant nightlife. Among the youth, the most popular destination is the Blloku area. There are many pubs, bars, clubs, cafes, restaurants can be found throughout the area. Blloku is quite a small, walking neighborhood, easily accessible from different parts of the city. The entrance is only 10 minutes by foot from the city centre.

Among the most popular nightclubs are Folie Terrace, Cinco Cavalli, Lollipop, Moscow, Arena and Mumja Club, where world-famous disc jockeys and idiosyncratic local performances are frequent. Some of the most popular cafés in Tirana are Mon Chéri Coffee Shop, Sophie Caffe, Cioccolatitaliani Tirana, D'angelo Coffee Shop and The Tea Room. The largest hotels of the city are the Tirana International Hotel and The Plaza situated in the heart of the city near the Skanderbeg Square. The luxury Sheraton Hotel Tirana is also located in city center of Tirana, near central business district next to the National Arena. Other major hotels present in central Tirana include the Xheko Imperial Hotel, Rogner Hotel, Mondial Hotel and Hotel Opera Tirana. The Hilton Hotel will open very soon in Tirana.

== Tourism ==
Tourism in Tirana is developing year by year since the fall of communism and the capital city of Tirana become a very popular tourist destinations after the southern Albanian Riviera and northern part of the country. Tirana has a majority of luxury hotels, modern restaurants, bars, pubs and very big nightclubs. Tirana is a place that is known as a university center of students from regional countries like Kosovo, Macedonia, Montenegro and Greece.

According to the Polish Tour Operators Association, Tirana has entered into the 10th most visited cities by the Poles. The French Télérama ranked Tirana also to the Top 10 of best destination to be visited in 2017.

Most tourists to the city come from Greece, Italy, Kosovo and Europe, with the number of visitors from elsewhere growing every year, thanks to an increasing number of international airline arrivals at Mother Teresa International Airport as well as luxury cruises that arrive into the Port of Durrës that offers day trips to the city.

== See also ==
- Coffee culture
- Landmarks in Tirana
