= Mother Albania (statue) =

Statue located at the National Martyrs Cemetery of Albania

Mother Albania Nëna Shqipëri
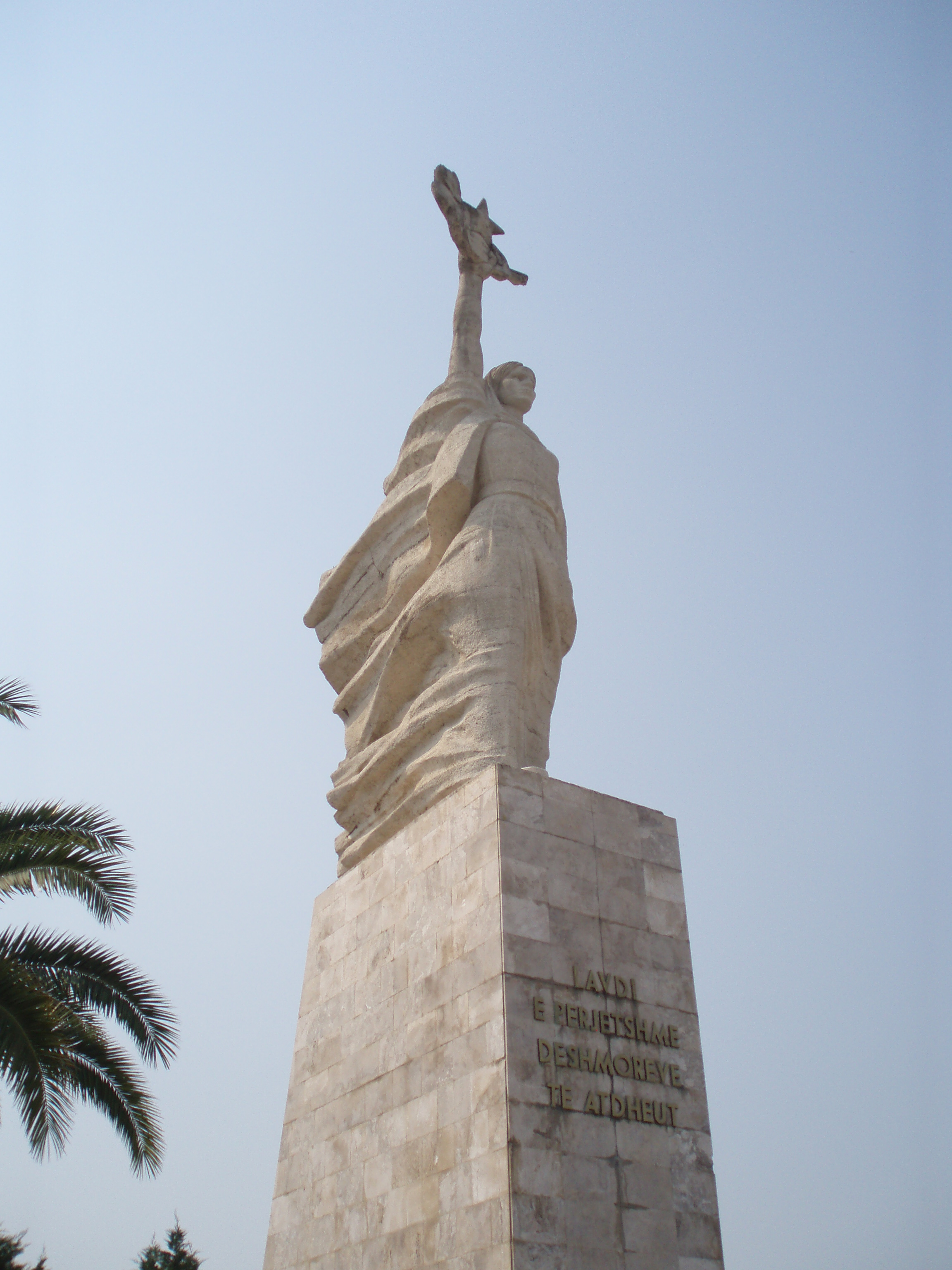
- Interactive map of Mother Albania; Nëna Shqipëri
- 41°18′31″N 19°50′24″E
- Location: Rruga e Elbasanit; Tirana, Albania

Site notes
- Height: 3 m (9.8 ft)
- Restored: Kristaq Rama, Muntaz Dhrami and Shaban Hadëri

Mother Albania (Albanian: Nëna Shqipëri) is a 12-metre-tall (39 ft) statue located at the National Martyrs' Cemetery of Albania (Albanian: Dëshmorët e Kombit) in Albania, dedicated in 1972.

The statue represents the country as a mother guarding over the eternal slumber of those who gave their lives for her. There are up to 28,000 graves of Albanian partisans in the cemetery, all of whom perished during World War II. The massive statue holds a wreath of laurels and a star. The cemetery was also the resting place of former leader Enver Hoxha, who was subsequently disinterred and given a more humble grave in another public cemetery.

The statue is made of concrete and it is a work of the sculptors Kristaq Rama, Muntaz Dhrami (1936-) & Shaban Hadëri (1928-2010). It stands atop a 3-metre pedestal; engraved on the pedestal are the words "Lavdi e përjetshme dëshmorëve të atdheut" ("Eternal glory to the martyrs of the fatherland").

== Gallery ==
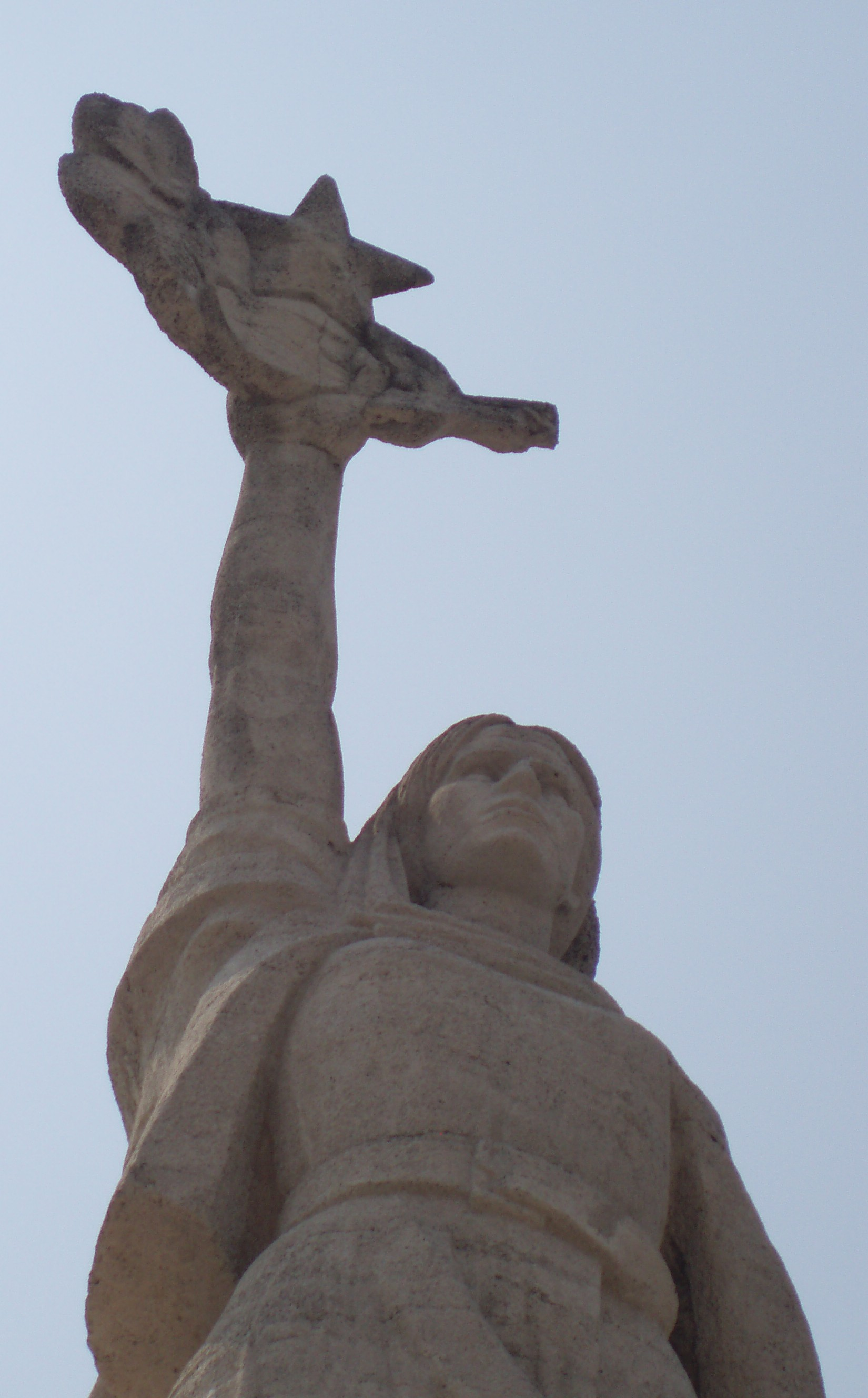

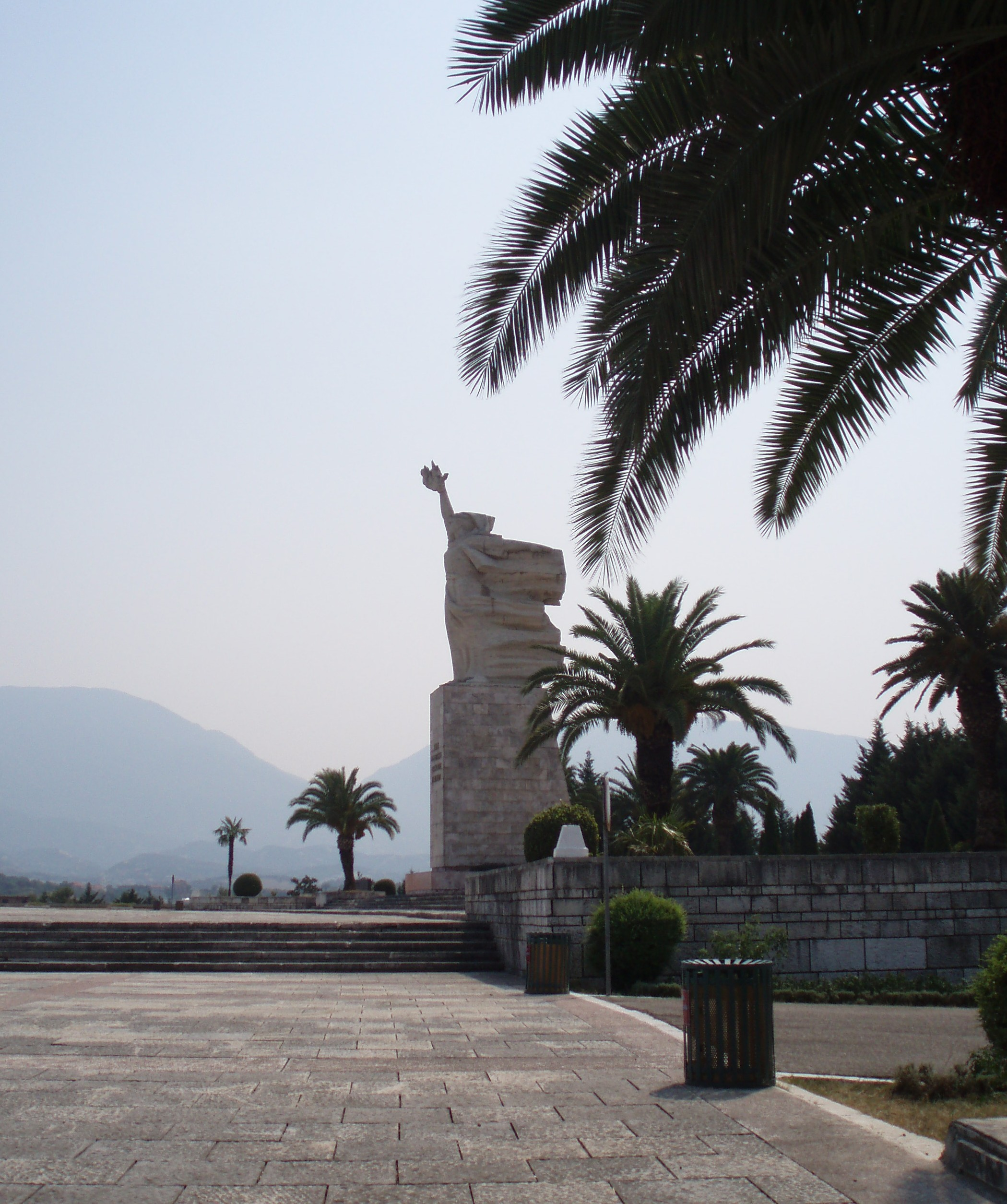

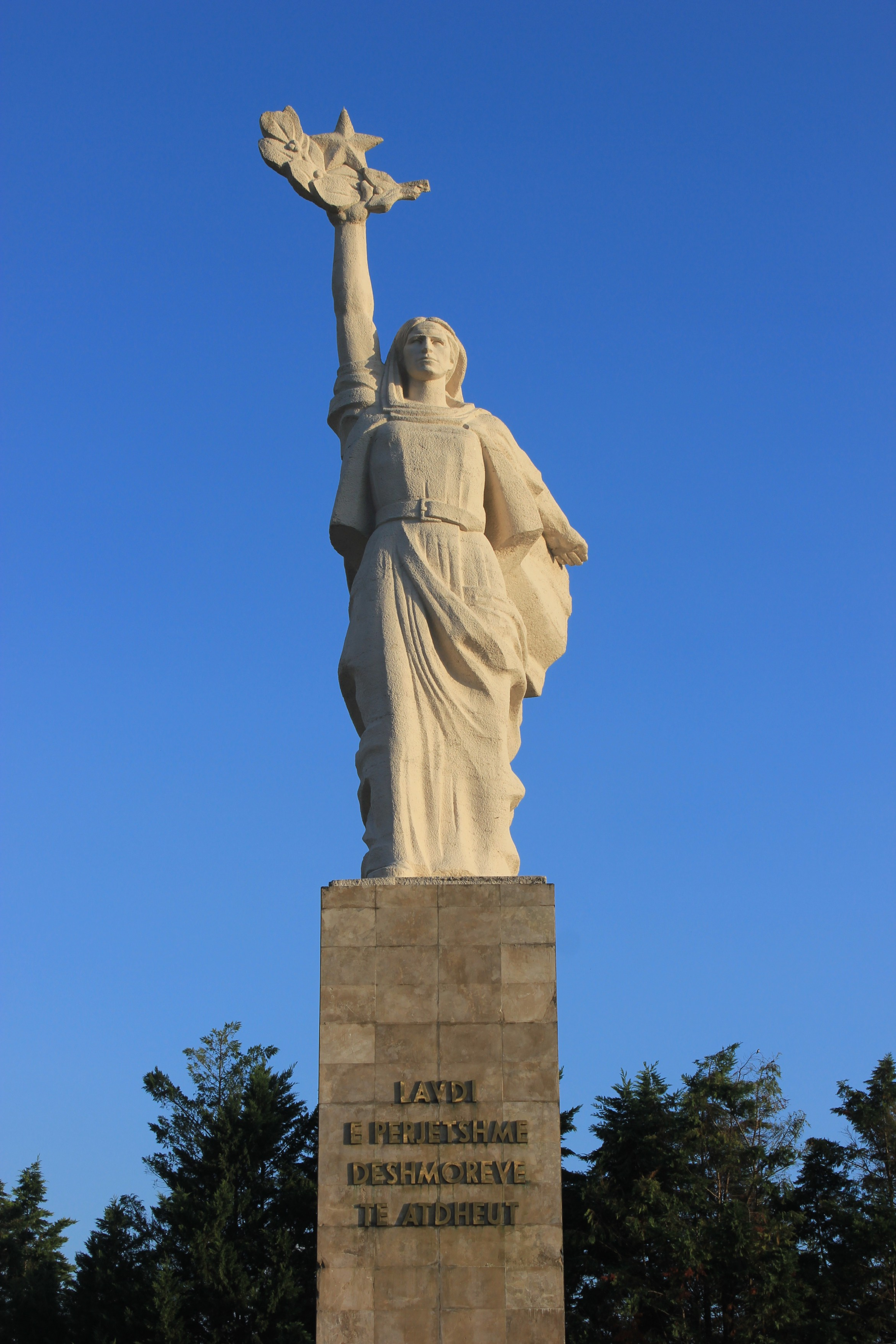

== See also ==
- Tirana
- Landmarks in Tirana
- Tourism in Albania
- Albania
- History of Albania
- National Martyrs' Cemetery of Albania
