= National Martyrs' Cemetery of Albania =

Memorial cemetery in Tirana, Albania

Coordinates: 41.30899°N 19.84050°E

- Varrezat e Dëshmorëve
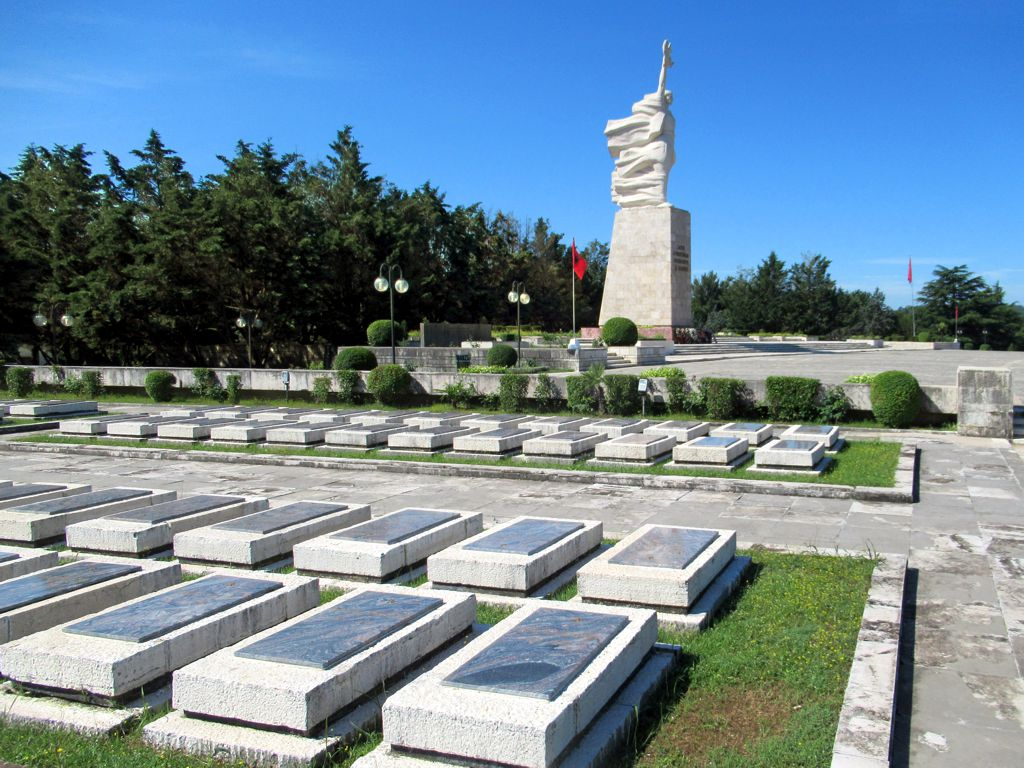
- Statue of Mother Albania
- Interactive map of the National Martyrs' Cemetery of Albania area

General information
- Type: Cemetery
- Location: Rruga e Elbasanit, Tirana, Albania
- Completed: 1971
- Owner: Municipality of Tirana

Design and construction
- Architect: Prof. Besim Daja
- Main contractor: The Government of Albania

The National Martyrs' Cemetery of Albania (Albanian: Varrezat e Dëshmorëve të Kombit) is the largest cemetery in Albania, located on a hill overlooking Tirana.

The Mother Albania statue is located at the Cemetery. It figuratively represents the country as a mother guarding over the eternal slumber of those who gave their lives for her. The statue is made of concrete and it is a work of the sculptors Kristaq Rama, Muntaz Dhrami and Shaban Hadëri. It stands atop a 3 m pedestal; is 12 m tall and engraved on the pedestal are the words "Lavdi e perjetshme deshmoreve te Atdheut" ("Eternal Glory to the Martyrs of the Fatherland").

The cemetery was also the resting place of former leader Enver Hoxha, who was subsequently disinterred and given a more humble grave in another public cemetery. The dictator's former resting place has been occupied with the remains of Azem Hajdari, the student leader behind the fight against the regime in the late 1980s who was assassinated in Tirana in 1998.

Some 900 partisans who died during World War II are buried in the cemetery.
