= National Museum of Fine Arts (Albania) =

National art museum in Tirana, Albania

- Official Logo

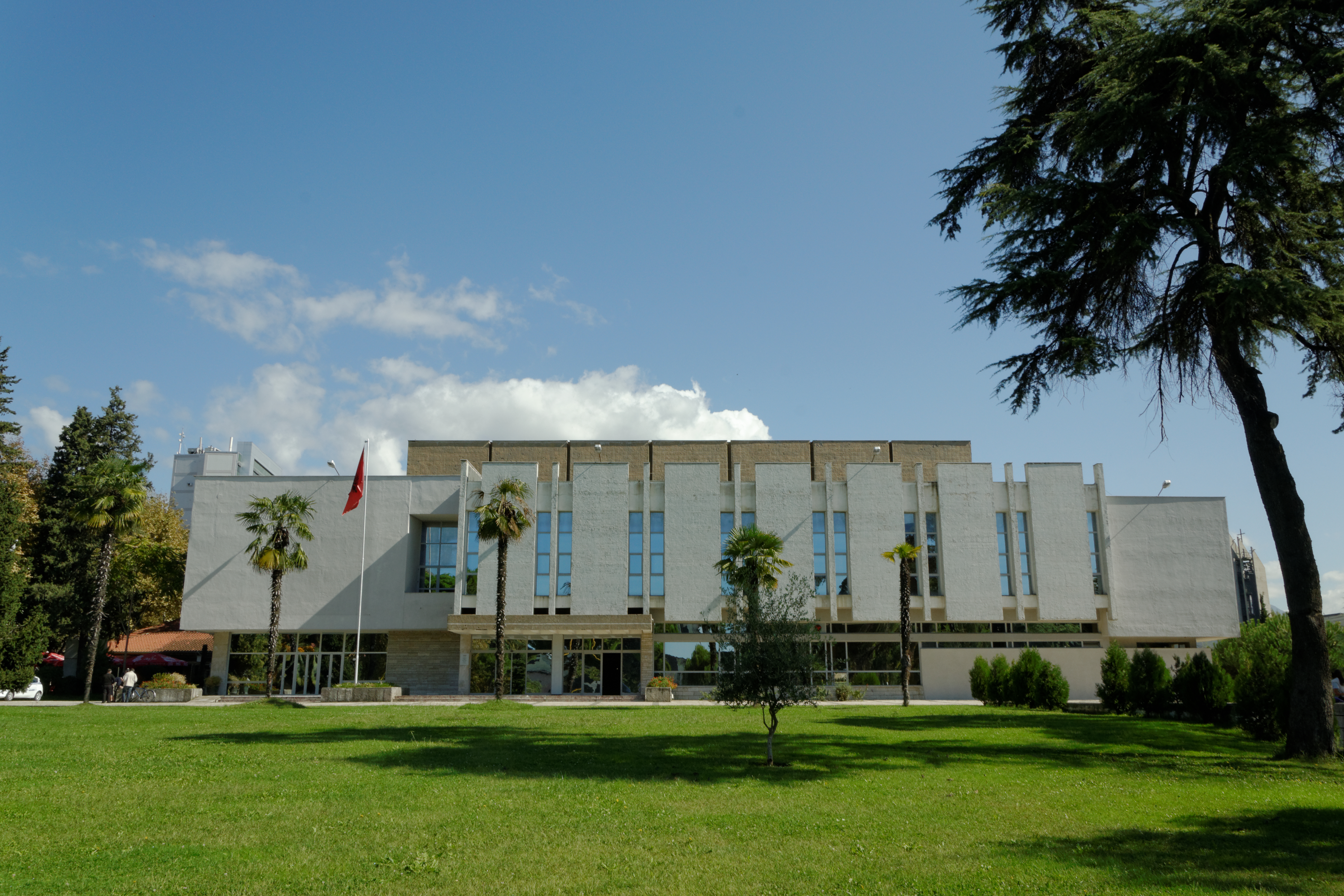
- As seen from Rinia Park
- Established: 1946 (current building opened in 1956); Temporarily closed from October 2021 to December 2023 for renovation
- Location: Rruga Murat Toptani 2; 1001 Tirana, Albania
- Coordinates: 41.325820°N 19.819742°E
- Director: Erzen Shkololli
- Website: galeriakombetare.gov.al

The National Museum of Fine Arts (Albanian: Galeria Kombëtare e Arteve) is a national art museum in Tirana, Albania, under the supervision of the Ministry of Economy, Culture and Innovation. It features the work of well-known Albanian artists such as Kole Idromeno and Sadik Kaceli.

In October 2021, the gallery was temporarily closed to allow for significant construction work to take place such as the revamping of the current structure and the building of a new one nearby. The works are expected to last until end of 2023. In the meantime, plans include the digitization of art work at the AlbaFilm studios.

== History ==
The beginnings of the institution can be traced back to the endeavors of a group of Albanian artists and the Arts Committee of 1946. Pinakoteka was the first institution of fine arts in the country. After much toil and extensive efforts, the Gallery of Arts officially opened to the public in Tirana on 11 January 1954. The gallery worked in two main directions: exhibiting the permanent collection and opening temporary exhibitions of Albanian and foreign artists. The new visions on the development and display of fine arts, as well as the new acquisitions increased the number of artworks at the gallery's disposal and brought about the need for a larger and more functional new building.

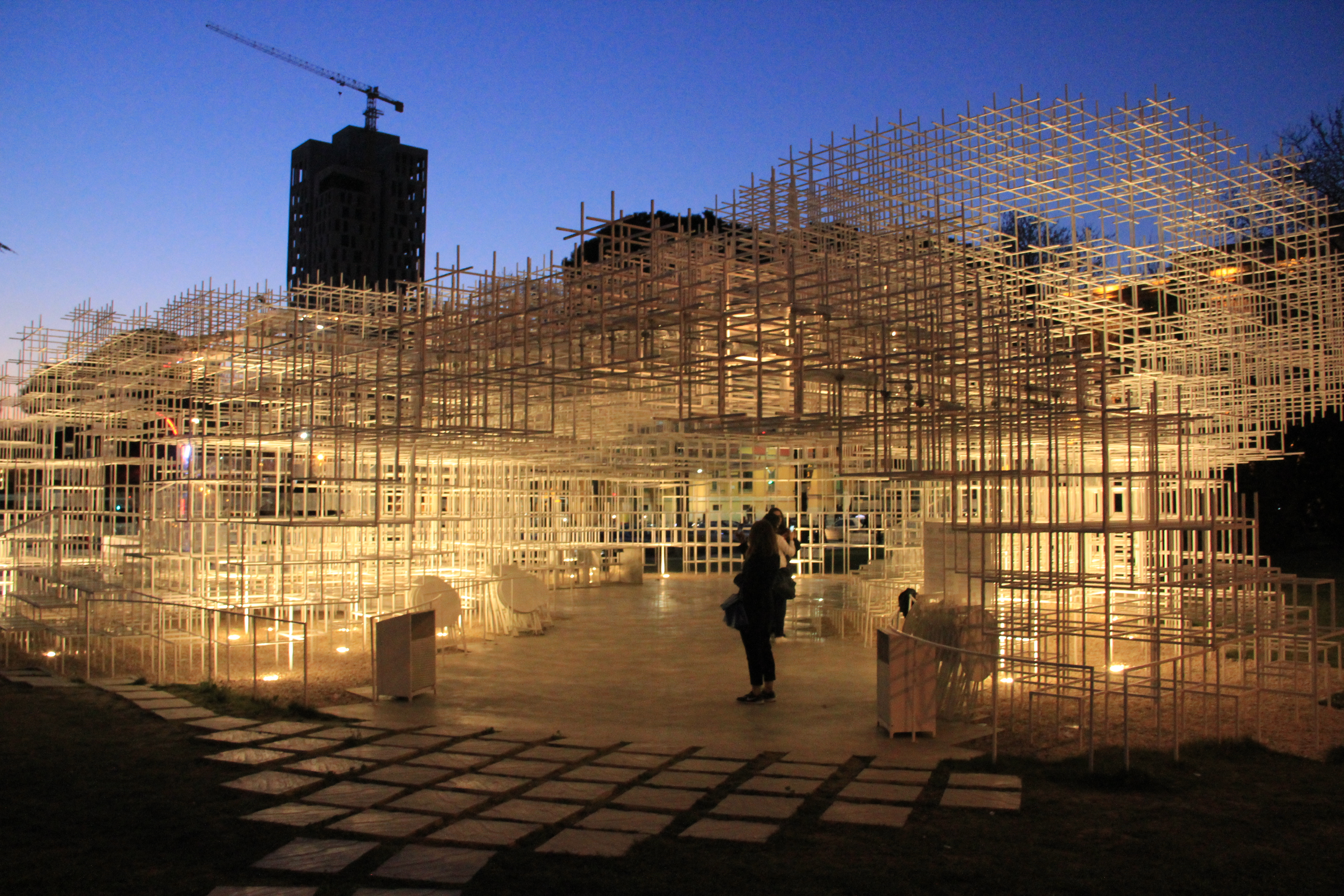
The Cloud Pavilion outside the National Art Gallery

The new venue opened on 29 November 1974. It was situated on the "Martyrs of the Nation" Boulevard and it is the existing building where the National Gallery of Arts stands today. This new opening is the moment of reorganization and of the first rebuilding programme which consisted in establishing an administrative structure made up of several departments dealing with artistic activities. The fund of the new gallery, up to this time, counted 340 artworks and its archives counted 240 registered artists. From this moment onwards the Gallery of Arts functions as the only and most important national institution of exhibiting, conserving, studying, restoring, publishing, documenting and archiving the works of art in Albania.

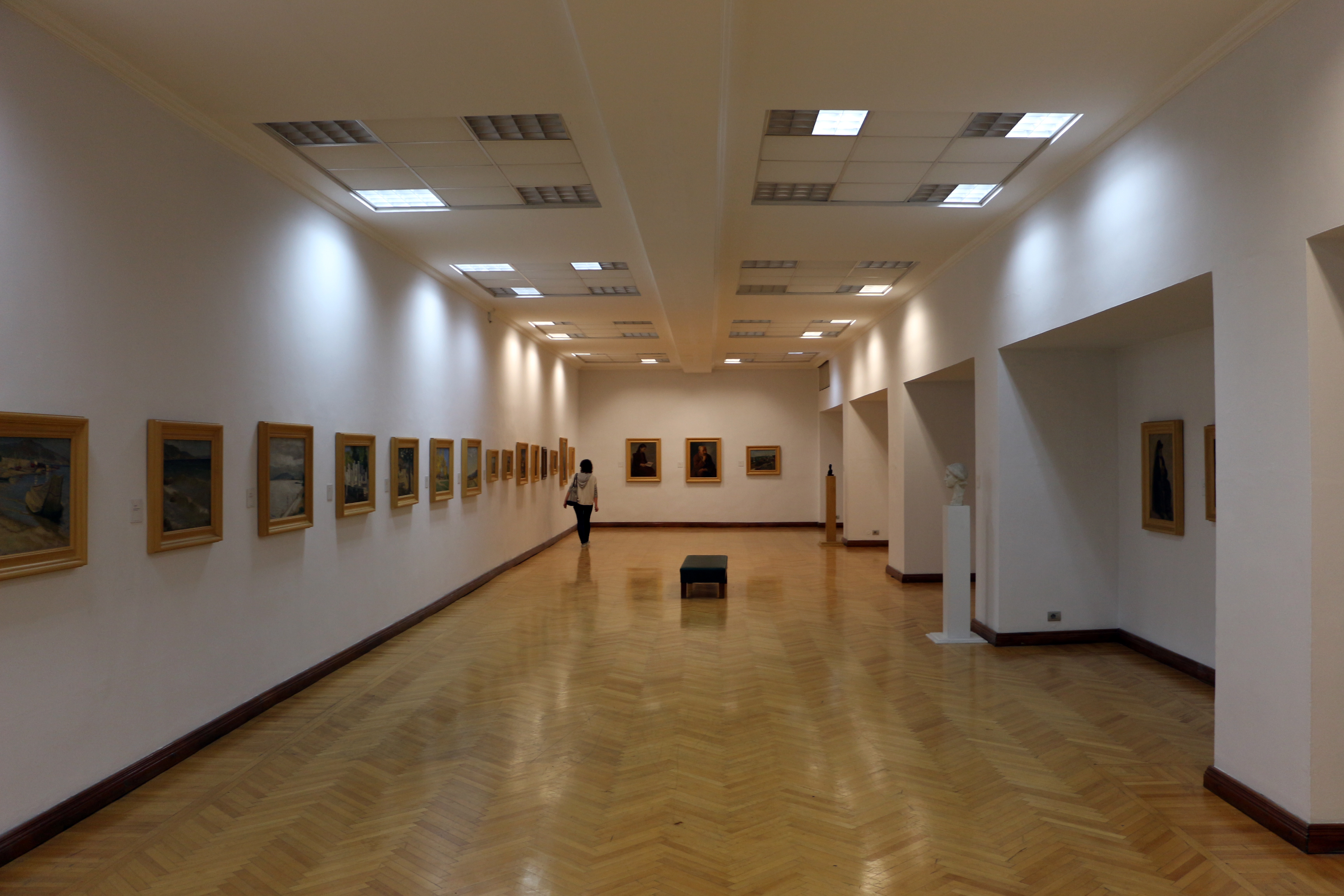
Inside the gallery

In 2009 and 2010, the National Gallery of Arts underwent important renovation works through a series of considerable private and public investments, which consisted in a qualitative reconstruction of interior spaces, aiming to preserve the original architectural project as much as possible.

As part of the major reconstruction of the National Gallery, it has also been showing the permanent collection in May 2009, through a new visualizing concept, aiming to a better dissemination, education and information on cultural matters, for an ever increasing Albanian and international public.

Today the National Gallery preserves/ conserves over 5,000 artworks. Besides the permanent collection which is focused on Socialist Realism art, famous Albanian artists, international ones and important collections have been part of the different exhibitions in the National Gallery of Arts. An important policy of the NGA activities are also the educational programs, where many children and students participate.

Visitors of the National Gallery have the opportunity to enjoy the activities and the exhibitions' rich program, to know more about Albanian visual art.

== See also ==
- Culture of Tirana
- Landmarks in Tirana
- List of national galleries
- Albanian art
