= Timeline of Tirana =

Tirana is the capital and largest city of Albania. This is a timeline of the history of the city.

== Prior to 20th century ==
- 1418 - First mention of Tirana in Venetian documents.
- 1572 - Tirana mentioned as "Borgo di Tirana" - Tirana-burgh.
- 1600s - City founded.
- 1614 - Sulejman Bargjini built a hammam, bakery, and mosque, transforming the settlement into a commercial center of the area.
- 1700s - Tanners' Bridge is built.
- 1750 - Kokonozi Mosque is built.
- 1780 - St. Procopius church established.
- 1820 - Kapllan Pasha Tomb is built.
- 1822 - Et'hem Bey Mosque and Clock Tower of Tirana built.
- 1865
  - Municipal Council created (approximate date).
  - St. Mary's Catholic Church built.

== 20th century ==
- 1905 - Population: about 12,000.
- 1912 - 26 November: The Albanian flag is raised, two days before the Albanian Declaration of Independence in Vlorë.
- 1913 - Zyber Hallulli becomes mayor.
- 1917 - 28 November: "Streha Vorfnore", the first public orphanage in Albania was established.
- 1918 - 19–20 December: Congress of Tirana took place, a preparatory for the Congress of Durrës.
- 1920 - 9 February: Tirana becomes provisional capital of Albania.
- 1921 - Albanian Vocational School founded.
- 1922
  - National Library headquartered in Tirana.
  - Albanian Orthodox Church gained its independence.
- 1923 - Muslim Community of Albania headquartered in Tirana.
- 1925
  - Bektashi order moved its headquarters in Tirana.
  - 2 September Bank of Albania is founded in Tirana.
  - 31 December: Tirana becomes permanent capital of Albania.
- 1926 - 27 November: Italian-Albanian pact signed in Tirana.
- 1927 - 22 November: Italian-Albanian military pact signed in Tirana.
- 1929 - Orthodox Autocephalous Church of Albania headquartered in Tirana.
- 1930 - Dëshmorët e Kombit Boulevard laid out.
- 1931 - New Bazaar, Tirana is built.
- 1938 - Radio Tirana begins broadcasting.
- 1939
  - Italian occupation begins.
  - Kosovo cinema opens.
  - Sacred Heart Church built.
- 1941
  - Communist Party of Albania headquartered in Tirana.
  - Presidential Palace construction completed.
- 1942 - Zëri i Popullit newspaper begins publication.
- 1943
  - Italian occupation ends.
  - Bashkimi newspaper begins publication.
- 1945 - State Professional Theatre active.
- 1946 - Teachers' college opens.
- 1948 - National Archaeological Museum opened.
- 1949 - Durrës-Tirana railway begins operating.
- 1950 - Rinia Park created.
- 1951
  - Higher Agricultural Institute established.
  - Polytechnic University of Tirana established.
- 1953 - National Theatre of Opera and Ballet of Albania founded.
- 1954 - Gallery of Figurative Art opens.
- 1955/56 - Grand Park of Tirana built.
- 1957 - State University of Tirana established.
- 1958 - Armed Forces Academy (Albania) is established.
- 1961 - Zoopark Tirana opens.
- 1963 - Palace of Culture of Tirana built.
- 1964 - Botanical Gardens of Tirana opens.
- 1966 - High Institute of Arts founded.
- 1968 - Skanderbeg Monument erected in Skanderbeg Square.
- 1971 - University's Botanical Gardens of Tirana created.
- 1972 - Academy of Sciences of Albania headquartered in city.
- 1979
  - Tirana International Hotel opened.
  - Population: 189,000.
- 1981 - National History Museum opens.
- 1986 - Palace of Congresses built.
- 1988
  - International Center of Culture opens.
  - Enver Hoxha statue erected.
- 1989 - Population: 238,057.
- 1990 - December: Student strike.
- 1991
  - Koha Jonë newspaper begins publication.
  - Polytechnic University of Tirana active.
  - Confederation of Trade Unions (Albania) headquartered in Tirana.
  - Tirana International School founded.
  - Enver Hoxha's statue is torn down by protesters.
- 1992 - Prefecture of Tirana created.
- 1995 - Rogner Hotel Tirana opens.
- 1996 - Tirana Bank founded.
- 1997 - January: Albanian Rebellion of 1997 begins.
- 2000 - Design of Tirana Coat of Arms adopted.

== 21st century ==
- 2001
  - St Paul's Cathedral (Tirana) built.
  - Population: 343,078.
- 2006 - European University of Tirana established.
- 2008 - 10 March: Centre of Albanological Studies established.
- 2009 - ABA Business Center is built.
- 2011
  - January: 2011 Albanian opposition demonstrations.
  - 8 May: Albanian local elections, 2011 held.
  - 26 November: Tirana East Gate shopping mall opens.
  - Lulzim Basha becomes mayor.
  - Population: 418,495.
- 2012
  - Resurrection Cathedral, Tirana built.
  - TID Tower built (approximate date).
- 2013 - University of Medicine opened.
- 2014 - Ambasador III is built.
- 2015
  - Erion Veliaj becomes mayor.
  - Maritim Plaza (luxury hotel) construction completed.
- 2017 - Skanderbeg Square gets renovated.
- 2019 - Arena Kombëtare opens.
- 2021 - Alban Tower is built.
- 2023 - Pyramid of Tirana gets renovated.
- 2024
  - Edi Rama announces plans to create the Sovereign State of the Bektashi Order, an enclaved European microstate within Tirana
  - The Book Building is built.
  - Vertical Forest Tirana is built.
- 2025 - Eyes of Tirana is built.
- 2026
  - 2026 Flamingo Revolution demonstrations.

== See also ==
- Tirana history
- List of mayors of Tirana

== Bibliography ==
=== in English ===
- "Tirana" . Encyclopædia Britannica. Vol. 26 (11th ed.). 1910. p. 1006.
- Herman Felstehausen (1999). Urban growth and land use changes in Tirana, Albania: with cases describing urban land claims (PDF). Albania Series. University of Wisconsin–Madison, Land Tenure Center.
- Gentiana Kera (2009). "Tirana". In Emily Gunzburger Makas; Tanja Damljanovic Conley (eds.). Capital Cities in the Aftermath of Empires: Planning in Central and Southeastern Europe. Routledge. p. 108+. ISBN 978-1-135-16725-7.
- Dorina Pojani [in Albanian] (2010). Tirana: City Profile. Vol. 27.

=== in other languages ===
- Kristo Frashëri [in Albanian] (2004). Historia e Tiranës (in Albanian). Toena. ISBN 9992718978.
