= Tirana's Rock =

Highrise building in Tirana, Albania

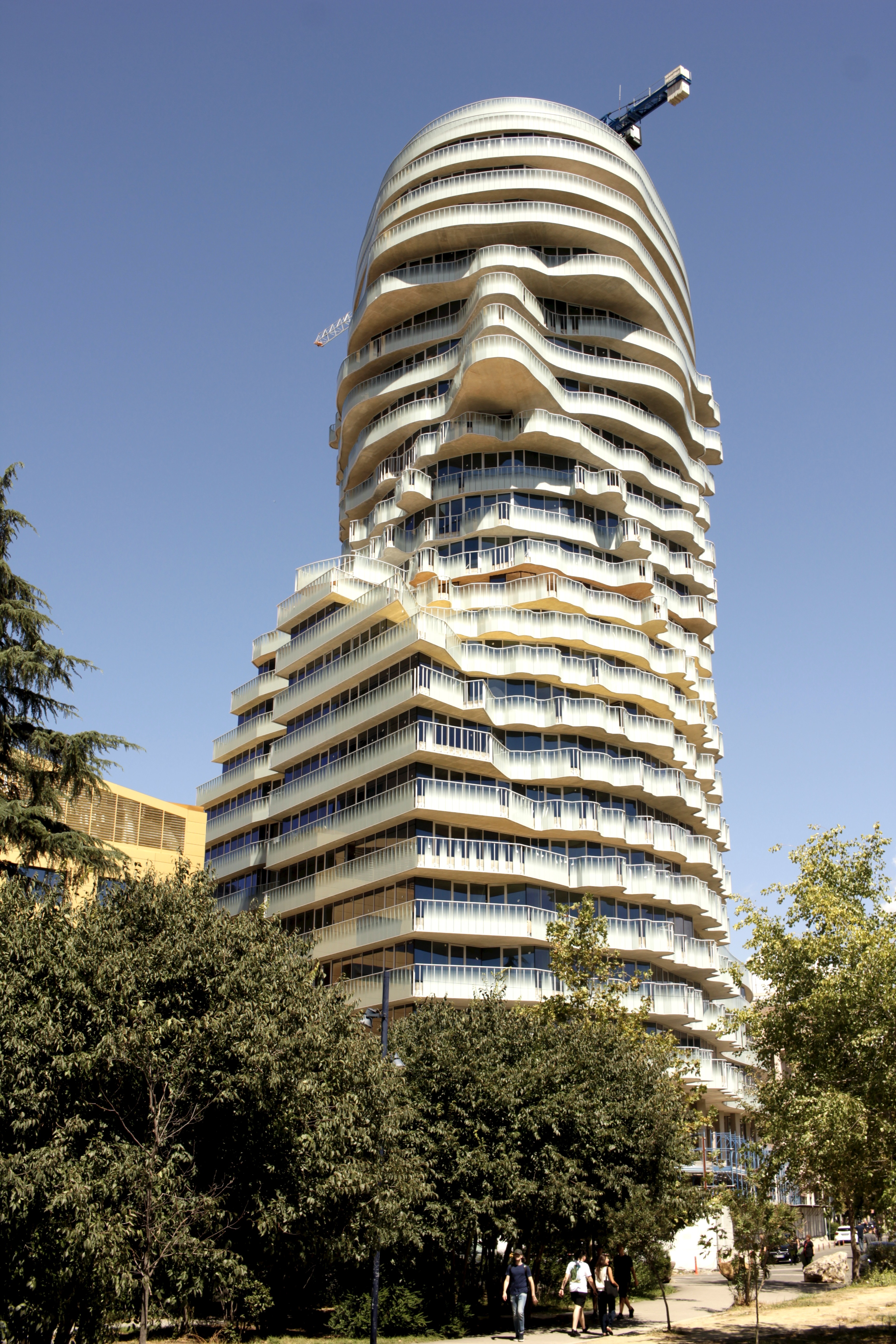
- Interactive map of the Tirana's Rock area

General information
- Status: Under construction
- Type: Mixed-use, Residential, Retail, Office
- Location: Tirana, Albania, Dibër Street
- Coordinates: 41.32999°N 19.81931°E
- Construction started: July 2021

Height
- Roof: 89.5 m (294 ft)

Technical details
- Structural system: Concrete
- Floor count: 26
- Floor area: 35,000 m^{2} (377,000 sq ft)

Design and construction
- Architect: MVRDV
- Main contractor: ANA sh.p.k.

Tirana's Rock is a mixed-use highrise building located in Tirana, Albania. Designed by MVRDV, the tower will stand at its completion at 89.5 meters (294 ft) high divided into 26 floors, and will include residential, commercial, and office spaces. The construction will also be among the world's largest buildings that double as a figurative sculpture. In its case, it will represent the bust of Gjergj Kastrioti (also known as Skanderbeg), one of Albania's Middle Ages main historical figures.

== History ==
Between 2018 and 2020, a suite of old two-story villas were demolished in order to free up space for the incoming "Skanderbeg Building". More specifically, Tirana's municipality demolished all the constructions that remained in the area between the Tirana International Hotel and the Ismail Kadare museum.

== Concept and design ==
The tower was designed with multiple characteristics of sustainable architecture. The balconies of each apartment benefit from built-in planters that let the vegetation around the building rise up through them, using native trees and plants all over. It has many features which ensures it is sustainable in the warm climate of Tirana. The building's excessive sunlight is prevented by its wide projecting balconies while its floor plans enable natural cross-ventilation. Rainwater harvesters and heat recovery systems would reduce water and energy requirements of the building.

Representative of the Organic architecture, the Skanderbeg building was designed to imitate elements in nature by wrapping itself up with curvy irregular balconies. The building will be part of the newly constructed complex of constructions circling the Skanderbeg Square alongside Tirana International Hotel, Intercontinental Hotel Tirana, Maritim Plaza Tirana, Eyes of Tirana and The Book Building. According to MVRDV, the curvy shapes of the building's outer volumetry allow the interior spaces to adapt their proper floor plans which will be slightly different by each floor. The result of the composition is the mixture between art and architecture as part of the post-communist renaissance branch of art belonging to Albania.

The building at night

== See also ==
- List of tallest buildings in Albania
- Landmarks in Tirana
