= List of tallest buildings in Albania =

In 2003, the city of Tirana, headed by then-mayor Edi Rama, had commissioned a masterplan for the redevelopment of the city center. Drafted by Architecture-Studio, the plan envisioned the construction of ten towers, arranged in parallel order around Skanderbeg Square, with an intended maximum height of 85 meters proposed for each tower, so to maintain a cohesive skyline.

Projects such as Alban Tower and Eyes of Tirana deviated from these height restrictions, creating a precedent that led to increased heights for future developments. This change contributed to a progressive trend toward taller and more imposing structures within and around the city’s urban core.

The following list of tall buildings is organized in accordance with the international standards set forth by the Council on Tall Buildings and Urban Habitat (CTBUH).

== Supertalls ==
List of buildings with a minimum height of ~300 m (980 ft).

No.	Name	Image	Location	Height	Floors	Architect	Developer	Year
1	Tirana Society Towers		Tirana; 41.32894°N 19.82104°E	300 m (980 ft)	—	Elemental S.A.	Delta sh.p.k / Techno Alb sh.p.k	ongoing

== Skyscrapers ==
List of buildings with a minimum height of ~150 m (490 ft).

No.	Name	Image	Location	Height	Floors	Architect	Developer	Year
1	Grand Park Skyline I		Tirana; 41.31656°N 19.81910°E	266 m (873 ft)	71	Valerio Olgiati	X One sh.p.k	Yes approved
2	Alana's Tower		Tirana; 41.34426°N 19.81453°E	250 m (820 ft)	62	Herzog & de Meuron	Klar sh.p.k	Yes approved
3	High Rise Tower		Tirana	212 m (696 ft)	47	Shigeru Ban / Jean de Gastines	Matrix Konstruksion sh.p.k	Yes approved
4	Mount Tirana		Tirana; 41.32975°N 19.82054°E	206.4 m (677 ft)	58	CEBRA	Nova Construction sh.p.k	u/c (2030)
5	Reeds Towers		Tirana; 41.32376°N 19.80001°E	205 m (673 ft)	60	Coldefy	Glob 3X sh.p.k	Yes approved
6	Papuli Tower		Tirana; 41.32779°N 19.80768°E	205 m (673 ft)	58	Bofill Arquitectura	Classic S&J sh.p.k	Yes approved
7	ABA Tower		Tirana; 41.31149°N 19.81246°E	—	58	Studio Gang	Gener 2	ongoing
8	Lana Riverside Residences		Tirana; 41.32210°N 19.80248°E	204.45 m (670.8 ft)	56	Marco Casamonti & Partners / X-Plan Studio	Forever Construction sh.p.k	u/c (2031)
9	Barcelona Tower		Tirana; 41.32689°N 19.81628°E	202 m (663 ft)	53	Bofill Arquitectura / UDV Architects	Bami Holding sh.p.k	Yes approved
10	Bond Tower		Tirana; 41.33539°N 19.79661°E	199.5 m (655 ft)	55, 44	OODA	Nova Construction sh.p.k	u/c (2032)
11	Piano Nobile Tower		Tirana; 41.33060°N 19.81742°E	—	—	l'AUC	Veliaj Construction	ongoing
12	L Tower		Tirana; 41.32483°N 19.82259°E	—	—	Steven Holl	Kastrati sh.p.k	ongoing
13	The Needle		Tirana; 41.32314°N 19.82274°E	—	—	—	—	ongoing
14	Grand Park Skyline II		Tirana; 41.31630°N 19.81811°E	192 m (630 ft)	51	Valerio Olgiati	X One sh.p.k	Yes approved
15	Tirana Gate		Tirana; 41.32688°N 19.78756°E	184 m (604 ft)	50, 39, 25	Marco Casamonti & Partners / MVM Architecture	Xh&M sh.p.k / Alfazed sh.p.k / Smart Construction Invest sh.p.k	Yes approved
16	Oricon II		Tirana; 41.33576°N 19.79781°E	180 m (590 ft)	50	Eduardo Souto de Moura + OODA	Oricon Group sh.p.k / Hanxhari Group sh.p.k	Yes approved
17	The 44 Tower		Tirana; 41.33518°N 19.79973°E	174 m (571 ft)	44	Coop Himmelb(l)au	Ultra–Tech sh.p.k	u/c (2029)
18	Diellon Tower		Tirana	—	—	Oppenheim Architecture	ASR Invest sh.p.k	ongoing
19	Tirana Crevices		Tirana; 41.33662°N 19.81807°E	160 m (520 ft)	49	Cityförster	Edicom sh.p.k	Yes approved
20	Mixed-use Tower		Tirana	—	45	–	Roen Company sh.p.k	ongoing
21	Sunrise Tower		Tirana	—	45	—	Braka Construction sh.p.k	ongoing
22	Taban Tower		Tirana; 41.33241°N 19.80163°E	159 m (522 ft)	43	Dominique Perrault	Tabi Construction	Yes approved
23	Tirana New Boulevard		Tirana; 41.34207°N 19.81392°E	159 m (522 ft)	44, 41	Marco Casamonti & Partners	Smart Construction Invest sh.p.k / Progeen sh.p.k	Yes approved
24	Downtown One		Tirana; 41.32412°N 19.82386°E	150 m (490 ft)	40	MVRDV	Kastrati sh.p.k	2024
25	Grand Park Skyline III		Tirana; 41.31634°N 19.81872°E	150 m (490 ft)	40	Valerio Olgiati	X One sh.p.k	Yes approved
26	Sun Moon Star		Tirana; 41.33562°N 19.81540°E	149.76 m (491.3 ft)	44	Sam Chermayeff	AL Point sh.p.k	u/c (2030)

== Highrises ==
List of buildings with a height variance from ~100 m (330 ft) up to ~149 m (489 ft).

No.	Name	Image	Location	Height	Floors	Architect	Developer	Year
1	New Boulevard Tower		Tirana; 41.34000°N 19.81452°E	145.4 m (477 ft)	39	Oppenheim Architecture	Tirana 2-Konstruksion sh.p.k	u/c (2028)
2	Colosseum 339		Tirana; 41.31959°N 19.80738°E	144 m (472 ft)	36	Luca Dini	Belhaus sh.p.k / Colosseo Construction sh.p.k	Yes approved
3	Vertical Hora		Tirana; 41.33027°N 19.80212°E	142.26 m (466.7 ft)	41	OODA	Develalb Construction sh.p.k / Edonil Konstruksion sh.p.k	u/c (2030)
4	Tirana Fik-Park		Tirana; 41.34437°N 19.81299°E	136 m (446 ft)	40	Fuksas	Usluga sh.p.k	Yes approved
5	Mixed-use Tower		Tirana	—	40	—	Green Living Company sh.p.k	Yes approved
6	Lift Tower		Tirana; 41.32895°N 19.80206°E	—	39	Baukuh	—	ongoing
7	Farol Tower Residence		Tirana; 41.33527°N 19.80380°E	—	38	Camilo Rebelo Associates / Common Sense Studio	Gjoka Konstruksion sh.p.k	Yes approved
8	Lake Diamond Tower		Tirana; 41.31304°N 19.81525°E	—	37	Diller Scofidio + Renfro	Texas Development sh.p.k	ongoing
9	Axa Tower		Tirana; 41.33908°N 19.81474°E	—	37	—	Stela Konstruksion sh.p.k	Yes approved
10	Tirana Dancing Towers		Tirana; 41.34129°N 19.81230°E	—	34, 19	—	Orion Construction sh.p.k	ongoing
11	Startek Tower		Tirana	—	34	Bjarke Ingels Group	Startek sh.p.k	Yes approved
12	Lion Residences III		Tirana; 41.33984°N 19.81289°E	—	34	Stefano Boeri	—	Yes approved
13	Eyes of Tirana		Tirana; 41.32851°N 19.81559°E	135 m (443 ft)	31	Henning Larsen ↓ X-Plan Studio	Ideal Construction sh.p.k	2025
14	Gateway Tower		Tirana; 41.34517°N 19.77894°E	135 m (443 ft)	35	Bjarke Ingels Group	—	ongoing
15	InterContinental Hotel Tirana		Tirana; 41.33009°N 19.81832°E	135 m (443 ft)	33	Bolles+Wilson / Atelier 4	Geci sh.p.k	2025
16	East Tower Residence		Tirana; 41.31791°N 19.83270°E	132.2 m (434 ft)	36	Bolles+Wilson	Geo Construction sh.p.k	u/c (2030)
17	Tailor of Tirana		Tirana; 41.33036°N 19.84179°E	—	36	NOA	El&El sh.p.k	u/c (2031)
18	Top Seven Tower		Tirana; 41.33461°N 19.80135°E	130.65 m (428.6 ft)	35	Archea Associati	Top Seven sh.p.k	u/c (2030)
19	Platinum Tower		Tirana; 41.31563°N 19.81782°E	128.52 m (421.7 ft)	35	XDGA	Ferro Beton & Construction sh.p.k	u/c (2029)
20	Lion Residences II		Tirana; 41.33497°N 19.80049°E	127.16 m (417.2 ft)	34	GG-Loop / UDV Architects	UrbAlb sh.p.k	u/c (2028)
21	Pixel Tower		Tirana; 41.32674°N 19.82152°E	123 m (404 ft)	33	Bjarke Ingels Group	Fusha sh.p.k	u/c (2029)
22	Garda Tower		Tirana; 41.31599°N 19.81705°E	120.55 m (395.5 ft)	33	Kuehn Malvezzi	Artech Group sh.p.k / El-Prom sh.p.k	u/c (2030)
23	Lepidoptera Tower		Tirana; 41.33383°N 19.80326°E	—	34	Studio Gang	—	ongoing
24	Parisi i Ri Tower		Tirana; 41.31761°N 19.80718°E	—	35	Oppenheim Architecture	Sara-El sh.p.k	Yes approved
25	Tirana Tower		Tirana; 41.34111°N 19.84385°E	119.34 m (391.5 ft)	34	Oppenheim Architecture	Anchor Investments sh.p.k	u/c (2028)
26	Mixed-use Tower		Tirana	—	34	—	EHW sh.p.k / Lion Construction sh.p.k / Pitagora Konstruksion sh.p.k	Yes approved
27	Mixed-use Tower		Tirana	—	34	—	Ksamil Seaview sh.p.k	Yes approved
28	The Eagle Tirana		Tirana; 41.33081°N 19.78514°E	—	31	Davide Macullo Architects	—	ongoing
29	Mixed-use Tower		Tirana	—	31	—	Concord Investment sh.p.k	Yes approved
30	Triss Tower		Tirana; 41.34104°N 19.81579°E	—	30	—	Invest Society sh.p.k / AM&AN sh.p.k	Yes approved
31	Mixed-use Tower		Tirana	—	30	—	Ere Architecture & Construction sh.p.k	Yes approved
32	One Boulevard Tower		Tirana; 41.34876°N 19.81195°E	—	30, 28, 26	—	G&E Investment sh.p.k	Yes approved
33	Atlas Tower		Tirana; 41.33299°N 19.77690°E	—	33	Sofia Albrigo	Erniku sh.p.k	Yes approved
34	Guri Tower		Tirana; 41.31963°N 19.79544°E	116.6 m (383 ft)	27	Arup	Midha sh.p.k	u/c (2031)
35	Maji Tower		Tirana; 41.34787°N 19.82138°E	—	29, 25	—	Shk Real Estate sh.p.k	ongoing
36	Tirana Marriott		Tirana; 41.31894°N 19.82311°E	112 m (367 ft)	25	Archea Associati	AlbStar sh.p.k	2019
37	Manhattan I		Tirana; 41.33468°N 19.80671°E	108.8 m (357 ft)	30	Archea Associati	Forever Construction sh.p.k	u/c (2030)
38	Alban Tower		Tirana; 41.32610°N 19.81652°E	107 m (351 ft)	25	Archea Associati	Al&Gi sh.p.k	2022
39	Pajtoni Residence		Tirana; 41.34645°N 19.77407°E	105 m (344 ft)	30	RCR Arquitectes	Pajtoni sh.p.k	u/c (2031)
40	Great Ring Rock		Tirana; 41.33567°N 19.78260°E	104.4 m (343 ft)	32	MVRDV	Albus Invest sh.p.k / Loraldo sh.p.k	u/c (2033)
41	Cornerstone Residential		Tirana; 41.33833°N 19.76886°E	103.64 m (340.0 ft)	28	51N4E	Cornerstone sh.p.k	u/c (2034)
42	Bazaar Gate		Tirana; 41.32953°N 19.82273°E	103.65 m (340.1 ft)	27	Bolles+Wilson	Bregu sh.a	u/c (2029)
43	Tirana West Center		Tirana	—	28	—	Tirana West Center sh.p.k	Yes approved
44	IL Bonçe		Tirana; 41.34077°N 19.82821°E	101.5 m (333 ft)	23	Stefano Boeri	IL Bonçe sh.p.k	Yes approved
45	Flower Tower		Tirana; 41.33420°N 19.81895°E	100.54 m (329.9 ft)	25	Office KGDVS	Ober sh.p.k / Kleal Invest sh.p.k / Xhajs Tirana sh.p.k	u/c (2030)
46	Multifunctional Tower Tirana		Tirana; 41.34824°N 19.81204°E	100.35 m (329.2 ft)	27	Chybik+Kristof	2T sh.p.k / Be-Is sh.p.k	Yes approved
47	Im Rezidence		Tirana; 41.31568°N 19.80462°E	—	26, 24, 21	—	TDT & Partners sh.p.k	Yes approved
48	Mixed-use Highrise		Tirana	—	25	—	Trust Construction sh.p.k	Yes approved
49	Mixed-use Highrise		Tirana	—	25	—	Kedinvest sh.p.k	Yes approved

== General Urban Developments ==
List of buildings with a height variance from ~45 m (148 ft) up to ~99 m (325 ft).

=== Tirana ===
No.	Name	Image	Location	Height	Floors	Architect	Developer	Year
1	Shqiponja Square Building		Tirana; 41.34158°N 19.78645°E	98.82 m (324.2 ft)	28, 26, 24	Pepe Gascón / SAAS Architecture	Hein-Invest sh.p.k	u/c
2	Mixed-use Highrise		Tirana	—	27	—	Tirana West Center sh.p.k	Yes approved
3	Eterna Tirana		Tirana; 41.33352°N 19.84768°E	—	26	NeM–Niney at Marcha Architectes	Moa sh.p.k	u/c
4	Mixed-use Highrise		Tirana	—	26	—	Ital-Project sh.p.k	Yes approved
5	Tirana Boulevard		Tirana; 41.34327°N 19.81352°E	97.38 m (319.5 ft)	25	MVRDV / UNO Architects	Sky Invest sh.p.k	u/c
6	Sima Tower		Tirana; 41.31969°N 19.78700°E	96.6 m (317 ft)	28	Christian Kerez	Sima-Com sh.p.k / Alb Vizion Construction sh.p.k	Yes approved
7	United Towers of Tirana		Tirana; 41.31311°N 19.80819°E	95.7 m (314 ft)	25	Marco Casamonti & Partners	Arlis Construction sh.p.k	u/c
8	Urban Oda		Tirana; 41.34075°N 19.78572°E	—	25	—	Salillari sh.p.k	Yes approved
9	Evolve Tower		Tirana; 41.32462°N 19.82614°E	93 m (305 ft)	21	Andrea Caputo	Aron-Edil sh.p.k	u/c
10	Ekspozita Building		Tirana; 41.32295°N 19.81115°E	93 m (305 ft)	24	Mario Cucinella	Titan Konstruksion sh.p.k	u/c
11	A.F.A Tower		Tirana; 41.33046°N 19.82656°E	92.43 m (303.2 ft)	25	Cityförster	Oni & Afa sh.p.k	Yes approved
12	Glow Tower		Tirana; 41.34039°N 19.81839°E	92.34 m (303.0 ft)	25	Taller Hector Barroso	Glob 3x Group sh.p.k	Yes approved
13	Tirana's Rock		Tirana; 41.32999°N 19.81931°E	89.5 m (294 ft)	26	MVRDV	ANA sh.p.k	u/c
14	Wind Tower		Tirana; 41.33801°N 19.78889°E	87.36 m (286.6 ft)	22	UDV Architects	Kastrati Energy sh.p.k	Yes approved
15	Embassy Tower		Tirana; 41.33110°N 19.80620°E	87 m (285 ft)	25	Coldefy	Ultratech & Lunor ltd	ongoing
16	Maritim Hotel Plaza Tirana		Tirana; 41.32778°N 19.82154°E	85 m (279 ft)	24	51N4E	TID Albania	2015
17	Tirana Garden Building		Tirana; 41.32684°N 19.80575°E	85 m (279 ft)	24	Archea Associati	Nova Construction sh.p.k	2023
18	Filigree Tower		Tirana; 41.33632°N 19.83953°E	83.7 m (275 ft)	21	X-Plan Studio	Kuteli sh.p.k	u/c
19	ABA Business Center		Tirana; 41.32023°N 19.82297°E	83 m (272 ft)	21	Bolles+Wilson	Gener 2	2008
20	Ambasador III		Tirana; 41.31834°N 19.82585°E	82 m (269 ft)	23	Atelier 4	Mane TCI	2016
21	Mixed-use Highrise		Tirana	—	23	—	Aghak Cara sh.p.k	Yes approved
22	Ndarja		Tirana; 41.32454°N 19.80645°E	—	24, 23, 22	OODA	Artech Group sh.p.k / Edonil Konstruksion sh.p.k	Yes approved
23	Mixed-use Highrise		Tirana	—	22	—	Constructal sh.p.k / Nova Group sh.p.k	Yes approved
24	Void Tower		Tirana; 41.32788°N 19.82741°E	79.75 m (261.6 ft)	23	Andrea Caputo	A.I.B.A sh.p.k	ongoing
25	Book Building		Tirana; 41.32758°N 19.82023°E	77 m (253 ft)	21	51N4E	Techno-Alb sh.p.k	2024
26	Tirana Jardins		Tirana	—	21, 20, 19	Manuelle Gautrand	Xhajs Tirana sh.p.k	Yes approved
27	Sky Hotel Tirana		Tirana; 41.32236°N 19.81804°E	76 m (249 ft)	20	Ilir Shijaku	Lani sh.p.k	2000 ↓ 2020 (extended)
28	Vertical Forest		Tirana; 41.31814°N 19.82514°E	75 m (246 ft)	21	Stefano Boeri	Gener 2	2024
29	Altura Trade Center		Tirana; 41.34369°N 19.81174°E	—	19	Studio Arch4	Usluga sh.p.k	u/c
30	West Habitat		Tirana	—	19	UDV Architects	—	ongoing
31	Green Tower		Tirana; 41.32322°N 19.81240°E	74 m (243 ft)	18	SOA Architecture	Titan Konstruktion sh.p.k	u/c
32	Mixed-use Building		Tirana	73.8 m (242 ft)	20	Dalmat Architecture	TDT & Partners sh.p.k	Yes approved
33	Nomad Building		Tirana; 41.32487°N 19.80236°E	72.7 m (239 ft)	20	Dalmat Architecture	Artech Group sh.p.k	Yes approved
34	Grey Moon Tower		Tirana; 41.31836°N 19.81299°E	71.55 m (234.7 ft)	18	X-Plan Studio	Babasi Coo sh.p.k	Yes approved
35	Puzzle Tirana		Tirana; 41.31453°N 19.80633°E	71 m (233 ft)	20	NOA / Atelier 4	Texas Development sh.p.k	ongoing
36	Park Avenue		Tirana; 41.34062°N 19.81263°E	70 m (230 ft)	19	Davide Mecullo Architects	Orion Construction sh.p.k	u/c
37	Mixed-use Building		Tirana	—	18	—	Euro Beton Group sh.p.k	Yes approved
38	Mara Palace		Tirana; 41.33379°N 19.82846°E	—	18	—	Am&Zo sh.p.k	Yes approved
39	Tirana Lake		Tirana; 41.31329°N 19.81329°E	68.55 m (224.9 ft)	17	Marco Casamonti & Partners	Building Construction Invest sh.p.k	Yes approved
40	Lake View Residences		Tirana; 41.31106°N 19.81110°E	60–70 m (200–230 ft)	17	JA Joubert	Gener 2	2023
41	White Tower		Tirana; 41.31489°N 19.80650°E	—	17	Dalmat Architecture	Nova Construction sh.p.k	u/c
42	Art N'Lagje		Tirana; 41.33549°N 19.84261°E	—	17, 15, 12, 20, 9, 7	Dalmat Architecture	Aulonamar sh.p.k	u/c
43	Residential Highrise		Tirana	—	17	—	Baholli Construction sh.p.k	Yes approved
44	Kërpudha Tower		Tirana; 41.31965°N 19.82502°E	57.2 m (188 ft)	15	MAD Studio	TDT & Partners sh.p.k	u/c
45	ETC Galeria		Tirana; 41.32405°N 19.82291°E	56 m (184 ft)	16	—	Edil-Al	2006
46	Tirana International Hotel		Tirana; 41.32999°N 19.81861°E	56 m (184 ft)	15	Valentina Pistoli	Albanian State	1979
47	Twin Towers		Tirana; 41.32236°N 19.81972°E	52 m (171 ft)	15	—	TID	2005
48	Residential Highrise		Tirana	51.7 m (170 ft)	14	Stefano Boeri	Domus Group AL sh.p.k	Yes approved
49	MET Building		Tirana; 41.32479°N 19.82090°E	48.7 m (160 ft)	15	Mario Cucinella	MET Invest sh.p.k	2024
50	Illyrius Apartments		Tirana	47.9 m (157 ft)	15	GG-loop	Balfin Group	Yes approved
51	Multifunctional Building		Tirana	—	15	—	Oni & Afa sh.p.k	Yes approved

=== Durrës ===
No.	Name	Image	Location	Height	Floors	Architect	Developer	Year
1	Durrës Waterfront		Durrës	—	47	-	Egr Construction sh.p.k.	Yes approved
2	Durrës Tower		Durrës; 41.30504°N 19.49568°E	—	32, 24	Luca Dini	Rajfi Group sh.p.k	Yes approved
3	Durrësi Tower		Durrës; 41.31284°N 19.44863°E	110 m (360 ft), 90 m (300 ft),66 m (217 ft)	30, 24, 17	XDGA & IRI sh.p.k.	T&Xh sh.p.k.	u/c
4	Rajfi Residence		Durrës; 41.31029°N 19.44367°E	91 m (299 ft)	27	—	Rajfi Group sh.p.k	2018
5	Desla Towers		Durrës; 41.308256°N 19.491278°E	88 m (289 ft), 62 m (203 ft)	25, 17, 9	Andrea Caputo	Desla sh.p.k.	u/c
6	Highrise Building		Durrës; 41.31124°N 19.44952°E	84 m (276 ft)	24	—	—	—
7	Stadium Towers		Durrës; 41.32611°N 19.44972°E	90 m (300 ft). 89 m (292 ft),80 m (260 ft)	22, 22, 19	51N4E / PLAN COMUN	-	ongoing
8	Teuta Tower		Durrës	—	21	-	T & Xh sh.p.k, Badriklo Sh.p.k	Yes approved
9	Currila Towers		Durrës	—	20	-	Autokton Konstruksion sh.p.k.	Yes approved
10	Skalitur Tower		Durrës; 41.31490°N 19.45159°E	77 m (253 ft)	19	Luca Dini	Babasi Coo sh.p.k	u/c
11	Residence		Durrës	—	18	Xplanstudio	Pjeza 2022 sh.p.k	Yes approved
12	Crowne Plaza		Durrës; 41.30850°N 19.44571°E	—	16	FOCUS Architecture	Mediterranean Investment Group	2025
13	Fly Tower		Durrës; 41.30995°N 19.44805°E	58 m (190 ft)	15	—	—	2008

=== Vlorë ===
No.	Name	Image	Location	Height	Floors	Architect	Developer	Year
1	Flamurtari Tower		Vlorë	—	40	—	—	ongoing
2	Mixed-use Highrise		Vlorë	—	39	—	G&E Investment sh.p.k	Yes approved
3	Mixed-use Highrise		Vlorë	—	25, 38	—	Hanxhari Group sh.p.k.	Yes approved
4	Mixed-use Highrise		Vlorë	—	37	—	Hel-Pet sh.p.k / Alb-Edil sh.p.k / Texas Development sh.p.k	Yes approved
5	Vlora Altura		Vlorë	—	34, 36	—	Leon 2011 sh.p.k	ongoing
6	Vlora Landmark Resort		Vlorë; 40.43383°N 19.49553°E	125.5 m (412 ft)	33	Oppenheim Architecture	E&A Investment Vlorë sh.p.k	u/c
7	Vlora Marina Tower		Vlorë; 40.45240°N 19.48206°E	125 m (410 ft)	36	—	—	Yes approved
8	Vlora Central		Vlorë; 40.46639°N 19.48424°E	—	31	Oppenheim Architecture	Anchor Investment sh.p.k	Yes approved
9	Vlore Beach		Vlorë	—	30, 26, 20	—	Feniks Konstruksion sh.p.k	ongoing
10	Mixed-use Highrise		Vlorë	—	28	—	Adriatic Center sh.p.k	ongoing
11	Luzaj Towers		Vlorë; 40.43737°N 19.49826°E	—	24	Coop Himmelb(l)au	—	u/c
12	Mixed-use Highrise		Vlorë	—	24	—	Turi M.Z.B sh.p.k.	Yes approved
13	Mixed-use Highrise		Vlorë	—	24	—	Modeste sh.p.k.	Yes approved
14	Residential Building		Vlorë	—	23	—	En Construction sh.p.k / Dakz sh.p.k	Yes approved
15	Flatiron Vlora		Vlorë; 40.43750°N 19.49689°E	80 m (260 ft)	21, 21	—	Kumi Konstruksion sh.p.k / Semajo sh.p.k	u/c
16	The Leaves		Vlorë; 40.42295°N 19.49296°E	—	16	Davide Macullo Architects	Azure Developments sh.p.k	u/c

=== Other cities ===
No.	Name	Image	Location	Height	Floors	Architect	Developer	Year
1	Rozafa Tower		Shkodër; 42.06708°N 19.51284°E	119.6 m (392 ft)	35	Selgascano + FRPO	Rozafa Group sh.p.k	u/c
2	Saranda Tower		Sarandë; 39.87344°N 19.99437°E	—	32	—	G&P sh.p.k	Yes approved
3	Mixed-use Highrise		Shëngjin	—	23, 30	—	Dimension Construction sh.p.k.	Yes approved
4	Gjirafa Highrise		Shëngjin	—	29	—	Alessio Konstruksion sh.p.k	Yes approved
5	Residential Highrise		Shëngjin	—	26	—	S.T. Konstruksion sh.p.k	Yes approved
6	Shëngjin Arm Tower		Shëngjin; 41.81054°N 19.59736°E	103.5 m (339 ft)	25	—	Ilyonis Constructions sh.p.k	u/c
7	Mixed-use Highrise		Pulaj-Plazh	—	24	—	Euro Sistem sh.p.k	Yes approved

== Towers ==
=== Clock towers ===
Clock towers in Albania were typically situated in the most vibrant and noticeable areas of cities, such as marketplaces, near the main mosques and occasionally even within castles. They were considered landmarks or reference points, in contrast to the neighborhood and the city as a whole. The construction of these important urban structures was driven by a growing demand from the civic society at the time.

No.	Name	Image	Location	Height	Status	Builder	Year
1	Krujë Watchtower		Krujë; 41.50780°N 19.79500°E	17.2 m (56 ft)	Non-operational	Local artisans	11th century
2	Kavajë Clock Tower		Kavajë; 41.18383°N 19.56260°E	23.3 m (76 ft)	Operational	Ibrahim bej Alltuni	1817–1818
3	Tirana Clock Tower		Tirana; 41.32774°N 19.81968°E	32.5 m (107 ft)	Operational	Haxhi Et'hem Beu	1822–1830 ↓ 1930
4	Peqin Clock Tower		Peqin; 41.04592°N 19.75060°E	20.6 m (68 ft)	Operational	—	1823–1841
5	Prezë Clock Tower		Prezë; 41.43149°N 19.67278°E	14.85 m (48.7 ft)	Non-operational	—	1820–1850
6	Libohovë Clock Tower		Libohovë; 40.03277°N 20.26866°E	14 m (46 ft)	Non-operational	Maliq Pasha	1810–1820
7	Shkodër Clock Tower		Shkodër; 42.06807°N 19.51305°E	16.35 m (53.6 ft)	Non-operational	Lord Alfred Paget	19th century
8	Elbasan Clock Tower		Elbasan; 41.11320°N 20.08241°E	19.45 m (63.8 ft)	Operational	Aqif Pasha Elbasani	1899
9	Vlorë Clock Tower		Vlorë; 40.47307°N 19.49100°E	17 m (56 ft)	Operational	Ali Asllani	1937
10	Gjirokastër Clock Tower		Gjirokastër; 40.07475°N 20.14175°E	18.5 m (61 ft)	Operational	Albanian State	1811–1812
11	Korçë Clock Tower		Korçë; 40.61621°N 20.77520°E	17 m (56 ft)	Operational	Local government	2016
12	Berat Clock Tower		Berat; 40.70649°N 19.94040°E	25.44 m (83.5 ft)	Operational	Local government	2018

=== Tower houses ===
The term "kulla" (English: tower) or "kullë e veçuar" (detached tower) refers to a tall, fortified structure designed for various defensive and practical purposes. Detached towers were used as observation posts for monitoring roads or borders, facilitating signal exchanges, serving as fortified residences, and acting as primary towers within fortified cities and castles. They also protected monasteries and functioned as temporary summer dwellings for landowners or as vantage points during agricultural harvests.

No.	Name	Image	Location	Height	Architect	Builder	Year
1	Memory Tower		Kukës; 42.07628°N 20.41640°E	23.5 m (77 ft)	—	Kukës Municipality	2009
2	360° Tower		Divjakë; 40.99012°N 19.48464°E	35 m (115 ft)	—	Divjakë Municipality	2018
3	Red Tower		Korçë; 40.61838°N 20.77746°E	33.5 m (110 ft)	Bolles+Wilson	Korçë Municipality	2014
4	Remembrance Tower		Thumanë; 41.54920°N 19.68012°E	—	—	Krujë Municipality	2022
5	Markagjoni Tower		Shkodër; 42.06499°N 19.51501°E	—	Kolë Idromeno	Gjon Markagjoni	20th century
6	Venetian Tower		Butrint; 39.74405°N 20.01997°E	—	—	Venetians	16th Century
7	Beçe Tower		Turan; 40.61980°N 20.73882°E	15 m (49 ft)	—	—	19th Century
8	Mic Sokoli Tower		Bujan; 42.32535°N 20.07411°E	—	—	—	18th Century
9	Zekate Tower House		Gjirokastër; 40.07489°N 20.13238°E	—	—	—	1812
10	Babameto Tower House		Gjirokastër; 40.07322°N 20.13794°E	—	—	—	—
11	Hupi Tower House		Lepurakë; 41.52796°N 20.29846°E	—	—	—	1820
12	Ngujimi Tower		Theth; 42.38568°N 19.78255°E	—	—	—	—
13	Zuna Tower House		Sohodoll; 41.72476°N 20.39207°E	11 m (36 ft)	—	—	—
14	Dervish Aliu Towers		Dukat; 40.25200°N 19.56808°E	—	—	—	19th century

==== Mirditë ====
The largest concentration of kullas can be found in the historic region of Mirditë, known as the epicenter of catholicism in the country. Its bajraks held considerable influence in the political affairs of pre-independent Albania.

The tower houses of Mirdita were historically built by wealthy and influential families, with the number of floors symbolizing their social status.

Each tower typically featured three, four or more rooms. In the absence of a separate shed, the ground floor was often used to house livestock. A narrow staircase, located just before the main entrance, led to the guest room, which was commonly equipped with a fireplace.

The most prevalent architectural form of fortified dwellings in the Orosh region and its surroundings is the corner plan, achieved by attaching an annex to the primary structure. The annex’s alcoves often housed the sanitary facilities for each floor.

These fortified houses were outfitted with chimneys, but unlike the chimneys in Mat and Dibër, they lacked windows, featuring only turrets. Over time, Mirdita’s çikmata lost their original function as seating areas and became purely defensive architectural elements.

1. Kulla e Bib Kol Arapit
  (Zajs)
2. Kulla e Bib Kol Frrokut
  (Sang)
3. Kulla e Bibajve
  (Bulshizë)
4. Kulla e Brozit
  (Përlat)
5. Kulla e Ded Rramanit
  (Selitë)
6. Kulla e Ded Zef Lekës
  (Katund i Vjetër)
7. Kulla e Dod Gegës
  (Orosh)
8. Kulla e Dod Mark Vokrrit
  (Ulëz)
9. Kulla e Dod Nikoll Gjikollës
  (Kurbnesh)
10. Kulla e Dodajve
  (Përlat)
11. Kulla e Geg Dod Plakut
  (Vilë)
12. Kulla e Gjet Markut
  (Përlat)
13. Kulla e Gjon Mark Bibës
  (Livadhës)
14. Kullat e Karricës
  (Simon)
15. Kulla e Kolmarkajve
  (Bardhaj)
16. Kulla e Kros Gjet Macës
  (Përlat)
17. Kulla e Locit
  (Lufaj)
18. Kulla e Macajve
  (Përlat)
19. Kulla e Mark Bib Tucit
  (Bardhaj)
20. Kulla e Mark Preng Çunit
  (Bardhaj)
21. Kulla e Marka Kulit
  (Bushkash)
22. Kulla e Marndojt
  (Kullaxhi)
23. Kulla e Ndue Bajraktarit
  (Kuzhnen)
24. Kulla e Ndue Bib Vokrrit
  (Fan)
25. Kulla e Ndue Frrokut
  (Ishull-Lezhë)
26. Kulla e Ndue Marka Prendit
  (Katund i Vjetër)
27. Kulla e Ndue Nikoll Jakut
  (Gojan)
28. Kulla e Ndue Preng Syziut
  (Malaj)
29. Kulla e Ndue Përgjonit
  (Kalivaç)
30. Kulla e Ndue Përjakut
  (Pruell)
31. Kulla e Ndue Zef Becit
  (Zajs)
32. Kulla e Nikoll Zefit
  (Nëshejt)
33. Kulla e Palucës
  (Kashnjet)
34. Kulla e Pashajve
  (Gjoçaj)
35. Kulla e Pepkolajve
  (Kthell Epër)
36. Kulla e Pjetër Gjurës
  (Kodër-Spaç)
37. Kulla e Pjetër Ndue Mardoçit
  (Shebe)
38. Kulla e Prend Doçit
  (Rubik)
39. Kulla e Preng Dodës
  (Gëziq)
40. Kulla e Preng Gjurës
  (Spaç)
41. Kulla e Preng Lleshit
  (Mashtërkor)
42. Kulla e Përgjokajve
  (Rubik)
43. Kulla e Përlesit
  (Arisht)
44. Kulla e Përshqefës
  (Bisakë)
45. Kulla e Ricës
  (Shebe)
46. Kulla e Skanajve
  (Mashtërkor)
47. Kulla e Skurës
  (Lam i Madh)
48. Kulla e Topuzëve
  (Fregen)
49. Kulla e Vukajve
  (Kthell Epër)
50. Kulla e Xhec'Ukës
  (Lam i Madh)
51. Kulla e Zef Ndoc Ndrecës
  (Spaç)

==== Dibër ====
1. Kulla e Abdulla Zylfit
  (Kurdari)
2. Kulla e Barçit
  (Lis)
3. Kulla e Dine Hoxhës
  (Muhurr)
4. Kulla e Dullë Çelës
  (Patin)
5. Kulla e Elmas Korbit
  (Gurrë e Madhe)
6. Kulla e Gjinit
  (Shulbatër)
7. Kulla e Halit Bucit
  (Mustafë)
8. Kulla e Imer Kurtit
  (Gurrë e Vogël)
9. Kulla e Llagjaçeve
  (Strikçan)
10. Kulla e Mehmet Safës
  (Kurdari)
11. Kulla e Moçme
  (Fshat)
12. Kulla e Satajve
  (Kurdari)
13. Kulla e Sufe Lacit
  (Reç)
14. Kulla e Sul Lëkursit
  (Gur i Bardhë)
15. Kulla e Sul Hupit
  (Dushaj)
16. Kulla e Sulejman Tollës
  (Fushë Lurë)
17. Kulla e Shaban Zajmit
  (Shulbatër)
18. Kulla e Zef Doçit
  (Fushë-Lurë)

=== Industrial towers ===
No.	Name	Image	Location	Height	Status	Builder	Year
1	Nickel Mine Towers		Prrenjas; 41.06710°N 20.53879°E	52 m (171 ft)	Decommissioned	Albanian State	1966

== See also ==
- List of tallest structures in Albania
- List of tallest buildings in Kosovo
- List of tallest buildings in Europe
