= The Book Building =

Highrise building in Tirana, Albania

Book Building
- Interactive map of the Book Building area

General information
- Status: Completed
- Type: Mixed-use
- Location: Tirana, Albania, 28 Nëntori Street
- Coordinates: 41.32758°N 19.82023°E
- Completed: 2024

Height
- Roof: 77 m (253 ft)

Technical details
- Structural system: Concrete
- Floor count: 21
- Floor area: 24,000 m^{2} (258,000 sq ft)

Design and construction
- Architect: 51N4E
- Main contractor: Techno-Alb Sh.p.k

The Book Building is a mixed-use highrise building located in Tirana, Albania. Designed by 51N4E and completed in 2024, the tower stands at 77 meters (253 ft) tall, being divided into 21 floors, and displays residential, commercial, and office spaces. The building will be part of the newly constructed complex of constructions circling the Skanderbeg Square alongside Tirana International Hotel, Intercontinental Hotel Tirana, Maritim Plaza Tirana, Eyes of Tirana and Skanderbeg Tower. The nickname of "Book Building" comes from its volumetry which displays vitrations similar to a thick book full of bookmarks.

The tower takes part of the so-called "turbo-capitalist" modernization program of Tirana's central ward.

== See also ==
- List of tallest buildings in Albania
- Landmarks in Tirana
