= Tirana Garden Building =

Highrise building in Tirana, Albania

- Interactive map of the Tirana Garden Building area

General information
- Status: Completed
- Type: Mixed-use, Residential
- Location: Tirana, Albania, Kavaja Street
- Coordinates: 41.32684°N 19.80575°E
- Construction started: March 2018
- Completed: February 2021

Height
- Roof: 85 m (279 ft)

Technical details
- Structural system: Concrete
- Floor count: 24 (+4 underground)
- Floor area: 65,000 m^{2} (700,000 sq ft)

Design and construction
- Architect: Archea Associati
- Main contractor: Nova Construction

Tirana Garden Building is a mixed-use highrise building located in Tirana, Albania. Designed by Archea Associati, the B-shaped building has two high-rising towers which peak at a top height of 85 meters (297 ft) and 24 floors with the tallest tower. Opened in 2021, the building complex displays residential suites and commercial spaces.

== Architecture ==
Located at 800 meters away of the central square of Tirana, the building complex also offers, besides residential functions, educational services and commercial spots such as restaurants and cafes. The residential suites mainly display of four-room duplex apartments. The commercial spaces are divided into three separate floors above the ground.

Designed as a green building, the volumetry of the building benefits from a self-sustainable outer grid-like structure meant to permit vegetation to spread around itself, improving the environmental characteristics of living in the complex and establish a bonding with nature in an ecological manner.

== See also ==
- List of tallest buildings in Albania
- List of tallest buildings in the Balkans
- Landmarks in Tirana
