= Downtown One =

Skyscraper in Tirana

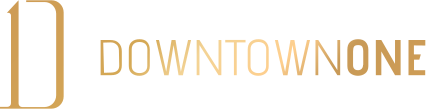

General information
- Status: Under construction
- Type: Mixed-use, Residential, Office
- Location: Tirana, Albania, Bajram Curri Boulevard
- Coordinates: 41.32412°N 19.82386°E
- Construction started: 2019
- Topped-out: 2020
- Completed: 2024 (scheduled)

Height
- Roof: 150 m (490 ft)

Technical details
- Structural system: Concrete
- Floor count: 40 (+5 underground)
- Floor area: 77,000 m^{2} (829,000 sq ft)

Design and construction
- Architect: MVRDV
- Structural engineer: LEAL & Arup
- Main contractor: Kastrati Group

Website
- www.dt1.al

Downtown One is a mixed-use skyscraper in Tirana, Albania. Topped out in 2020, the tower rises to a height of 150 m (490 ft) It is the tallest building in Albania.

The building hosts a hotel, serviced apartments and office space. It is the first structure in Albania to achieve LEED Gold precertification.

== Architecture ==
MVRDV, the architectural firm responsible for the planning of Downtown One, conceived the project as a symbol of Albania’s progress and growth. Located in central Tirana on Bajram Curri Boulevard, south of Lana River, the rectilinear tower incorporates a series of cantilevered houses and offices on its main façades, creating a relief pattern that, when viewed from a distance, forms an abstract map of Albania, with each cantilever representing a specific village or town.

At its base is the "7 Xhuxhat" park, featuring local vegetation and a playground. Commercial spaces occupy the ground floor, while underground levels are designated for parking. The lower half of the tower is dedicated to office space, with the top 18 floors reserved for residential apartments.

MVRDV partnered with local architects and engineers, adhering to the latest Building Information Modeling (BIM) standards. It was designed for structural integrity against earthquakes.

Arup served as the structural and MEP supervisor, with Albanian firms Elteknik providing MEP engineering and LEAL handling structural engineering. DEA Studio acted as local partner and co-architect.

== See also ==
- List of tallest buildings in Albania
- Landmarks in Tirana

Records
Preceded by InterContinental Hotel Tirana	Tallest building in Albania; 2024–present	Succeeded by Incumbent
