= Vertical Forest Tirana =

Highrise building in Tirana, Albania

- Pylli Vertikal (Albanian)
- Interactive map of the Vertical Forest Tirana area

General information
- Status: Under construction
- Type: Mixed-use, Residential
- Location: Tirana, Albania, Rruga Dervish Hima 3, Tirana, Albania
- Coordinates: 41.31814°N 19.82514°E
- Construction started: 2017
- Completed: 2024

Height
- Roof: 75 m (246 ft)

Technical details
- Structural system: Reinforced concrete
- Floor count: 21 (+4 underground)

Design and construction
- Architect: Stefano Boeri
- Developer: Gener 2
- Structural engineer: LEAL-CSE

Vertical Forest Tirana (Albanian: [Pylli Vertikal]; transl. Vertical Forest) is a mixed-use highrise building located in Tirana, Albania. The tower stands at a total of 75 metres (246 ft) tall being divided into 21 floors and is expected to be completed in the third quarter of 2024.

== Architecture ==
=== Concept ===
As its very name suggests, the building embodies the concept of progressive Urban forestry for cities. The tower shares one common wall with the previously built Ambasador III Tirana, coming short of it to 7 meters. It was featured in Tirana's 2030 Materplan which mainly aimed to bring an increase in green and wooded surfaces in the central areas of the city. It was designed as a self-sustainable Green building displaying a total of 3,200 plants and 145 trees on the façades, which, according to the main architects, gives the building the impression of "opening like a flower".

The building has a total of 21 above ground floors and 4 underground, and will host 105 apartments when completed. The balconies share a design which points out the accentuatation of the building's boundaries extend outwards. The architects resolved this challenge with an intersection of the slabs between the floors which specifically rotate in opposite directions each. This feature aims to accentuate the movement of the façade and allowing the planting of further tall trees.

== See also ==
- List of tallest buildings in Albania
- Landmarks in Tirana
