= Universal Hospital Tirana =

Coordinates: 41°19′13″N 19°47′4.4″E

- Ege Saglik Tesisleri ve Egitim Muesseseleri AS

Geography
- Location: Tirana, Albania

Services
- Beds: 120

Links
- Lists: Hospitals in Albania

The Universal Hospital Tirana is a 120-bed hospital on Kavajë Street in western Tirana, Albania, offering medical services. Services are available 24 hours per day, 7 days per week. Universal Hospital Tirana is one of the largest and the most comprehensive private hospitals in the country. The hospital belongs to Ege Saglik Tesisleri ve Egitim Muesseseleri AS, a Turkish company based in Izmir/Turkey and the majority shareholder of this company is Universal Saglik Yatirimlari Holding, again a Turkish company based in Istanbul/Turkey and chaired by Azmi Ofluoglu.

Universal Tirana has a main hospital building which houses all inpatient facilities such as patient rooms, two catheterization laboratories, 5 surgical operating suites, intensive care, emergency services, nursery and neonatology, and labor and delivery. The main building also has outpatient services such as the Clinical Laboratory Services, Radiology, and Physical Therapy. The Polyclinic building contains various outpatient services from lasik surgery to dialysis.

Universal Hospital Tirana's Clinical Laboratory has the capacity to serve over 500 patients per day and produce 10,000 analyses per day using the equipment from around the world. The lab is also a reference lab, which operates at international standards.
