= Kavajë Clock Tower =

- Kulla e Sahatit të Kavajës
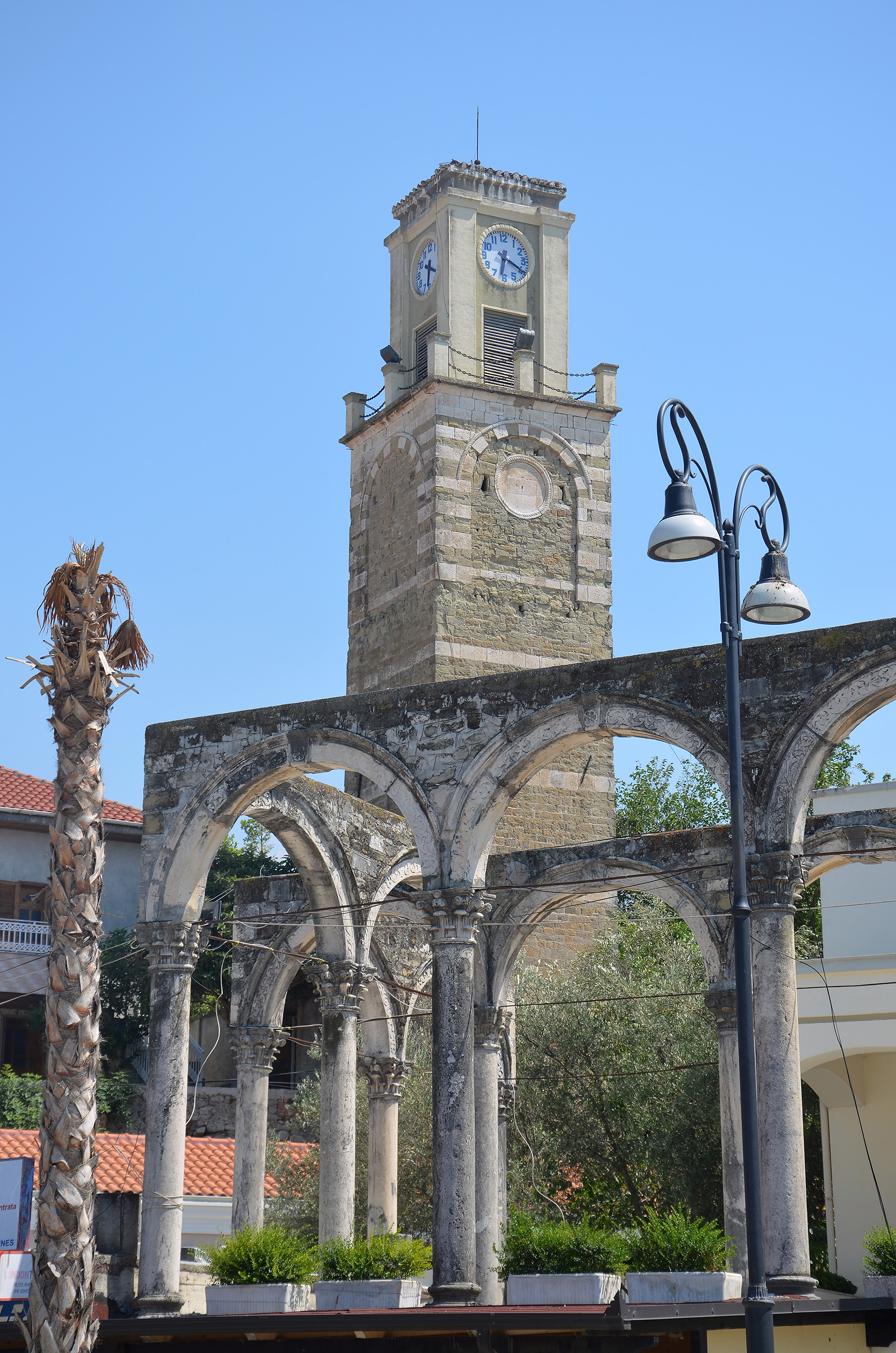
- Clock Tower of Kavajë
- 41.18383°N 19.56260°E
- Type: Clock tower
- Location: Kavajë, Albania

History
- Founder: Ibrahim bey Alltuni
- Built: 1817–1818

Site notes
- Height: 23.3 m (76 ft)
- Architectural style: Ottoman style
- Restored: 2018
- Owner: Municipality of Kavajë

Cultural Monument of Albania
- Type: Cultural
- Criteria: Cat. I
- Designated: 17 March 1948

The Clock Tower of Kavajë (Albanian: Kulla e Sahatit të Kavajës) is a monument of cultural heritage from the late Ottoman period located in Kavajë, Albania. It was recognized as a cultural heritage site (cat. I) by the Institute of Sciences through decision no. 586, dated March 17, 1948.

== History ==
Historical records of 17th century Kavajë are derived from the written accounts of Ottoman explorer Evliya Çelebi, who visited the town in 1670. He described a picturesque settlement situated on a broad, flat and fertile plain at the edge of a bay extending from the gulf, surrounded by lush gardens and vineyards. It had 400 one- and two-story terraced houses made of stone, with tiled roofs and charming gardens, ponds and fountains. The town was organized into four quarters and included four congregational mosques, two madrassas, three mekteps, two dervish tekkes and a bustling bazaar with 200 properly maintained shops.

In 1829, G.B. Margaroli, in his dictionary "La Turchia ovvero l’Impero Ottomano", highlighted the stone construction and notable architectural features of the town’s main buildings. During the 19th century, Kavajë was visited by several European dignitaries, namely: David Urquhart (1831), Joseph Müller (1838), Georg von Hahn (1847–1850) and Hyacinthe Hecquard (1858), all of whom provided statistical data on the local population but did not mention the clock tower.

English painter Edward Lear was the first to document the clock tower, capturing it in three pencil drawings on October 12, 1848.

The precise date and history of the clock tower's construction are detailed in a chronogram found on its western side. The Ottoman text, translated into Albanian by orientalist Vexhi Buharaja, reads:

“Praise be to God, the time has come to build the (tower) of the clock. The reconstruction is a blessing to Mir Ibrahim. Oh God, protect the builder and safeguard him from dangers! (To find the year) count the word tarikh, add two (letters), and then he (to whom such a thing happens) remains an orphan.”

Although the descriptive language may seem somewhat unintelligible today, it likely held a meaning of significance at the time.

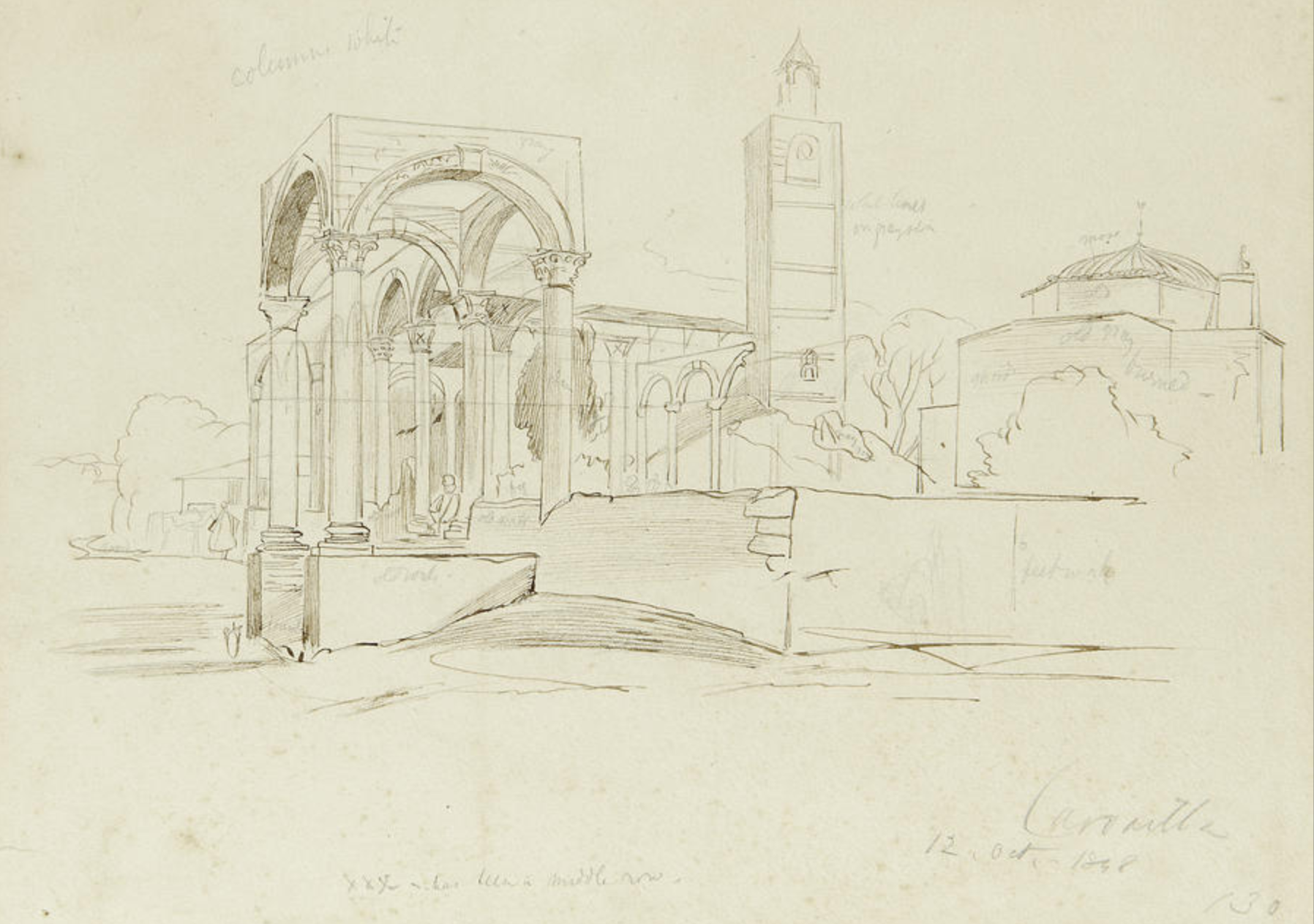
Pencil drawing of the clock tower and Kubelie mosque by Edward Lear (October 12, 1848).

Above the inscription is the word barakallah (used to express gratitude), while mashallah (an expression of awe or beauty) appears on the southern side. A fourth inscription, located on the tower’s bell, reads: OPUS CANCIAN. DALLA VENEZIA – VENETUS ~ (it is the work of the Cancani from Venice)

The clock tower is attributed to local ruler Ibrahim bey Alltuni and was designed to measure time with a sound mechanism. Local traders, who maintained commercial ties with European cities, brought a clock mechanism to the tower, which initially lacked a face and functioned primarily as an auditory timekeeper.

The walling of the three arched windows as well as the installation of the sundial (if we were to call it so) on the west face of the tower, are thought to have been added at a later time.

The sundial served an essential role in daily life. At noon, sunlight would pass through the central pit of the circular white stone on the west face, signaling shop closures, lunch breaks, or the afternoon prayer (Albanian: namazi i ylesë).

An alternate theory suggests that the white stone was not a sundial but a tool for clock calibration. Sunlight entering the 12 cm hole remained static for twelve minutes, enabling the clockkeeper to adjust the clock. These corrections were made biannually, on March 21 and September 23, coinciding with the spring and autumn equinoxes, when day and night are of equal length.

== Architecture ==
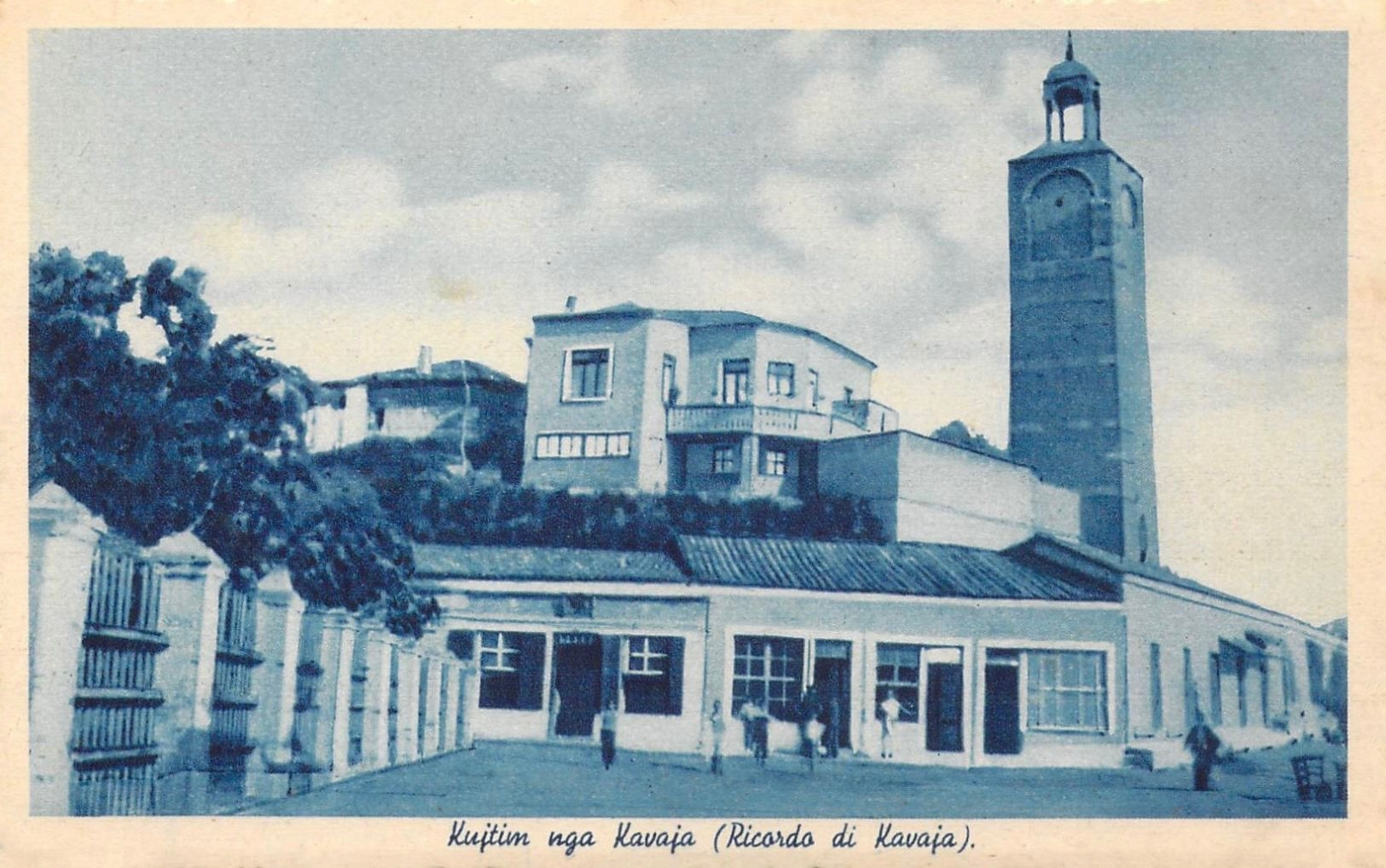
Depiction of the clock tower in a 1939 postcard.

The clock tower of Kavajë is a type II clock tower, characterized by two floors and represents the second variant of this type. (Note: A type II clock tower consists of two floors. The first floor is tall and enclosed by sturdy stone walls, providing space for the movement of the weight stones. The second floor is open, supported by four wooden or stone columns, topped with a roof.) Standing 3.5 meters above ground, overlooking Kubelie Mosque and the nearby shops, its square floor plan measures 4.37 by 4.37 meters, with walls 0.85 meters thick. The foundation rests on a gently sloping rocky terrain. Its exact height is 23.3 meters.

The entrance to the tower is marked by a stone arch, though the metal door currently in place is a later addition and not part of the original design. The stone structure is illuminated and ventilated through small turret-like openings on three sides, with the eastern side remaining solid. Niches are integrated into the inner walls.

Halfway up, the four sides of the tower are reinforced with three metal braces and tensioning rods are installed to enhance the stability of the masonry. Near the top, the eastern side lacks openings, while the other three sides once featured large arched windows, now sealed.

The structure is built of stonemasonry with lime mortar and visible wooden bands in its interior. On the exterior, alternating rows of gray stones and carefully cut white limestone provide both a visual aesthetic and structural integrity. The corners are crafted with hewn stones and the outer walls are finished with a specialized “khorasan mortar” mixture which creates a 2 cm gap between the stones, effectively preventing rainwater from penetrating the structure.

=== Restorative interventions ===
Damage to the southeast corner, likely caused by the earthquake of December 17, 1926, was repaired during a restoration marked by the deliberate use of white stone, making the intervention distinct. Before 1848, three arched windows were sealed, one of which, on the side facing the bazaar, was later fitted with a sundial that remains intact today.

A significant change occurred in the late 1930s when the tower’s timekeeping mechanism was upgraded to include a clock face alongside its original chime-based system. This alteration modified the upper facade’s appearance.

In 2018, the clock tower underwent a major restoration led by experts from the Institute of Monuments of Culture and funded by the Turkish Cooperation and Coordination Agency (TIKA).
