= ABA Business Center =

Highrise building in Tirana, Albania

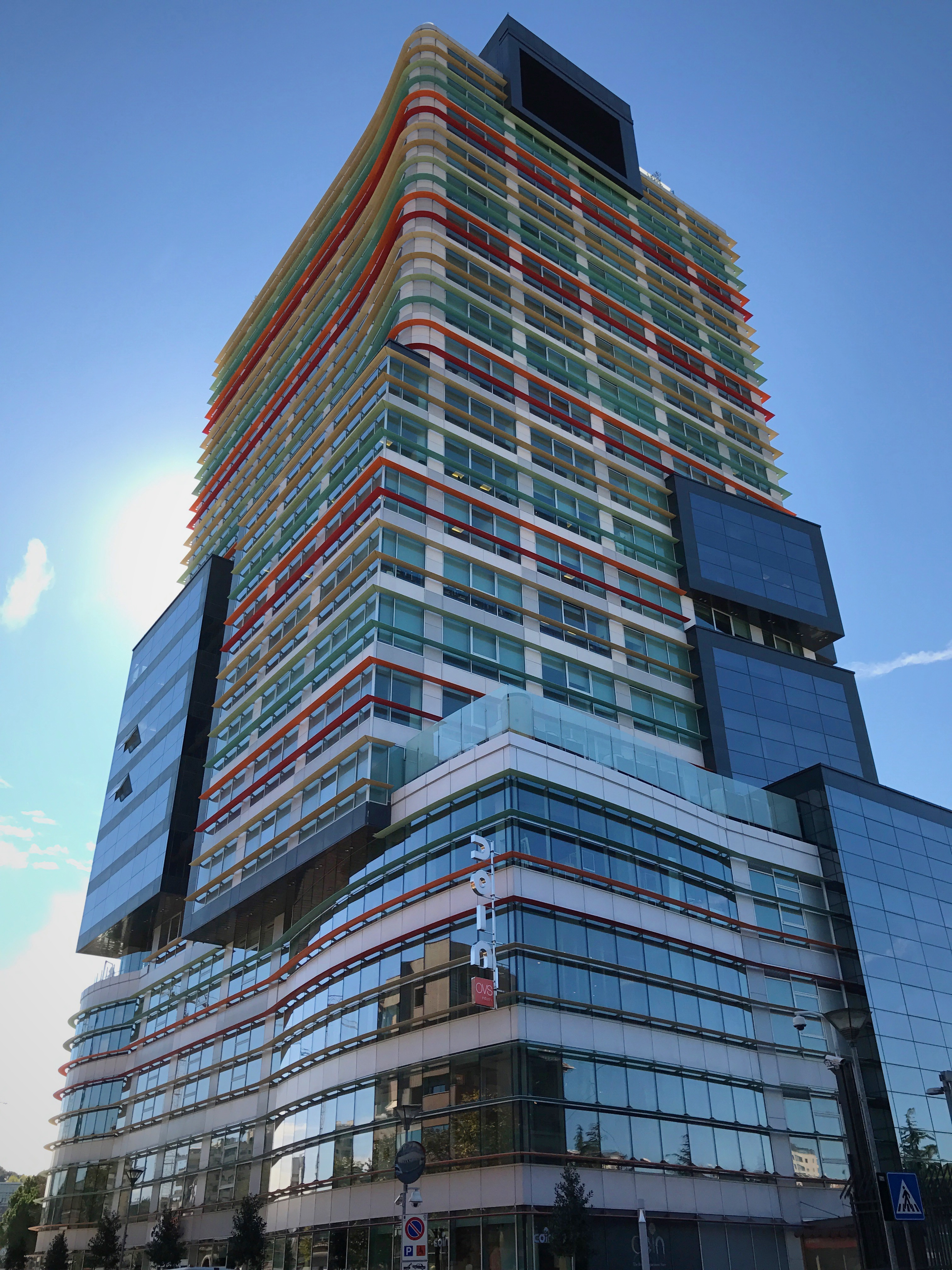
- Interactive map of the ABA Business Center area

General information
- Type: work and living
- Location: Rr. Papa Gjon Pali II 12, 1010 Tirana, Albania
- Coordinates: 41°19′12″N 19°49′22″E
- Construction started: 2009

Height
- Top floor: 83 m (272 ft)

Technical details
- Floor count: 21 (+3 underground)

Website
- ababusinesscenter.al

ABA Business Center is a mixed-use highrise building located in Tirana, Albania. Completed in 2009, the tower stands at 83 m (272 ft) tall and it consists of 21 floors above ground with 3 underground floors for parking space.

The center hosts a Coin department store.

== See also ==
- List of tallest buildings in Albania
