= Alban Tower =

Highrise building in Tirana, Albania

- Interactive map of the Alban Tower area

General information
- Status: Completed
- Type: Office building
- Location: Tirana, Albania, Rruga Ibrahim Rugova 1, Tirana 1001
- Coordinates: 41.32610°N 19.81652°E
- Construction started: 2005
- Completed: 2021; 13 May 2023 (inaugurated)
- Cost: EUR€ 25 Million

Height
- Roof: 107 m (351 ft)

Technical details
- Structural system: Concrete, steel
- Floor count: 25 (+6 underground)
- Floor area: 12,400 m^{2} (133,000 sq ft)
- Lifts/elevators: 7

Design and construction
- Architect: Archea Associati (Marco Casamonti)
- Structural engineer: AEI Progetti
- Main contractor: Al&Gi Sh.p.k

Website
- atti.al

Alban Tower is a mixed-use highrise building located in Tirana, Albania. The building was inaugurated on May 12, 2023, and stands at 107 meters (351 ft) tall, being divided into 25 floors.

== Architecture ==
=== Story of concept ===
The Alban Tower is part of a complex renovation programme of Tirana's historic centre which was designed and conceived between 1920 and 1935 by the Italian architects Armando Brasini and Gherardo Bosio. The tower's design was configured as a tridimensional geometric conjunction of four towers of different heights and colours, reflecting the city's fundamental design, which is centred on the tracing of the two traditional axes, a cardo and a decumanus, still visible in the urban planning of Tirana today.

The tower's produce was the result of an international competition in which some of the most important names in European architecture took part in the early 2000s. The competition was won by the Florentine studio Arches Associati who came up with the idea of going beyond the American conception of the skyscraper according to Louis Sullivan’s definition to propose a profile inspired by the middle-age Italian towers, as in the examples of the Arnolfo Palazzo della Signoria from Florence and Torre Velasca from Milano.

A single trunk of a tree which branches spread into four pieces extending upwards was the model for the Alban Tower. Due to these different schemes, the façades of the buildings have a complex effect and display a striking aesthetic. The building's base comprises panels made of green concrete equipped with Murano glass stones in five different shades, giving the surface an iridescent effect.

To the upper floors, the panels take on thirteen different colors, being assembled to distinguish the four different sections of the tower. The panels are made of light aluminum, bent to create the curves of the tower.

== See also ==
- List of tallest buildings in Albania
- Landmarks in Tirana
