= Valentina Pistoli =

Albanian architect (1928-1993)

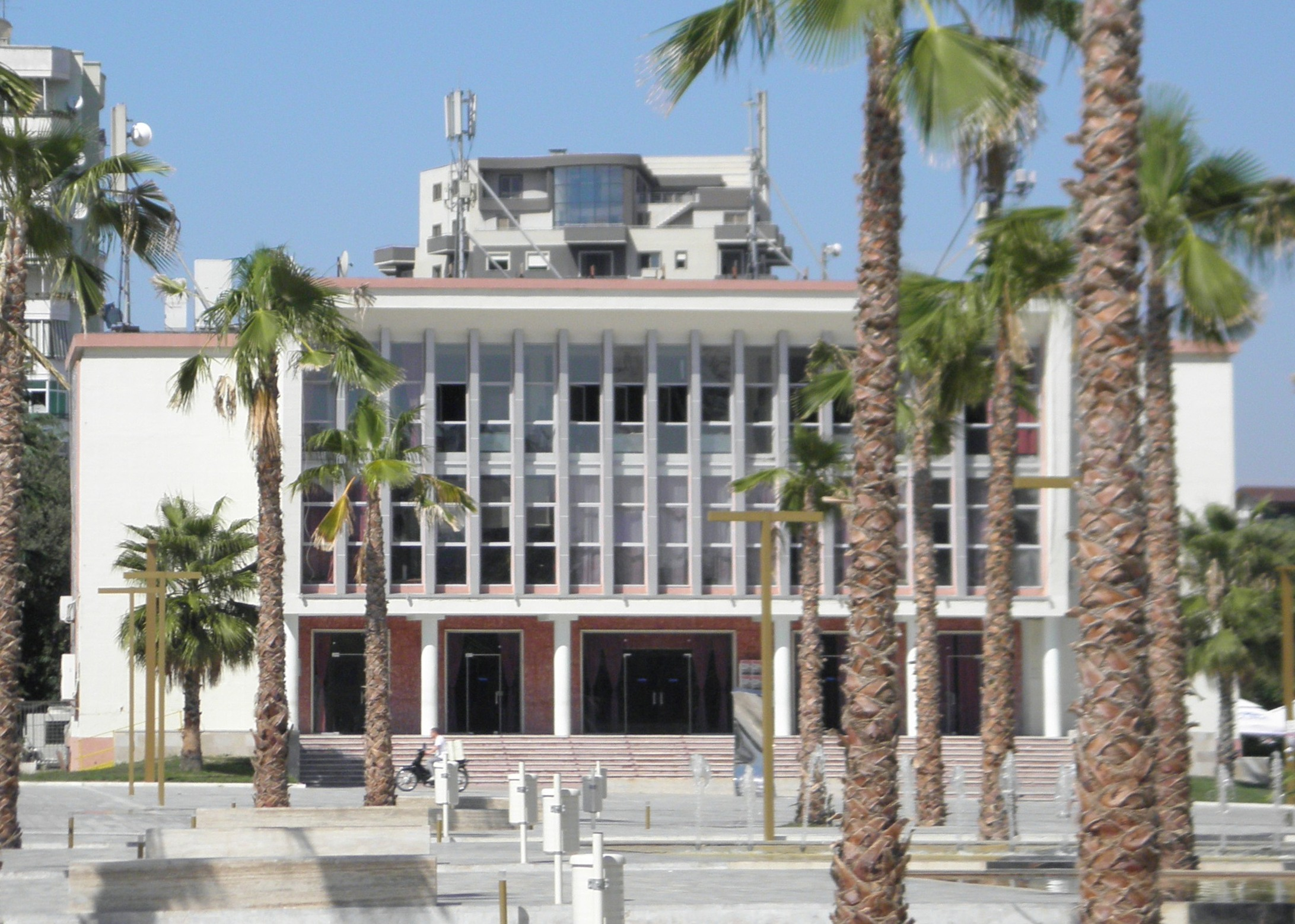
- Candid of Valentina Pistoli
- Born: 1928; Korçë, Albania
- Died: 1993 (aged 64–65); National Martyrs Cemetery of Albania
- Occupation: Architect
- Awards: Albanian Architecture Award 2018 (accepted by her son, Tani Pistoli)
- Projects: Tirana International Hotel

Valentina Pistoli (1928–1993) was the first Albanian woman architect. She was a member of the Communist Party in Albania, and was born in Korçë. She studied architecture at Sofia University and graduated in 1952.

Pistoli led the group of architects that designed the 15-story Hotel Tirana. In addition to her most notable design Hotel Tirana, she designed several residential complexes

She also worked part-time as a Lecturer in Architecture at the Faculty of Engineering in the Polytechnic University of Tirana.

== Accomplishments ==
Pistoli's hotel is hailed as one of the biggest buildings during communist times. The building was designed by Pistoli and constructed with the help of the Albanian Government. Before the construction of the hotel, she worked on smaller projects such as residential housing, community areas, theaters, and buildings intended for use of education. Her designs challenged the communist ideals of her peers, but nonetheless were built to last for years afterwards.

Pistoli's successful designs for the hotel and her residential complexes, saw her receive a 2018 Albanian Architecture Award, honorably accepted by her son, Tani Pistoli. The award was for being one of the first women to become an architect at the time and her design accomplishments that transcended the rules and regulations of the communist agenda at the time.

== Albanian Gender Equality ==
When it came to Albania and their female designers, there was a running pattern of discrimination due to gender equality in the predominantly male occupation of architecture and design. Women had to work twice as hard as their male counterparts while also dealing with the restrictions of political norms and idealizations of the time. For Valentina Pistoli to become an architect at this time was proof of major changes to come to the world of architecture. Many women followed after her footsteps and drew inspiration from her teachings, providing a head start to many Albanian female architects, who continue to work hard and earn their credibility by taking examples from Pistoli's leadership.

Pistol distinguished herself from other designers. Because of her new way of thinking of architecture based on logic and freedom, even though certain material and aesthetic limits dictated from the regime of the communist party at the time. This did not sway Pistoli in any way, and inspired her to continue to design and draft her creations to create an open perspective at a time where everything was completely uniform and undeviating from the bare minimum of what was needed to sustain people.
