= The Englishman's Tower =

- Sahati i Inglizit
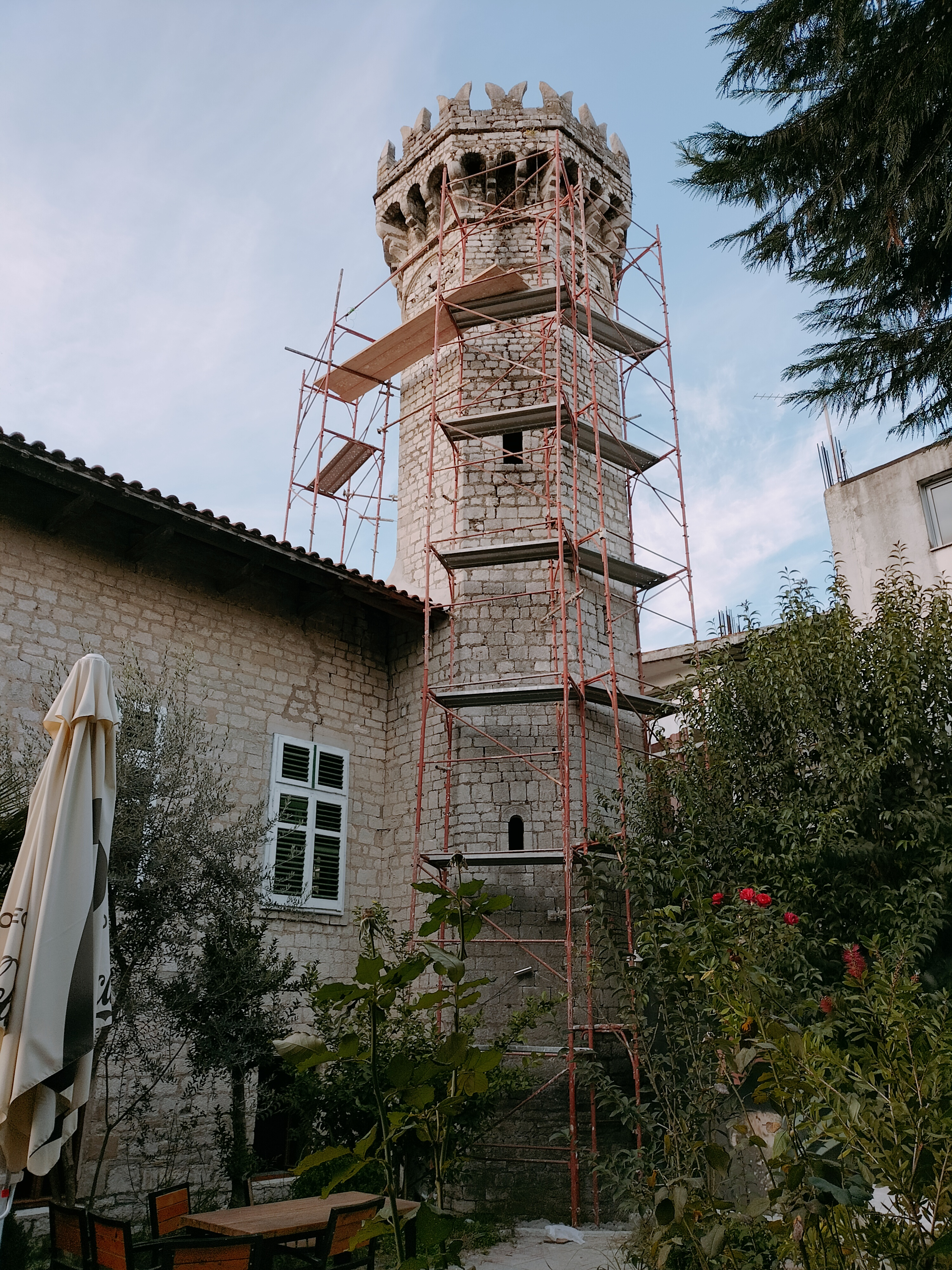
- A view of the tower under restoration
- 42.06807°N 19.51305°E
- Type: Clock tower
- Location: Rruga "Teuta", Shkodër, Albania

History
- Founder: Lord Alfred Paget
- Built: 19th century

Site notes
- Height: 16.35 m (53.6 ft)
- Architectural style: English Architecture
- Restored: 2024
- Owner: Municipality of Shkodër

Cultural Monument of Albania
- Type: Cultural
- Criteria: Cat. I
- Designated: 15 January 1963; 10 June 1973

The Englishman's Tower (Albanian: Sahati i Inglizit) is a clock tower from Ottoman times located in Shkodër, Albania. It was first recognized as a cultural heritage site by the rectorate of the State University of Tirana under decision no. 6 on January 15, 1963 and subsequently by the Ministry of Education and Culture via reference no. 1886 on June 10, 1973.

== History ==
Built in the late 19th century with funds from English nobleman Lord Alfred Paget, the Englishman’s Tower, or Sahati i Inglizit in Albanian, is the only building structure in Shkodër resembling a medieval-style castle or château. Lord Paget, who arrived in the city during the last quarter of the 19th century, is believed to have undertaken a dual mission: as a “villegiatore” (holiday resident) and as a political-religious agent, promoting the spread of Protestantism in Albania, with Shkodër as his base.

In his residence, Lord Paget designed an oriental-style large hall with a carved ceiling, dining room and other sections. He adapted this space into a chapel-like shrine inspired by Protestant churches, with the clock tower functioning as a bell tower for religious services. Paget's ultimate goal was to establish an Anglican church in the city.

His efforts faced strong opposition and the number of his followers dwindled, as local Catholic clergy, supported by the Austrian consul, mounted protests against his religious mission. These objections prompted Ottoman authorities to intervene, halting his activities. Consequently, Paget’s residence remained simply a private home.

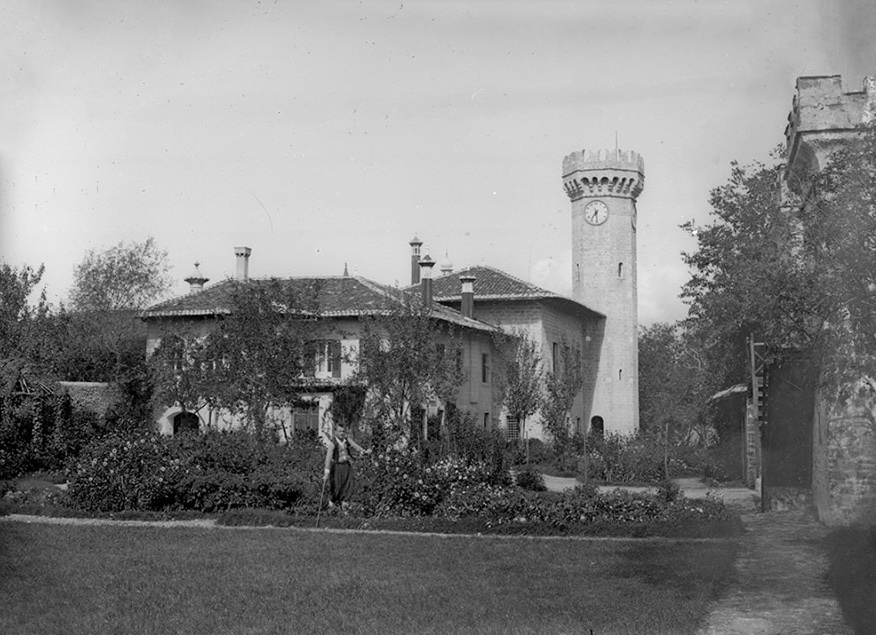
Photograph of the Englishman's Tower by Pietro Marubi (1875)

The tower, however, found an alternative purpose as a fire observation point due to its panoramic views of the city. After the failure of his religious mission, Paget installed a large clock with three distinct dials in place of the intended bell, ensuring the time could be seen and heard across the city. The clock’s loud chimes became a prominent feature in Shkodër's daily life, though by the end of the Ottoman era, the clock often fell out of synchronization due to improper maintenance.

In 1949, the building was turned into a museum, known as the People’s Museum. Its outer structure still bore traces of the original clock. During communist rule, the clocks were removed and transferred to the Fortress of Gjirokastër. After 1990, the tower and residence were returned to their original owners.

According to Hakki Acun, based on its architectural style and similarities with structures from the Abdul Hamid II period, the tower is likely to have been constructed either at the end of the 19th century or the beginning of the 20th century.

== Architecture ==
The Englishman’s Tower is notable for its unique construction and can be classified as a type IV clock tower, corresponding to several construction periods. (Note: A type IV clock tower encompasses towers designed by incorporating unique architectural solutions, constructed across four different time periods.) Unlike most clock towers in Albania, it features an octagonal layout. Its exact height is 16.35 meters, with the walls made of stonemasonry, being 0.55 to 0.6 meters thick.

The lower section consists of smaller, semi-hewn stones arranged up to 1.5 meters above ground. The upper section displays larger, finely sculpted stones neatly set in rows.

This variation suggests that the work may have been carried out by different craftsmen or perhaps it reflected Paget's aesthetic preferences for the upper portions of the building.

The entrance to the tower is through a stone-arched gate facing southwest, with additional access from the residence’s first and second floors. The tower’s exterior features windows framed by stone arches and three spaces for the clock dials. Above the clock section, an octagonal frame constructed from profiled stone extends outward, supported by stone corbels. This section is crowned with a stone balustrade, resembling bars.

Inside the tower, access to the top is through stone steps that cantilever out from the inner walls. Five platforms are built within: three are wooden and two are concrete. The interior is plastered and despite its utilitarian purpose, it displays refined craftsmanship.

The Englishman’s Tower remains a striking piece of architecture, blending functionality with aesthetic ambition and stands as a testament to Shkodër’s cultural and historical past.
