= Rogner Hotel Tirana =

Hotel in Tirana, Albania

Rogner Europapark

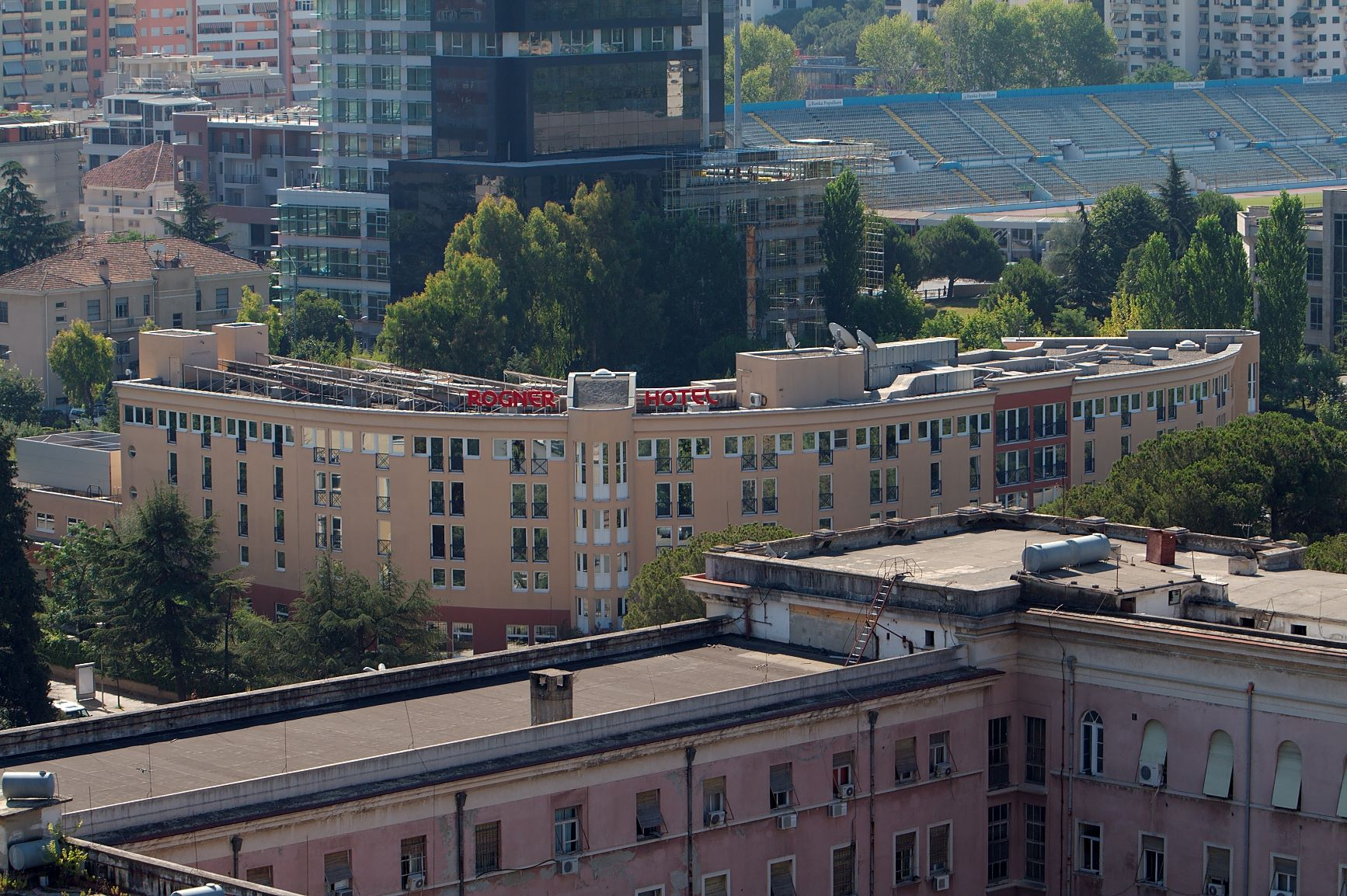
- Rogner Hotel Tirana in the Distance below

- Location in Albania

General information
- Location: Tirana, Albania, Bulevardi Deshmoret e Kombit 9, 1010 Tirana, Albania
- Coordinates: 41°19′14″N 19°49′14″E
- Opening: 1995

Technical details
- Floor count: 4

Other information
- Number of rooms: 136

Website
- Official Website

Rogner Hotel Tirana (also known as Rogner Europapark) is a luxury hotel located on the Dëshmorët e Kombit Boulevard, south of the main center of Tirana, Albania. It was built in 1995 by Robert Rogner, an Austrian builder.

Located near the Presidential Palace and some foreign embassies, it is a notable location for conferences and media-related events. The hotel, with its distinctive crescent shape, has 136 rooms and is set in Mediterranean-style gardens.
