= Dibër Street =

Street in Tirana, Albania

Coordinates: 41°19′46″N 19°49′10″E

- Location: Tirana, Albania
- Southwest end: Skanderbeg Square
- Northeast end: Mother Teresa Hospital (QSUT)

Dibër Street (Albanian: Rruga e Dibrës, formerly Rruga Bajram Curri) is a major street in Tirana, Albania. It runs northeast from the central Skanderbeg Square, just south of the Tirana International Hotel. The Mother Teresa Hospital (QSUT) is located on this street.
