= Bolles+Wilson =

Architecture firm based in Germany

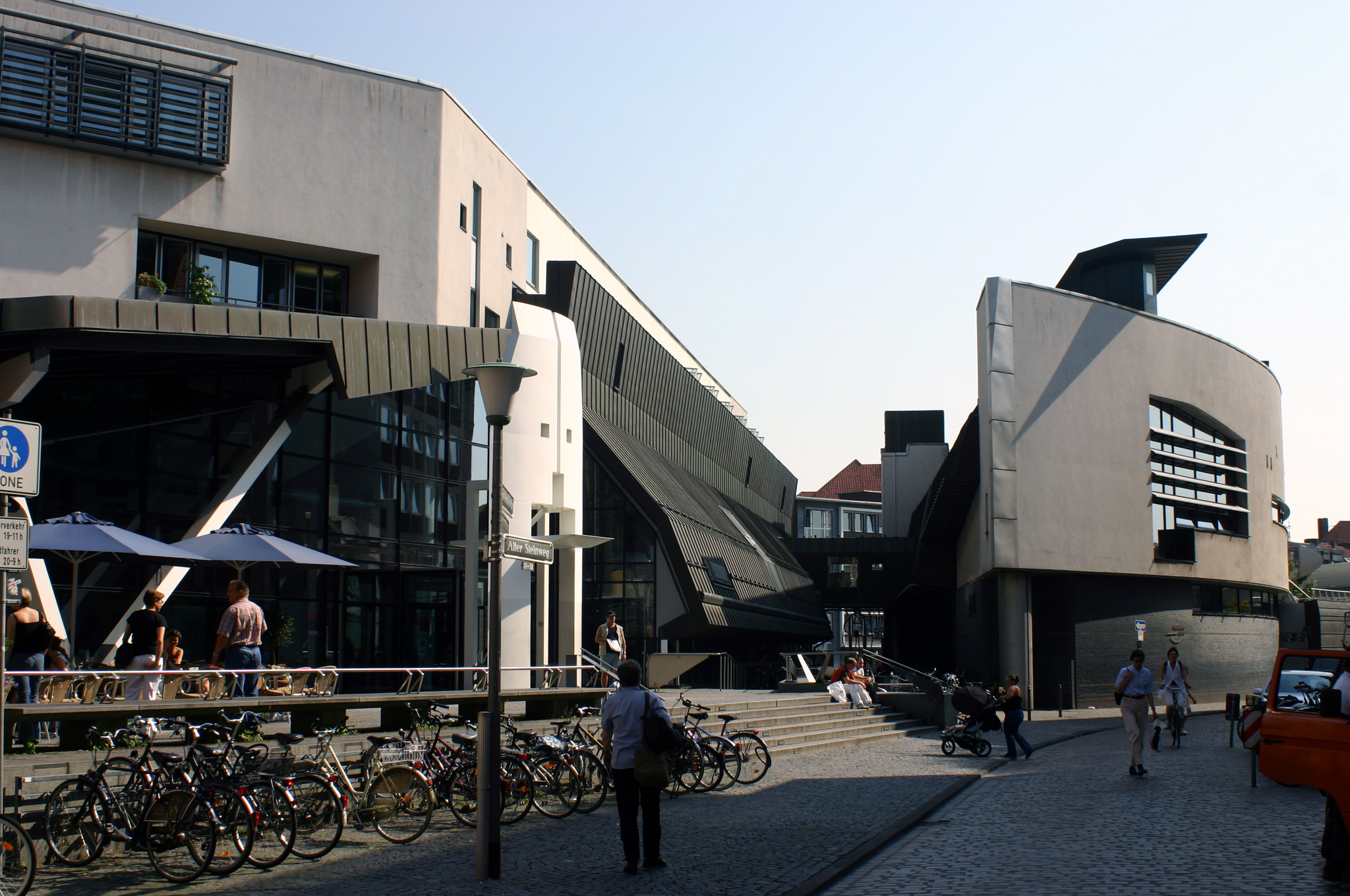
Münster City Library (1987-1993)

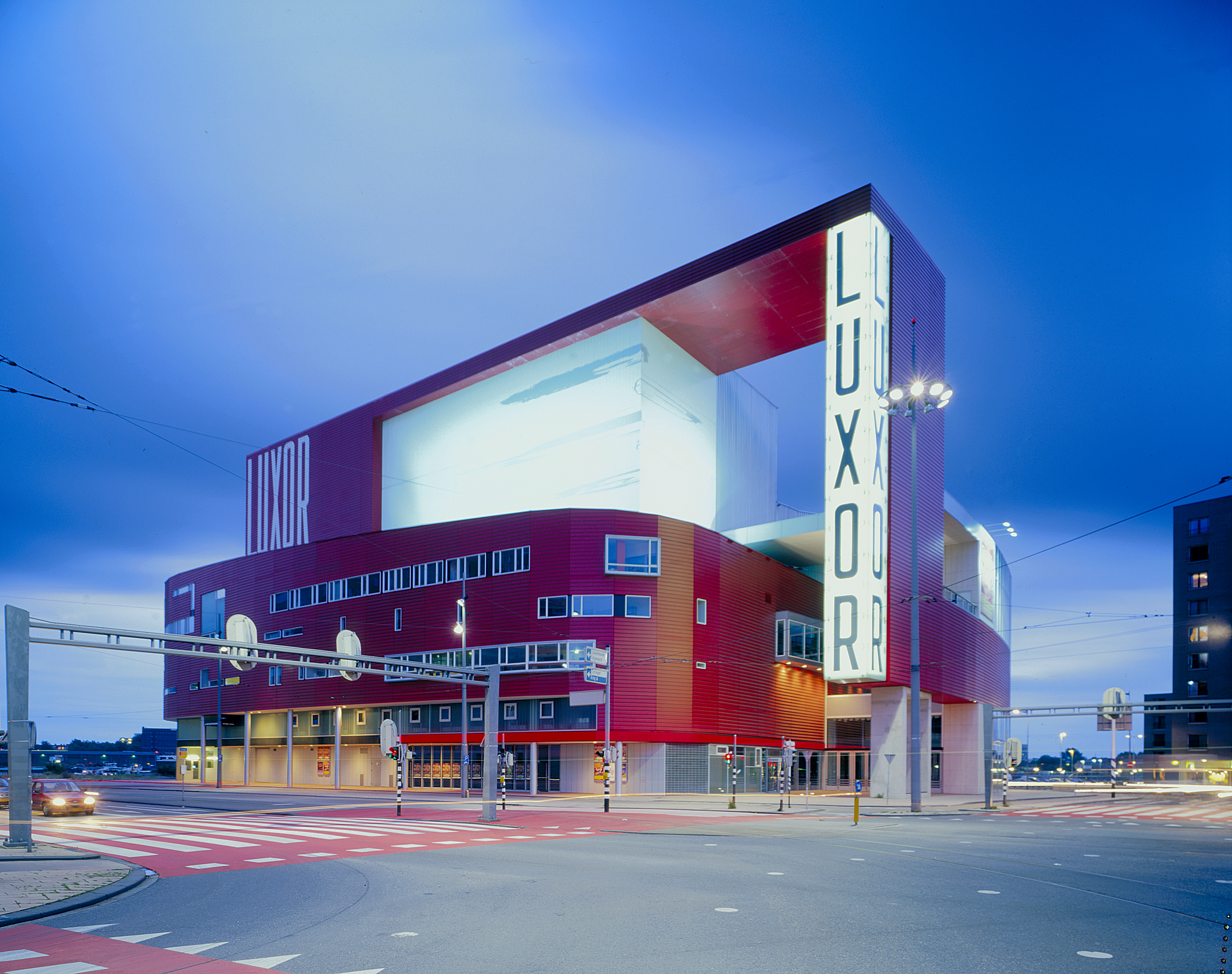
Luxor Theatre, Rotterdam (1996-2001)

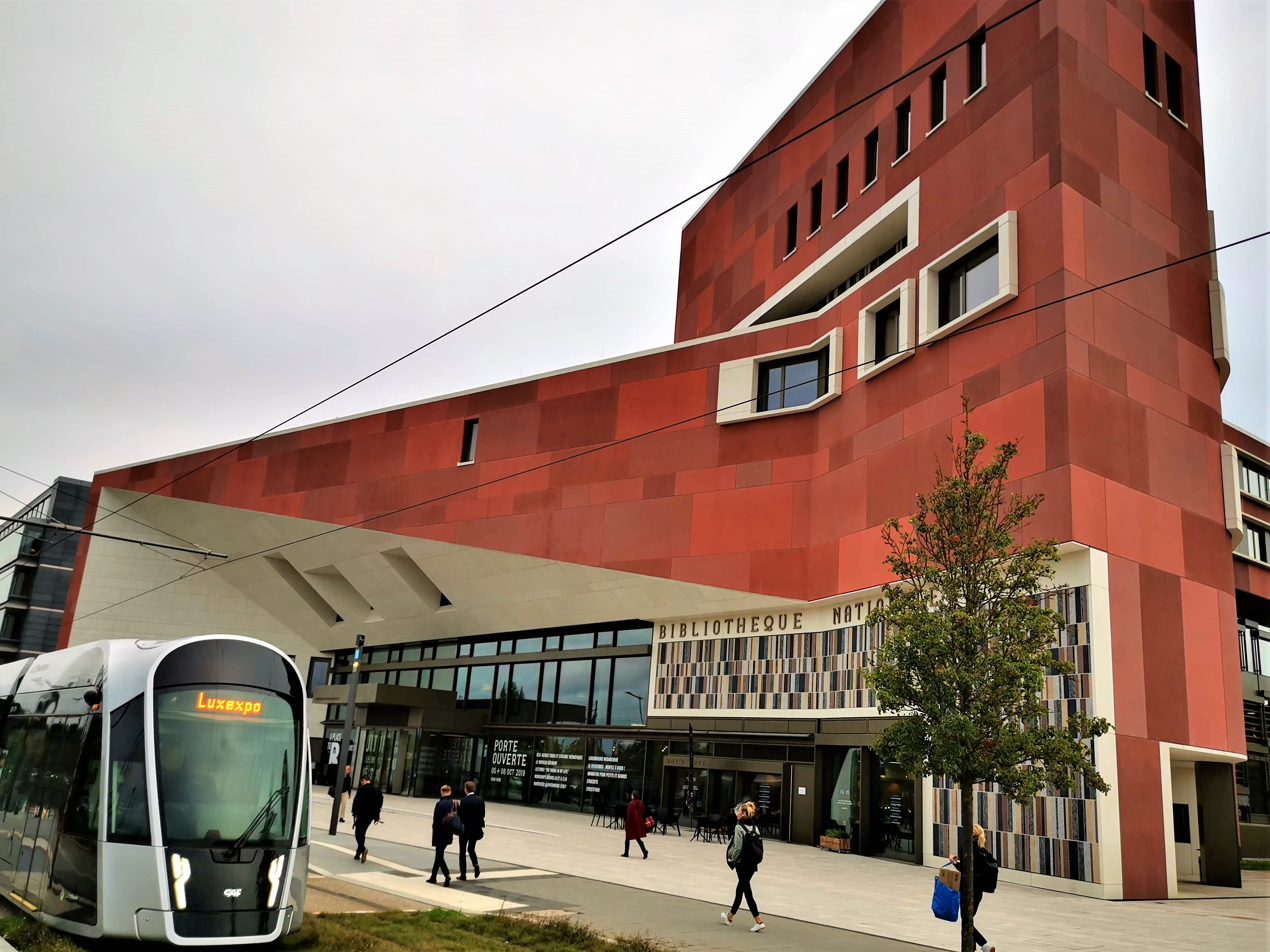
National Library of Luxembourg (2014-2019)

Bolles+Wilson is an architecture firm established by Julia Bolles-Wilson and Peter Wilson, both Architectural Association (AA) graduates. Established in London, the firm moved to Münster after winning the design competition for the Münster City Library. Other major works include the Luxor Theatre in Rotterdam (2001) and the Helmond City Library (2010).

== Biography ==
Julia B. Bolles-Willson was born in 1948 in Münster and graduated at the Karlsruhe Institute of Technology in 1976. Since 1996 she has been professor for architectural design at the Fachhochschule Münster.

Peter L. Wilson was born in 1950 in Melbourne and studied at the University of Melbourne from 1969 to 1971 prior to moving to the AA where he graduated in 1974. In 2013 he was awarded the Australian Institute of Architects Gold Medal.
