= Eyes of Tirana =

Skyscraper in Tirana, Albania

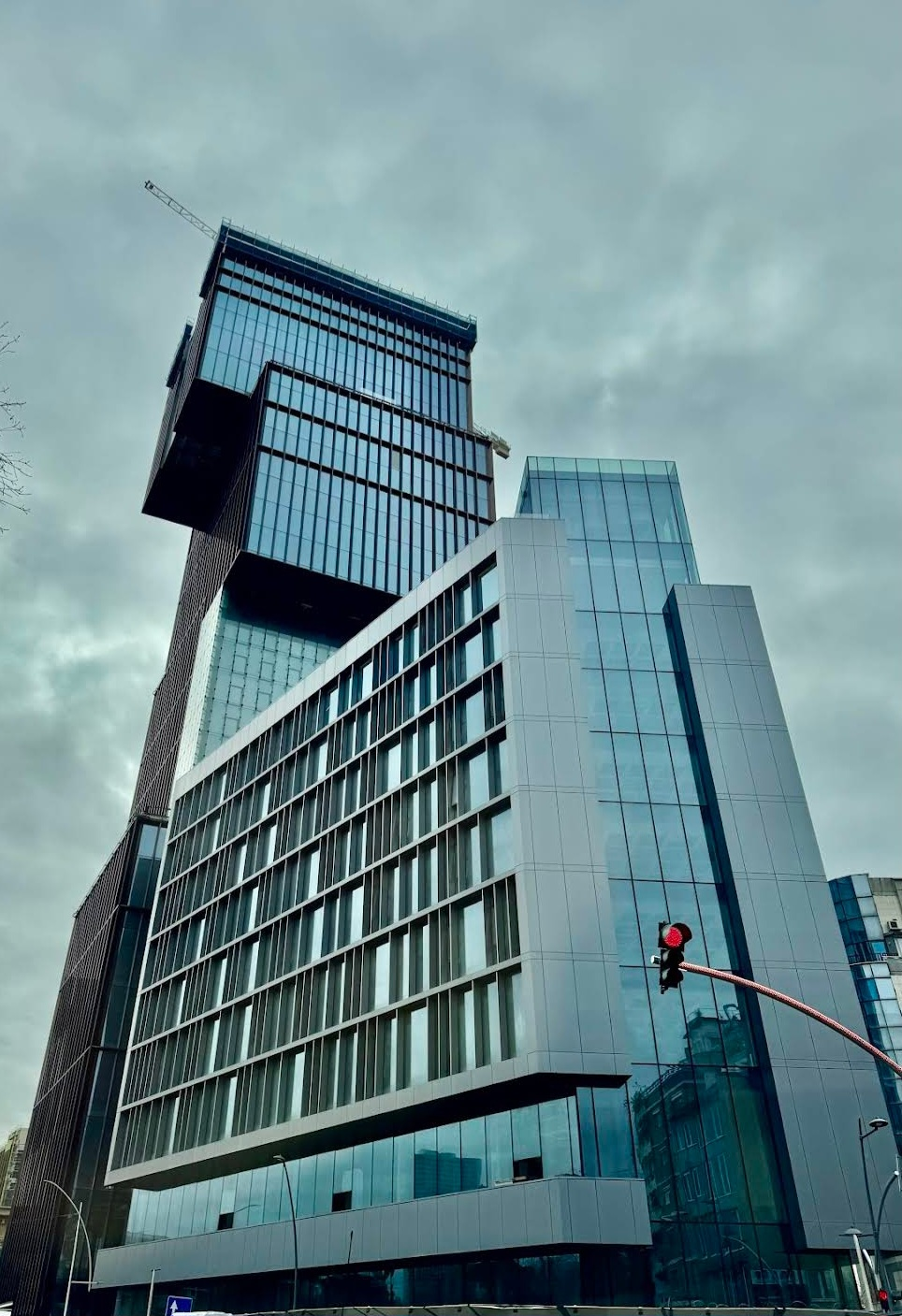
- The building in 2026

General information
- Status: Under construction
- Type: Mixed-use, Residential, Office
- Location: Tirana, Albania, Kavaja Street
- Coordinates: 41.32851°N 19.81559°E
- Construction started: 2017
- Topped-out: 2023
- Completed: 2025

Height
- Roof: 135 m (443 ft)

Technical details
- Structural system: Concrete
- Floor count: 31
- Floor area: 63,500 m^{2} (684,000 sq ft)

Design and construction
- Architect: Henning Larsen
- Main contractor: Ideal Construction

Eyes of Tirana is a mixed-use skyscraper under construction in Tirana, Albania. Designed by Henning Larsen, the tower was topped out in 2023 and stands at 135 meters (443 ft) tall, being divided into 31 floors and a ten-storey low-rise building.

Upon its completion, the tower is set to contain the functions of a hotel, serviced apartments and offices.

== Architecture ==
=== Concept ===
The main tower of the complex has a special architectural volumetry. It divides the entire structure into four parallelepipeds of seven floors each, imitating irregular standing playing cubes. Both of the main buildings display double-skin facades with aluminium cladding, fully glazed with external sunshade elements. The aim of the architects was to shell the building with 2,537 structural cell facades with the integration of vertical and horizontal pilasters sect. 80×300 mm covered in composite panel with prismatic finish.

Main designers Henning Larsen have had the task of creating a specific engineering with curtain walls and spiderglass tensile structures for the tower. They conceptualized the project of the cladding facades of the entire “Eyes of Tirana” tower in the central square of the city. These are the facades in modular cells specifically designed for the tower, and the two structural blocks of the top floors composed of two large tensile structures in spiderglass facades and horizontal floors of structural glass with transparency towards the lower void.

== See also ==
- List of tallest buildings in Albania
- Landmarks in Tirana
