= Kavaja Street =

Street in Tirana, Albania

Coordinates: 41°19′41″N 19°48′52″E

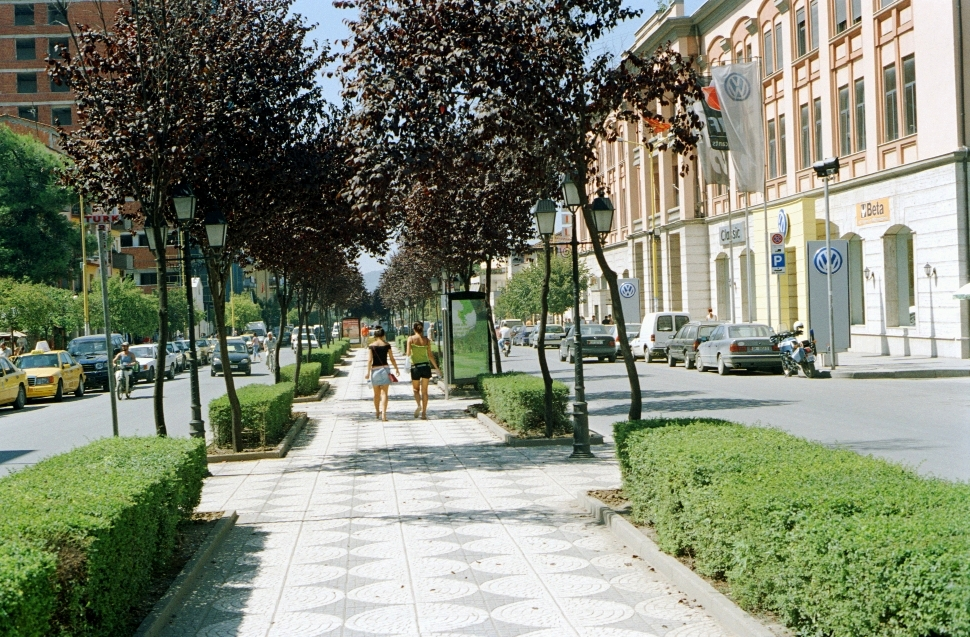
- View of the Kavajë Street
- From: Skanderbeg Square
- To: 21 Dhjetori

Kavajë Street (Albanian: Rruga e Kavajës) is a major street of Tirana, Albania. It is the most important street of western Tirana and runs west from the central Skanderbeg Square for several kilometres and continues further west to the Adriatic Sea. It is known for its prime real estate and some of the most expensive residential apartments in Tirana. The Universal Hospital Tirana is located along this street. It intersects with Bajram Curri Boulevard.
