= InterContinental Hotel Tirana =

Hotel in Tirana, Albania

- Interactive map of the InterContinental Hotel Tirana area

General information
- Status: Under construction
- Type: Hotel
- Location: Tirana, Albania, Skanderbeg Square 8, 1001 Tirana, Albania
- Coordinates: 41.33009°N 19.81832°E
- Construction started: January 2021
- Completed: 2025 (scheduled)
- Owner: IHG Hotels & Resorts

Height
- Antenna spire: 155.3 m (510 ft)
- Roof: 135 m (443 ft)

Technical details
- Structural system: Concrete, Steel
- Floor count: 33
- Floor area: 36,500 m^{2} (393,000 sq ft)

Design and construction
- Architects: Peter Wilson; Atelier 4
- Structural engineer: AEI Progetti srl
- Main contractor: GECI L.T.D.

Other information
- Number of rooms: 300

InterContinental Hotel Tirana is a hotel located in Tirana, Albania on the corner between central Skanderbeg Square and Zogu I Boulevard. The tower shares the same hotelier complex with lower-rising Tirana International Hotel as an extension. Topped in 2023 and expected for opening in the first quarter of 2025, the hotel stands at 135 metres (443 ft) tall and is divided into 33 floors.

== Architecture ==
=== Concept ===
The construction's owner is the IHG Hotels & Resorts Group and is located in Tirana's central Skanderbeg Square, behind the historic Tirana International Hotel building, also owned by the Geci Group. The tower was designed for hotel use and planned for a height of 135 meters in its above-ground part, consisting of a podium occupying the first three levels, accommodating the lobby, a technical floor serving the restaurants, a SPA level and a casino level, two floors dedicated to offices, twenty floors for the hotel, three floors for hotel flats, two levels for the panoramic restaurant, and a technical floor at the top of the terrace.

=== Specifications ===
The hotel will have a total of 300 rooms and suites, a large conference centre with a ballroom and a capacity of up to 1,000 people for MICE (Meetings, Incentives, Conferences & Exhibitions) events and weddings. There will also be a luxury spa, and a rooftop restaurant and bar with panoramic views of the city.

The four basement floors contain the technical rooms (on the deepest level), two floors of parking spaces and, on level -1, the technical rooms serving the hotel. Next to the tower, the conference rooms also include a large hall with more than a thousand seats. The structures of the tower are all made of reinforced concrete while the ‘light’ structures of the conference rooms are mainly made of steel.

Characterized by simple geometric shapes, particularly two cuboids with distinct colors and materials, the tower features a contrast between gold and black.

The closest key-points to the tower are the National Historical Museum, the Castle of Tirana, the National Opera House, the National Art Gallery and the main institutions like the Albanian Parliament, Ministries, the National Bank of Albania, and Tirana Municipality.

== See also ==
- List of tallest buildings in Albania
- Landmarks in Tirana
