= Ambasador III =

Highrise building in Tirana, Albania

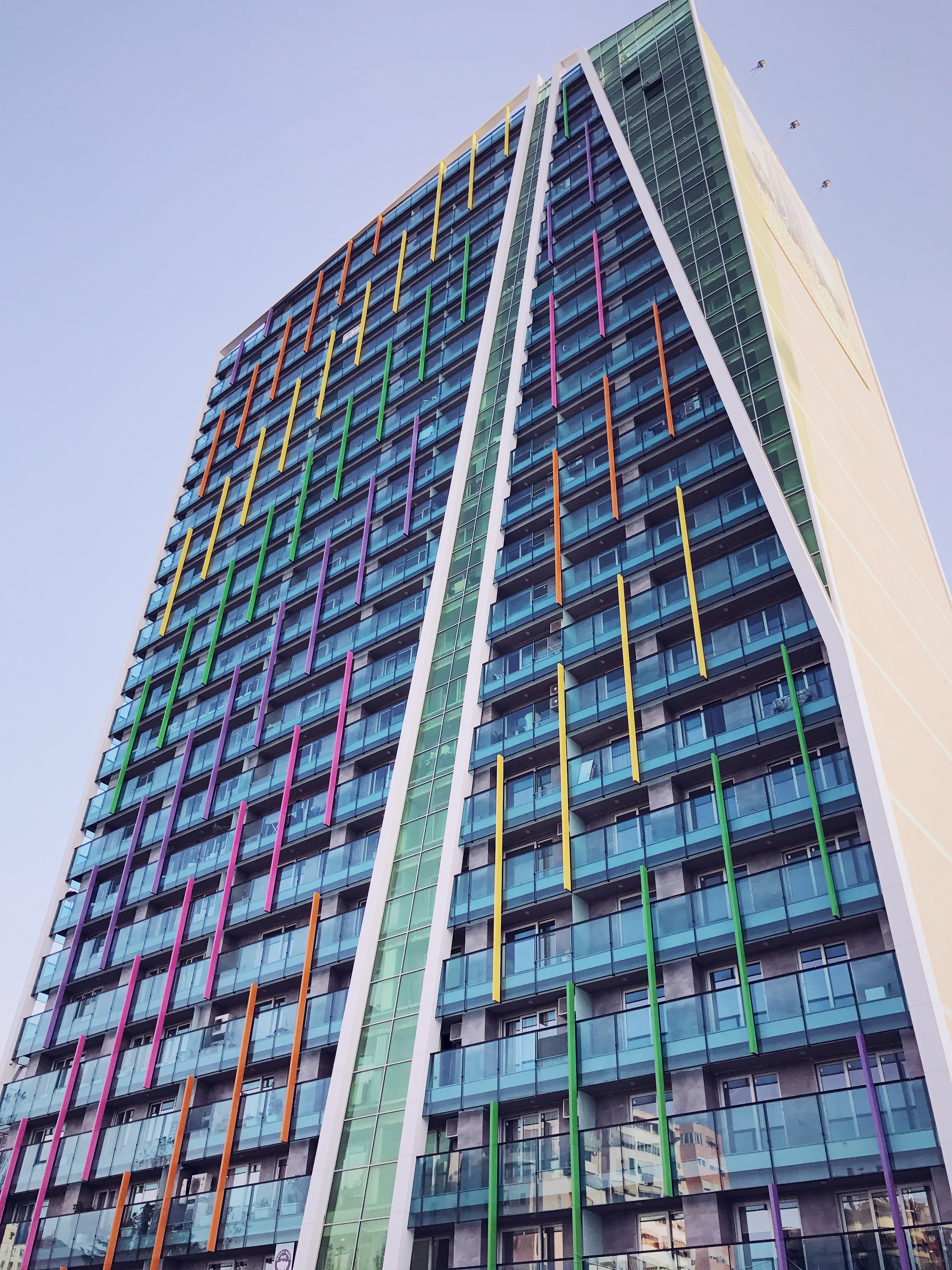
- Interactive map of the Ambasador III area

General information
- Status: Completed
- Type: Residential, Retail
- Location: Tirana, Albania, Rruga Dervish Hima 3, Tirana, Albania
- Coordinates: 41.31834°N 19.82585°E
- Construction started: 2010
- Completed: 2014

Height
- Roof: 82 m (269 ft)

Technical details
- Structural system: Reinforced concrete
- Floor count: 23 (+4 underground)
- Floor area: 32,000 m^{2} (344,000 sq ft)

Design and construction
- Architect: Atelier 4
- Main contractor: Mane TCI

Ambasador III is a mixed-use highrise building located in Tirana, Albania, in close proximity of Air Albania Stadium. Completed in 2016, the building stands at 82 meters (269 ft) tall and is divided into 23 floors, containing a mix of residential, retail and commercial functions. The building shared she same plot with the Tirana Vertical Forest building which is still under construction.

== Architecture ==
=== Concept ===
Designed by Atelier 4, the building's architecture stems from modernism and employs a design that makes use of elements and materials extending from the lowest point to the tallest part. It is an esthetic contrast between reinforced concrete in juxtaposition with structural glass, which highlights its height and eco-friendly durable structure as well as transparency.

== See also ==
- List of tallest buildings in Albania
- Landmarks in Tirana
