= Tirana International Hotel =

Hotel in Tirana, Albania

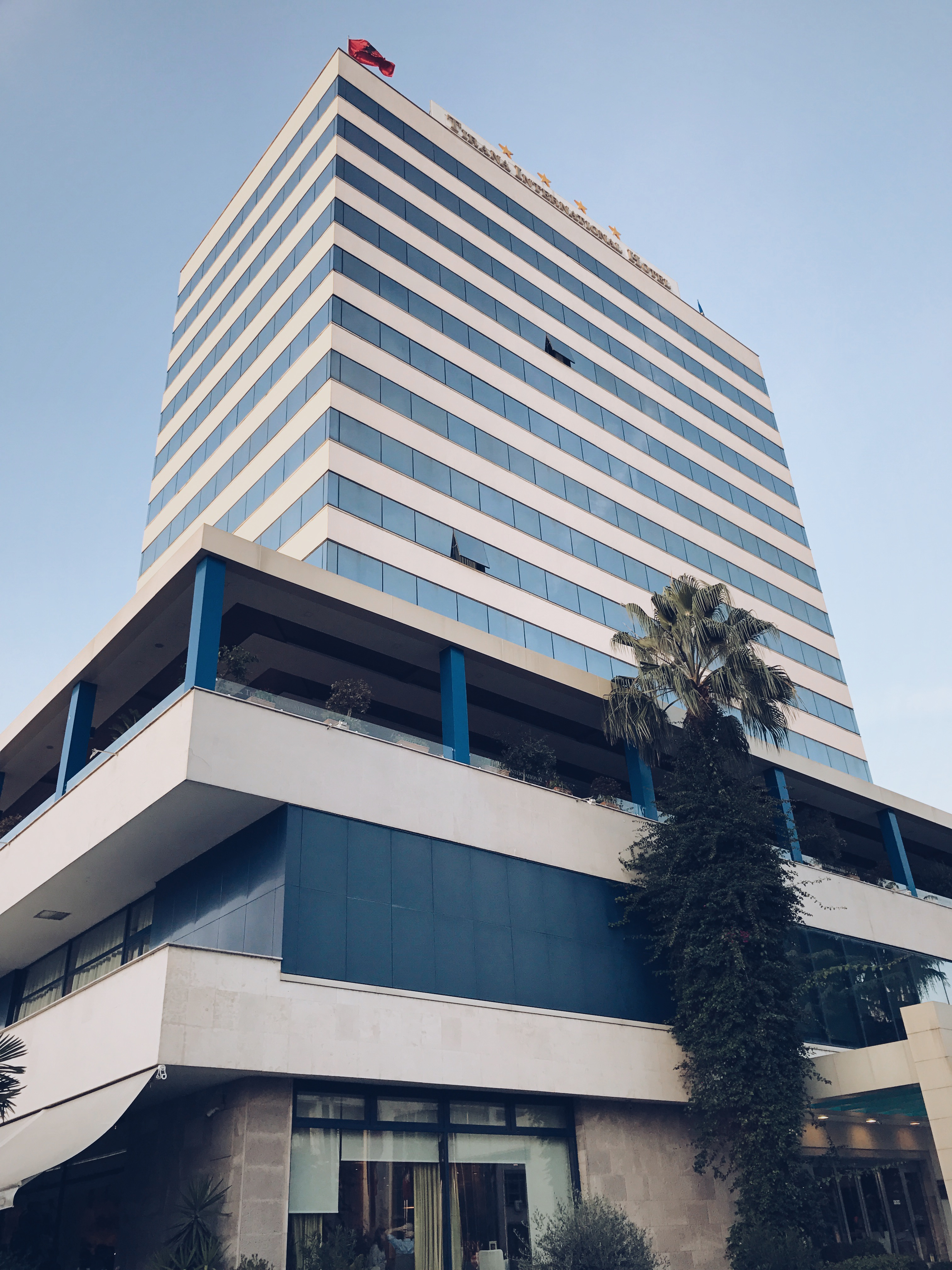
- Tirana International Hotel
- Interactive map of the Tirana International Hotel area

General information
- Status: Completed
- Type: Hotel
- Location: Tirana, Albania, Skanderbeg Square 8, 1001 Tirana, Albania
- Coordinates: 41.32972°N 19.81861°E
- Completed: 1979
- Owner: Geci sh.p.k

Height
- Roof: 56 m (184 ft)

Technical details
- Structural system: Concrete, Steel
- Floor count: 15

Design and construction
- Architect: Valentina Pistoli

Other information
- Number of rooms: 168

Website
- tiranainternational.com

Tirana International Hotel, locally known as Pesëmbëdhjetëkatëshi (“The Fifteen-Story Building”), is a prominent landmark in Tirana, Albania. Built in 1979 in a Soviet-era architectural style, and on the site of the Orthodox cathedral, it was originally named Hotel Tirana.

In 2001, the hotel underwent major renovation works by an Italian company, transforming it into a 4-star hotel, featuring 168 rooms across 15 floors.

The hotel is part of a larger hospitality complex that includes the highrise InterContinental Hotel Tirana.

== History ==
Tirana International Hotel & Conference Centre is a 15-story building constructed in the late 1970s. Situated in the heart of Tirana, on the intersection of Zogu I Boulevard and Dibër Street, it is surrounded by two other prominent landmarks, the National History Museum and the Palace of Culture.

During communist rule, when the city was predominantly made up of low-rise buildings, the hotel stood out as an imposing structure visible from afar. For many years, it held the distinction of being the tallest building in Albania.

Designed by architect Valentina Pistoli, the hotel was built using prefabricated reinforced concrete panels with ice-white marble in its facade, reflecting the architectural style of the period.

By the 1980s, it had become a key meeting place for influential figures, including members of the Politburo. For this reason, secret underground escape tunnels were incorporated into the building’s design. These were not intended for fire emergencies but served as contingency exits for high-ranking officials in the event of physical threats, underscoring the heightened security concerns of the communist regime.

== See also ==
- List of tallest buildings in Albania
