= Maritim Hotel Plaza Tirana =

Hotel in Tirana, Albania

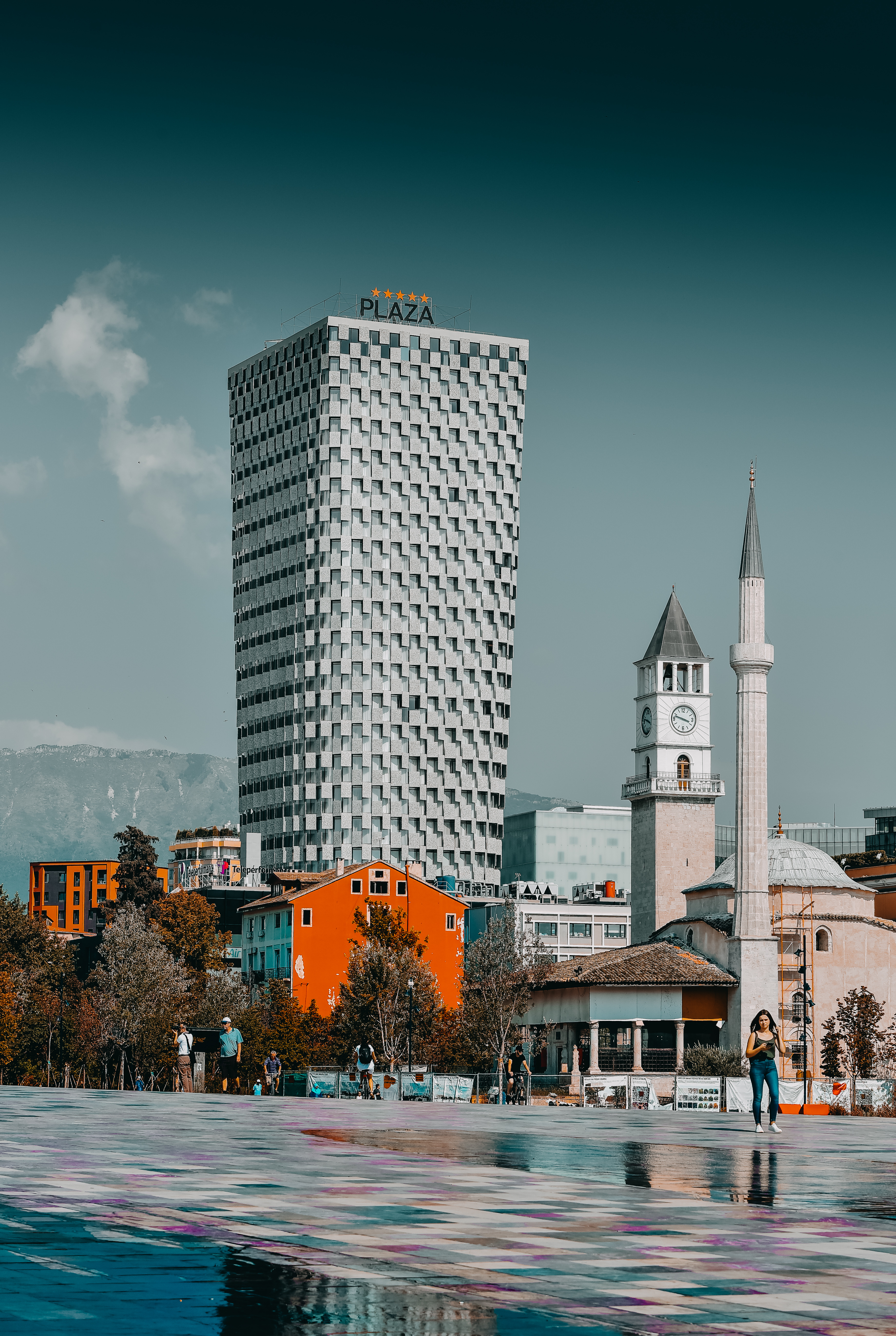

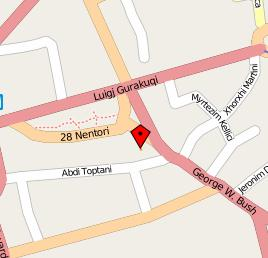
- Maritim Plaza Hotel Location

General information
- Type: work and living
- Location: Rruga 28 Nëntori 18, 1001 Tirana, Albania
- Coordinates: 41.32778°N 19.82154°E
- Construction started: 2009
- Completed: 2015

Height
- Top floor: 85 m (278.9 ft)

Technical details
- Floor count: 24 (plus 4 for parking garage below)
- Lifts/elevators: 4

Website
- www.plazatirana.com

Maritim Hotel Plaza Tirana is a luxury hotel in Tirana, Albania owned by German Maritim hotel chain. It is located on 28 Nëntori Street, near the Skanderbeg Square.

The hotel building is also known as the TID Tower, after the Tirana International Development corporation that originally commissioned its construction. The design comes from Belgian architectural firm 51N4E, and construction started on 14 January 2007. "The building is designed as a constellation of 3 singular buildings: the tower of 85 m height coming down to the ground, a 5 story glass building with a cantilevering roof that creates a public open air galleria; and a concrete building with a hollowed out quarter dome, embracing the tomb of Suleiman Pasha [sic; actually the Kapllan Pasha Tomb]." The central tower stands at 85 metres (279 ft) tall, and consists of 24 floors. The TID Tower's architectural design is notable for its sensitive incorporation of the Kapllan Pasha Tomb, tucked in a void in one of the complex’s low-slung concrete buildings, and for its use of concrete panels cast on-site. The building design was featured in the 15th Venice Architecture Biennale in 2016.

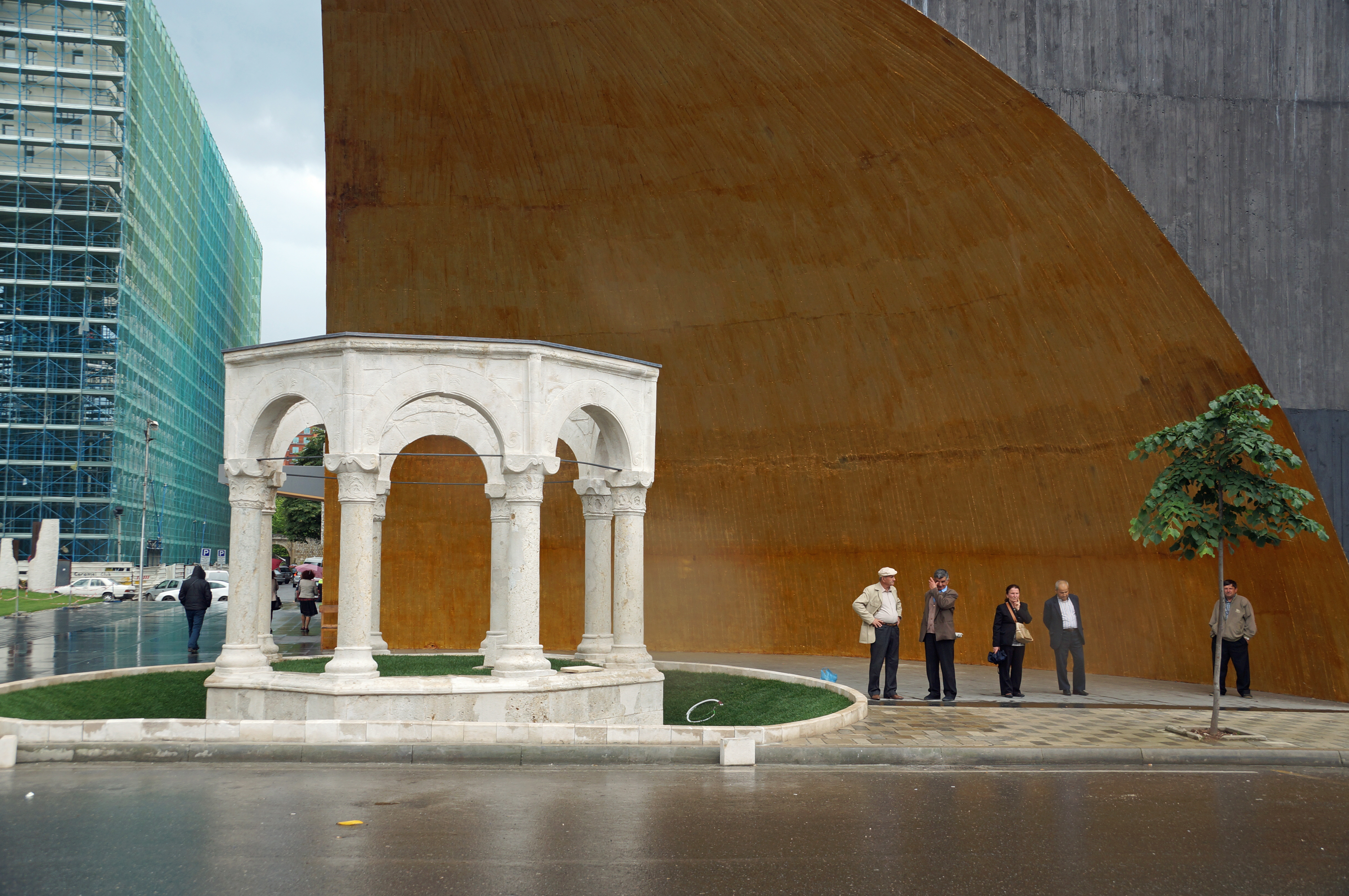
Kapllan Pasha Tomb underneath TID Tower complex

== See also ==
- List of tallest buildings in Albania
- Landmarks in Tirana
- Kapllan Pasha Tomb
