= Skanderbeg Monument =

Bronze sculpture in Albania

- Monumenti i Skënderbeut
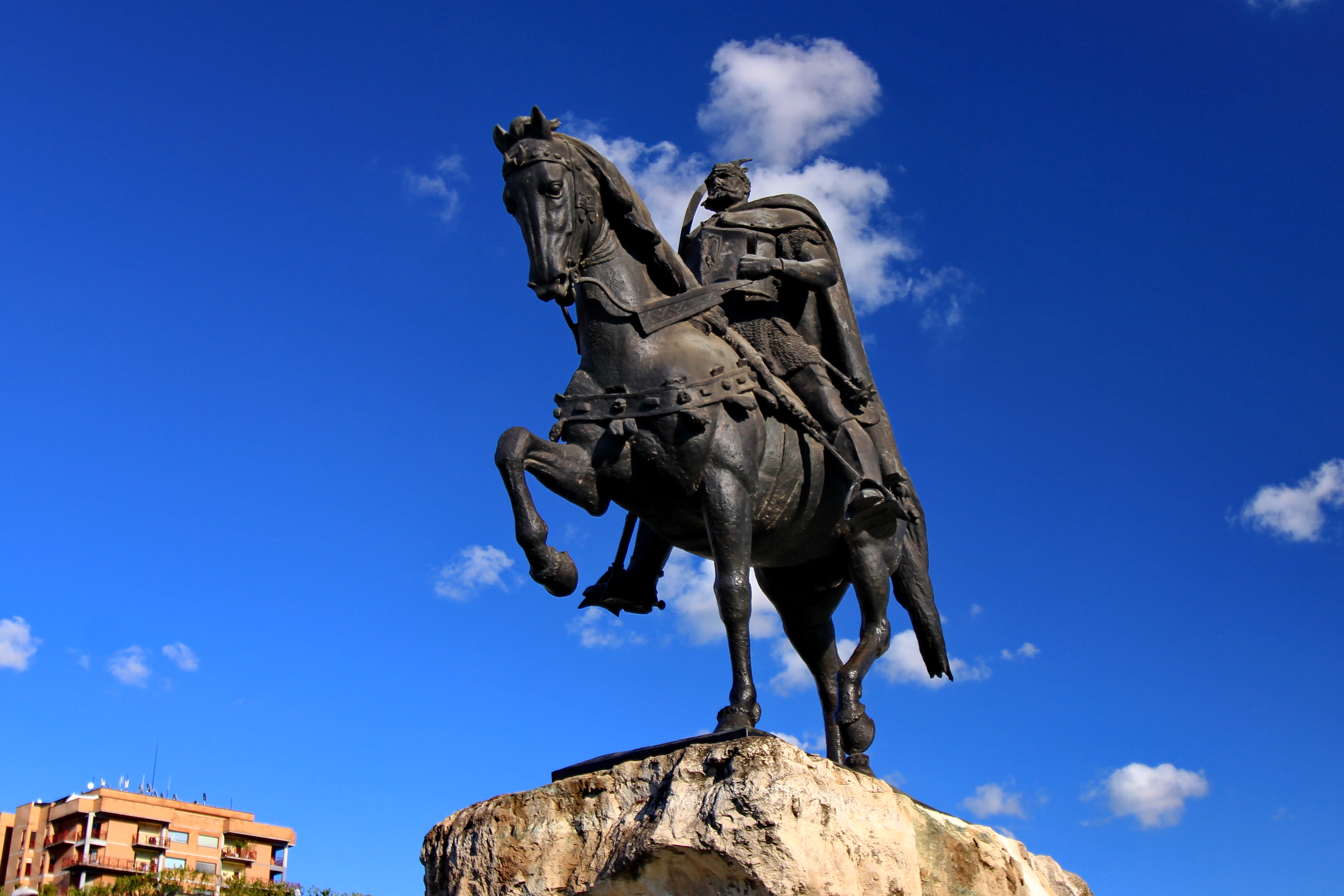
- Interactive map of Skanderbeg Monument
- Location: Skanderbeg Square; Tirana Albania
- Coordinates: 41.3275°N 19.8188°E
- Designer: Odhise Paskali, Andrea Mano and Janaq Paço
- Type: Historical Monument
- Material: Bronze on stone pedestal
- Length: 11 metres (36 ft)
- Opening date: January 1968
- Dedicated to: Gjergj Kastrioti Skënderbeu

The Skanderbeg Monument is a monument in the Skanderbeg Square in Tirana, Albania. It commemorates Skanderbeg (1405–1468), the national hero in Albania for resisting the Ottomans. There was a statue of Stalin

Created by Odhise Paskali, the 11 metres (36 ft) monument was inaugurated in January 1968 on the 500th anniversary of the death of Skanderbeg.

== Gallery ==
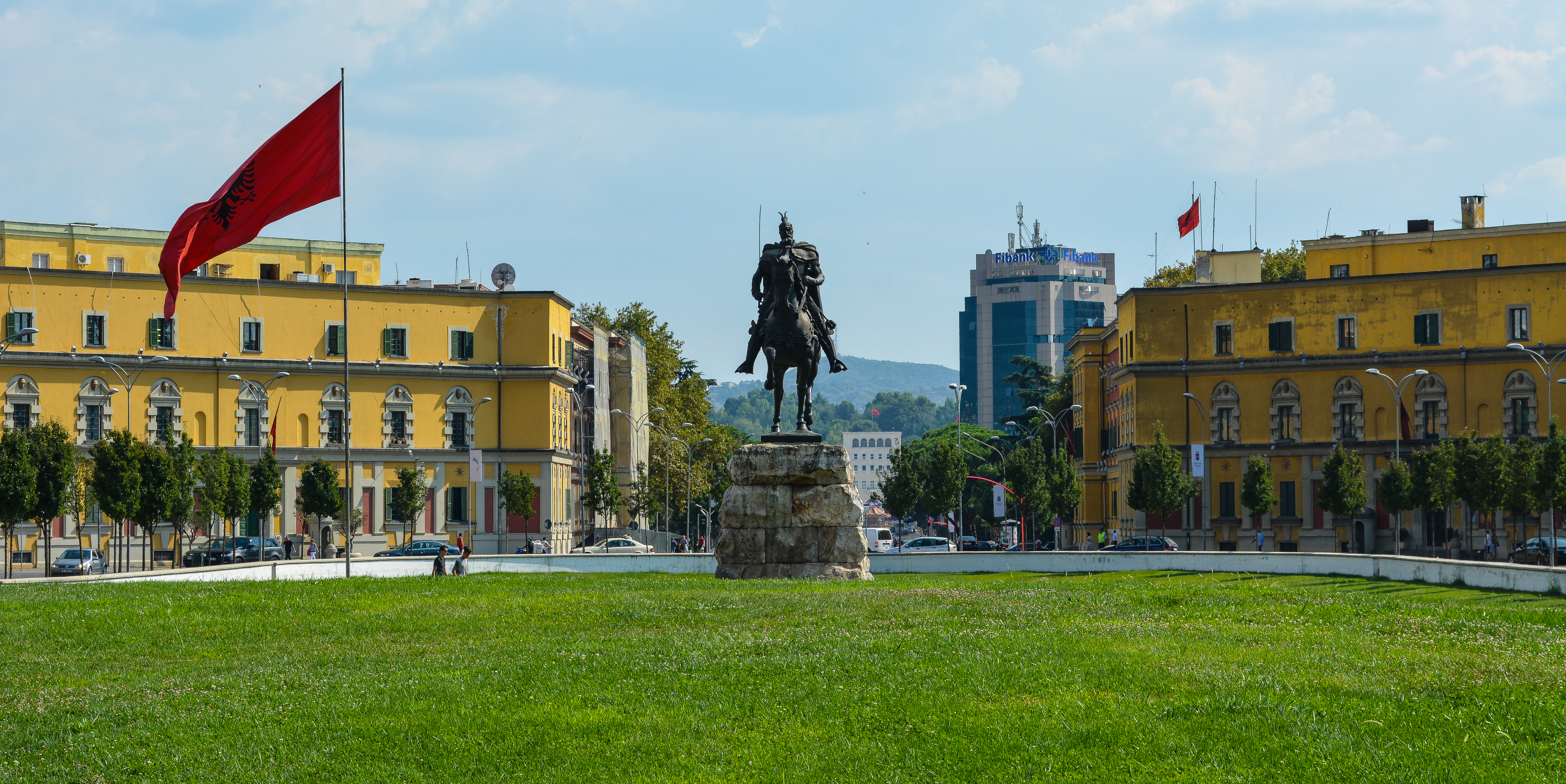

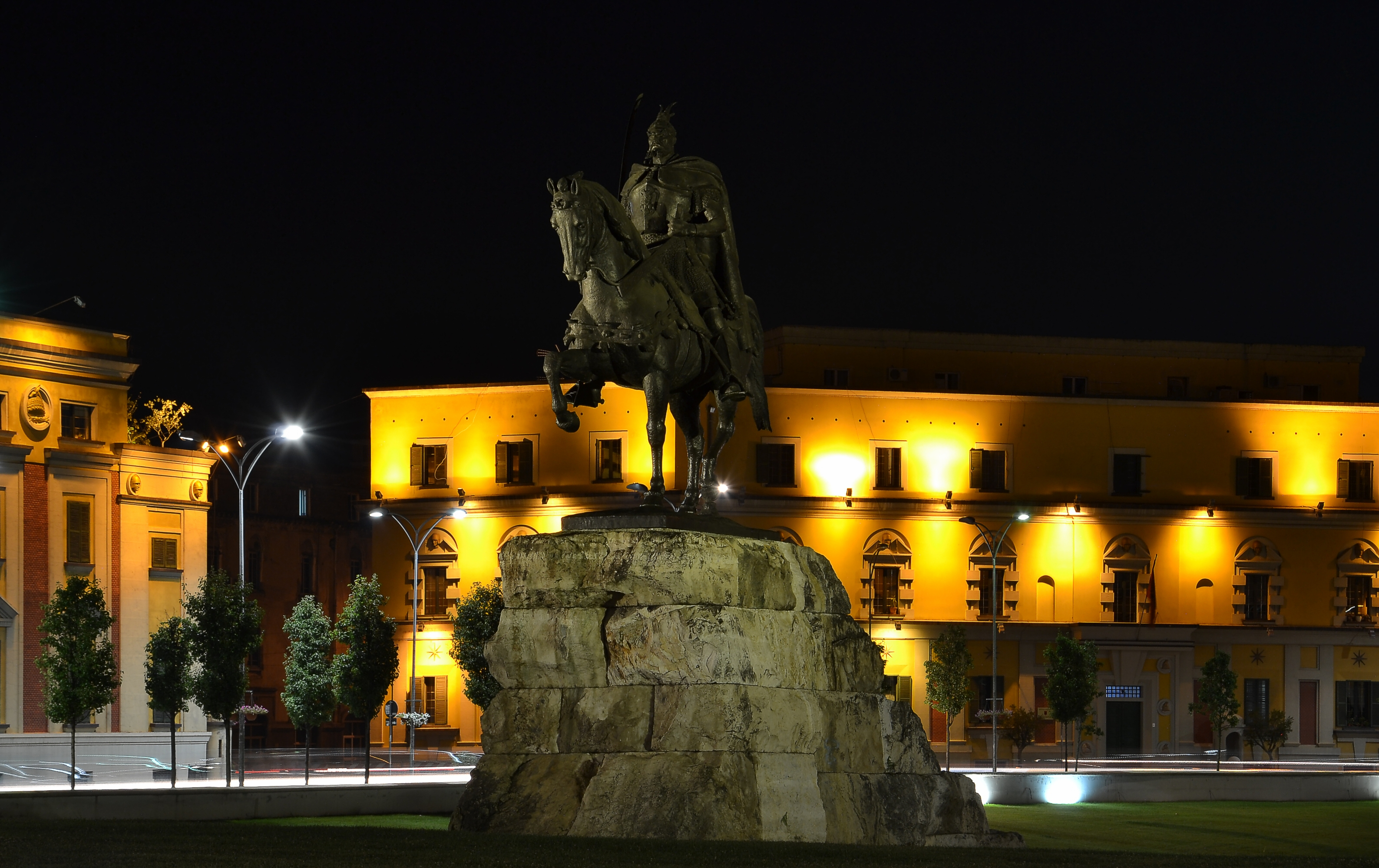

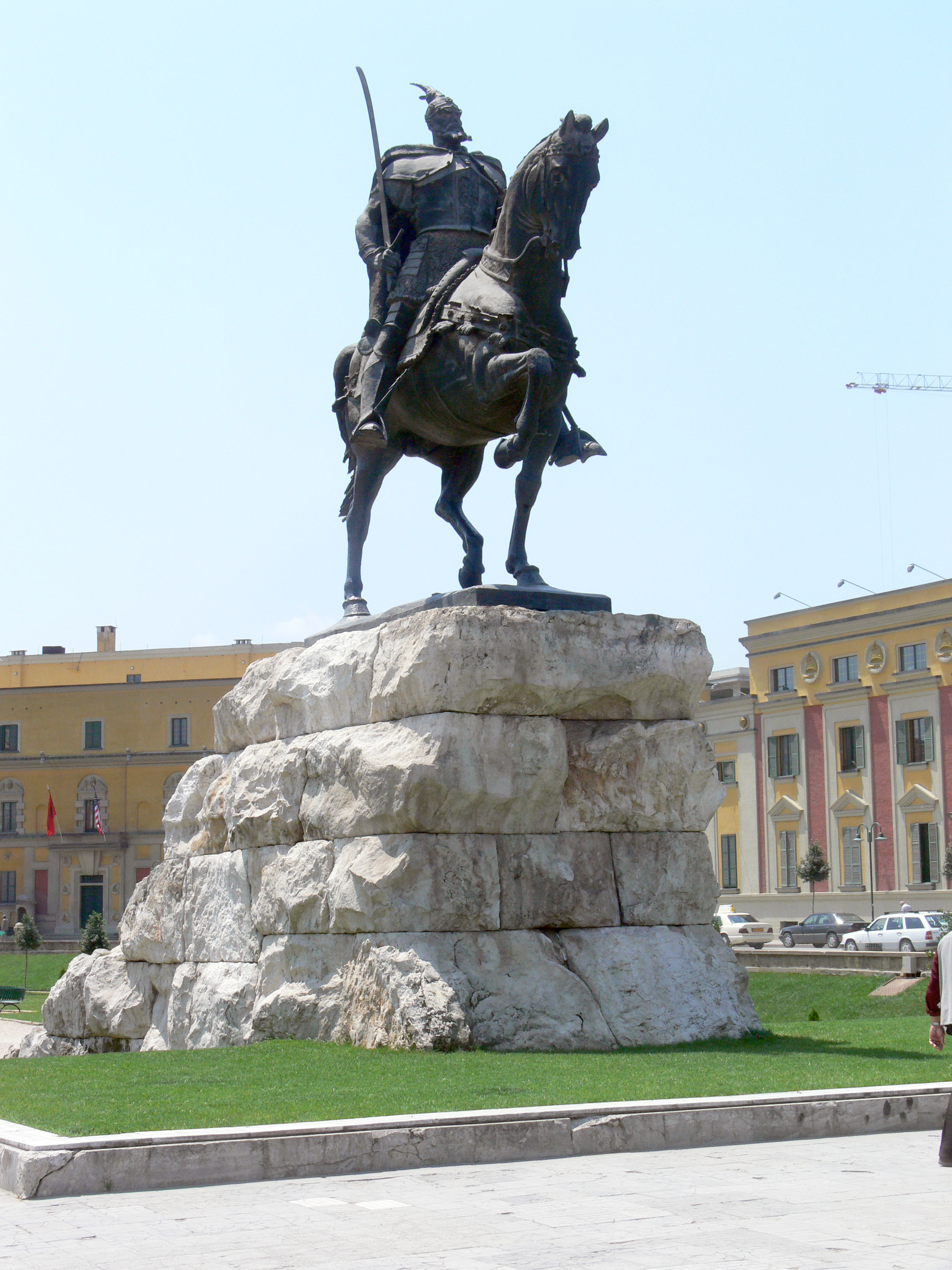

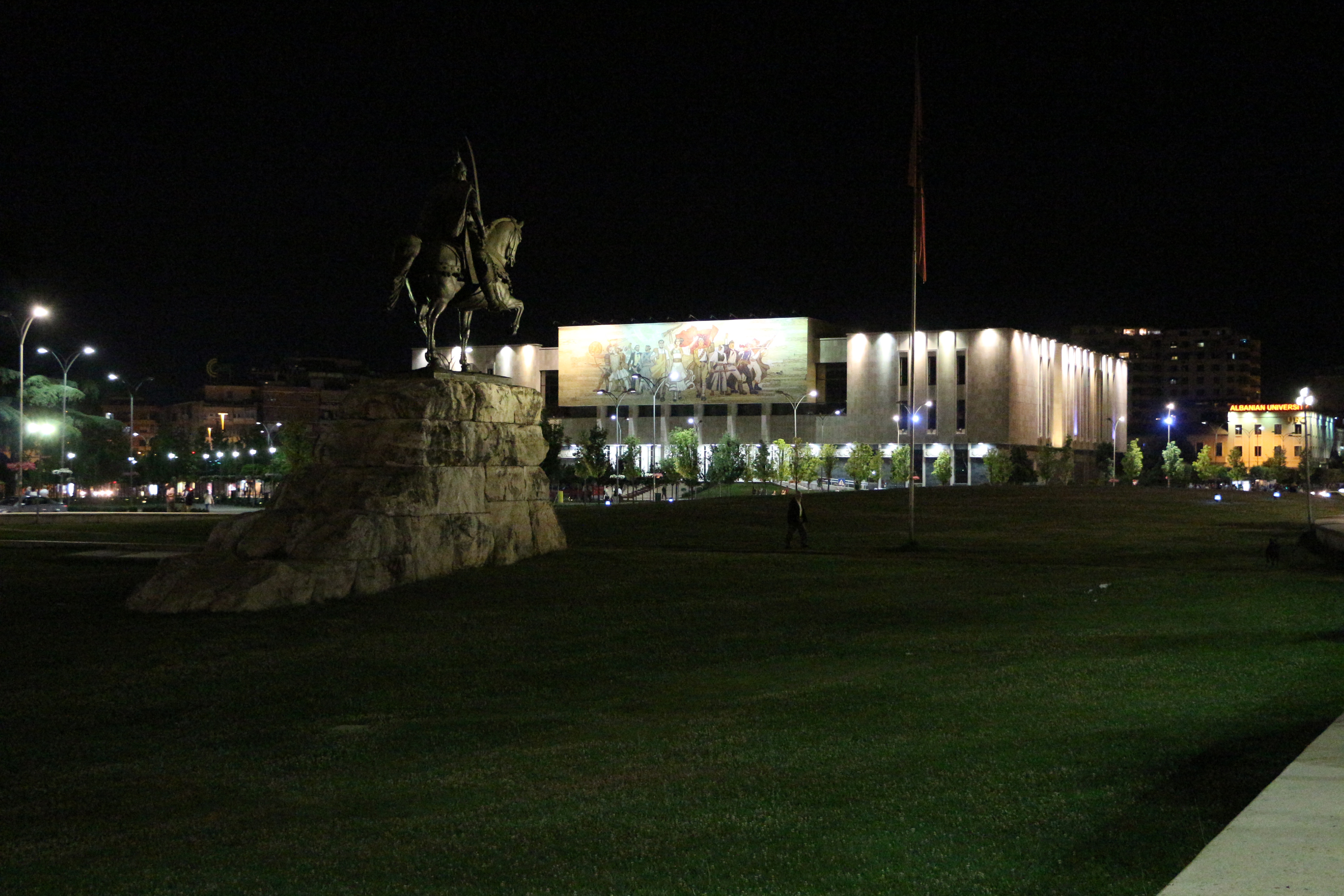

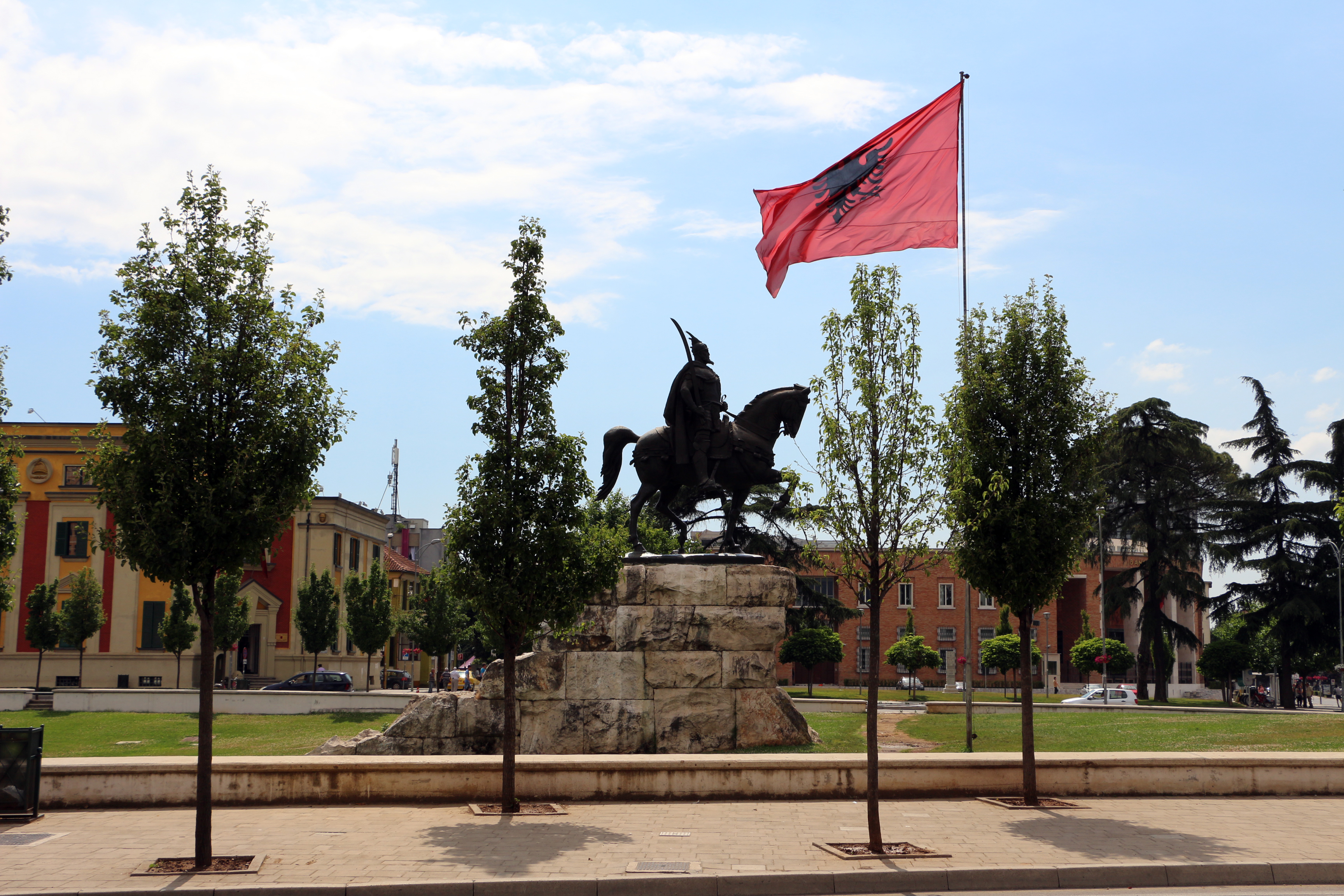

== See also ==
- Skanderbeg Square
- Tirana
- Architecture of Albania
