= Durrës Street =

Street in Tirana, Albania

Coordinates: 41°19′52″N 19°48′36″E

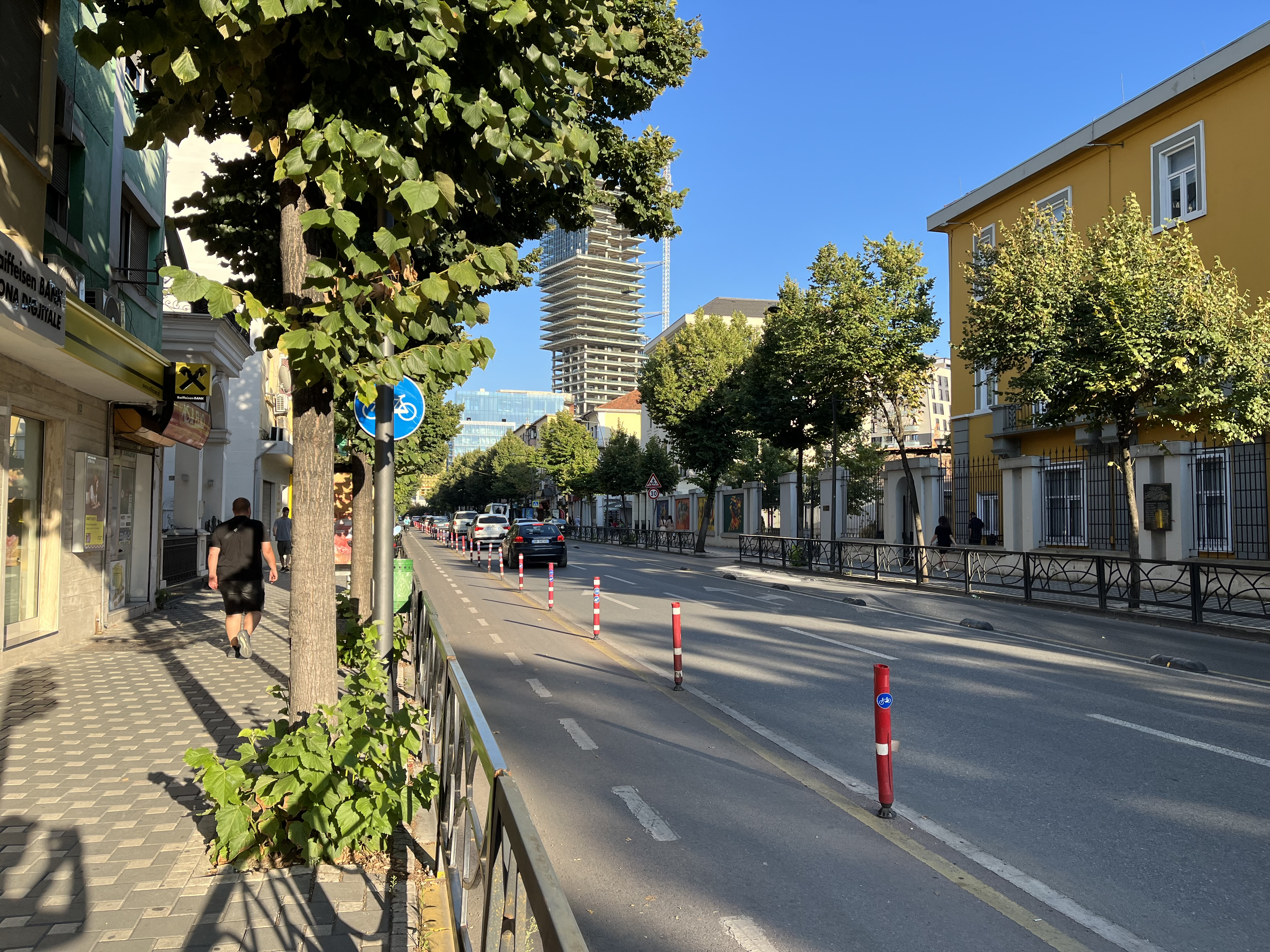
Durrës Street

Durrës Street (Albanian: Rruga e Durresit, formerly Rruga Kongresi i Përmetit) is a major street of Tirana, Albania. It is one of the most important street of western Tirana and runs west from the central Skanderbeg Square for several kilometres until it reaches the sea to the north of Durrës.
