= Janaq Paço =

Albanian sculptor (1914–1991)

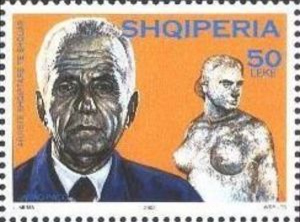
Janaq Paço on a 2003 stamp of Albania

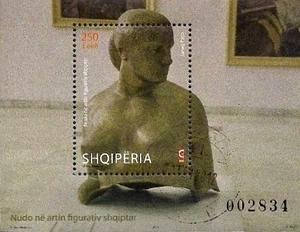
Nude (1964) by Paço from the National Art Gallery, Tirana, on a 2011 stamp sheet of Albania

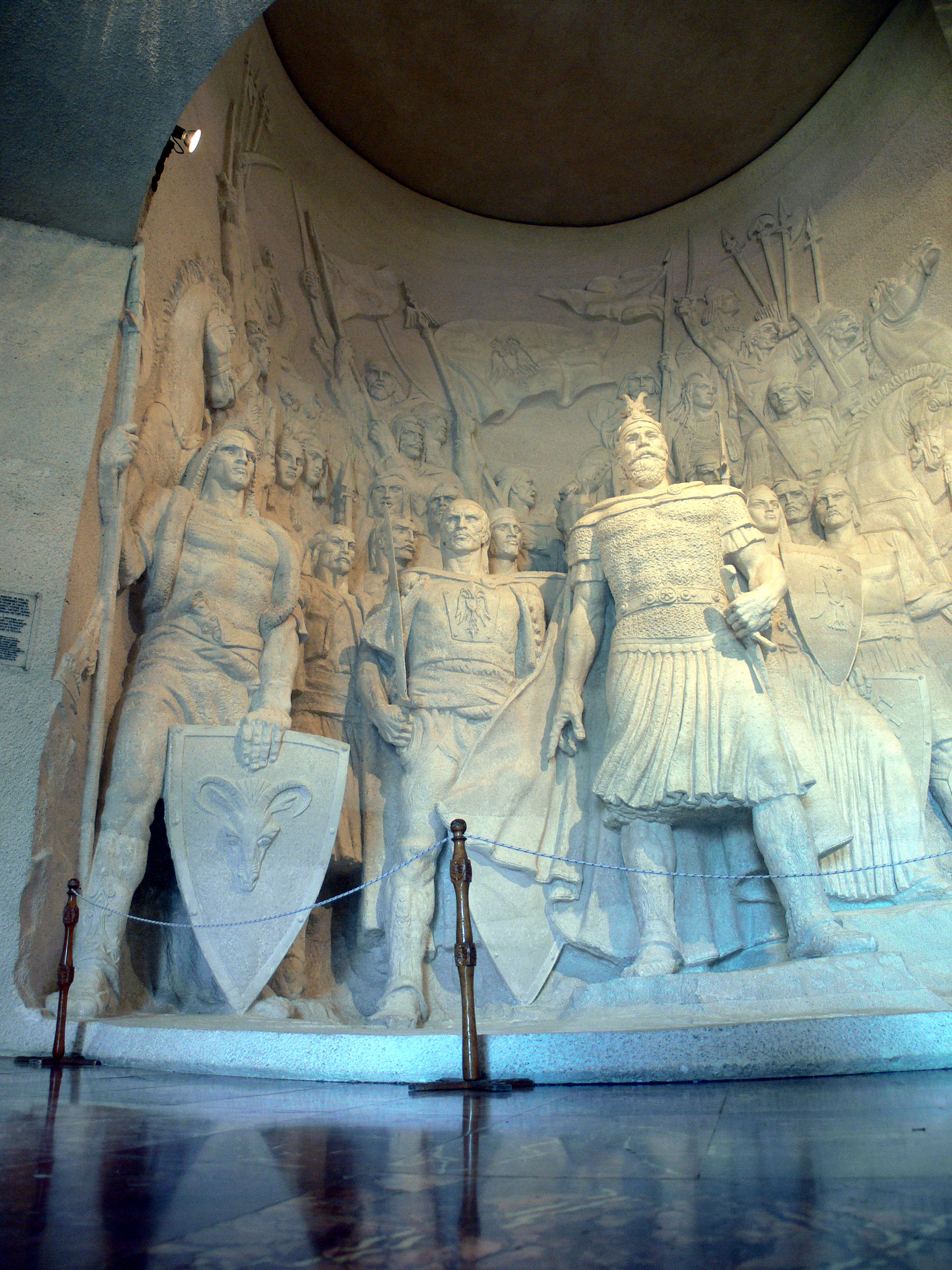
Scanderbeg with the people (1982) by Paço's at Skanderbeg Museum in Krujë

Janaq Paço (14 March 1914, Konitsa, Kingdom of Greece – 11 July 1991, Tirana, Albania) was one of the best known Albanian sculptors of the 20th century. Some of his prominent works include the monuments of Skanderbeg in Kruja, Tirana, and Pristina, Kosovo (reproduced post-mortem), as well as The Gladiators.

== Life ==
Paço was of Aromanian origins. Paço was one of the founders of the Albanian sculpture school and tradition. In addition to his realistic sculptures, Paço created also many nude sculptures during the 1960s and 1970s, and was obliged to destroy them, fearing punishment from the Communist Regime. During this time he was criticized by other members of the Albanian League of Writers and Artists. This led him to gradually dissociate himself from the League.

== Bibliography of art works ==
Main part of his work:

- The monument of Skanderbeg in Krujë (started in 1949; finished in 1959), which was later copied in Pristina, Kosovo, after the 1998–1999 Kosovo War.
- The monument of Skanderbeg (1968), today in "Scanderbeg Square" in Tirana, where he co-worked with the first Albanian sculptor Odhise Paskali and Andrea Mano
- Two statues of Fan Noli, and one of Alexander Moissi (1960s)
- The Gladiators (1973) (3.5 m), anticipated to be placed at the entrance of the ancient Durrës Amphitheatre in Durrës
- The sculptural group Skanderbeg with the People (1982), which is placed in the entrance of the Skanderbeg Museum in Krujë

== Awards and prizes ==
- In 1984, he was awarded the title People's Artist of Albania.
- At the exhibition "Spring '90" at the National Art Gallery of Albania, Paço won first prize with his art work Girl's Portrait (Albanian: Portret vajze), which one year earlier (before the fall of communism in Albania) was prohibited to be exhibited inside the gallery as a "modern art work".

== See also ==
- Ibrahim Kodra
- List of Albanians
- List of sculptors
- Modern Albanian art
