= Palace of Culture of Tirana =

Palace of Culture in Tirana, Albania

Coordinates: 41°19′44″N 19°49′10″E

- Pallati i Kulturës
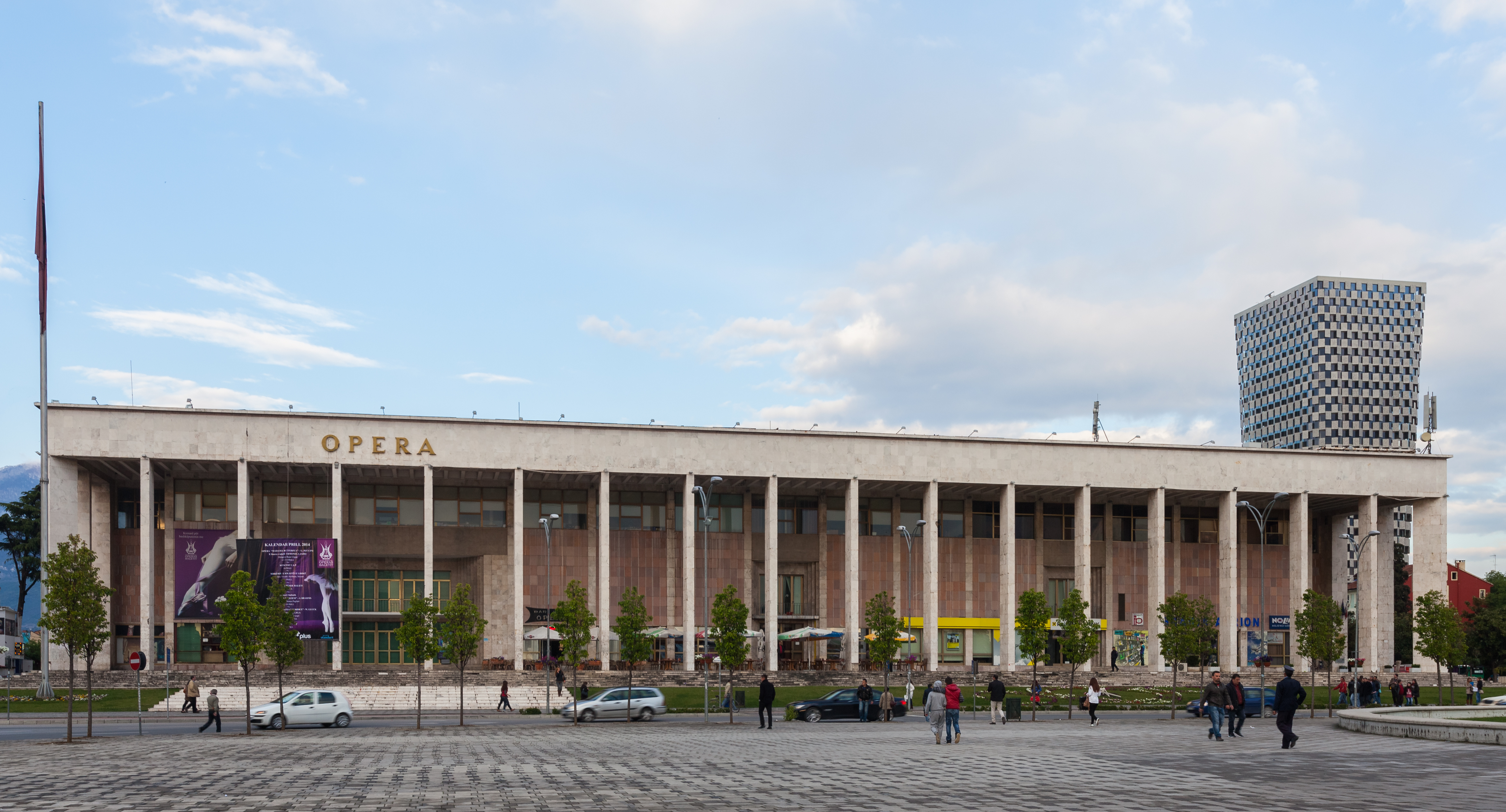
- Interactive map of the Palace of Culture of Tirana area

General information
- Type: Palace of Culture, Opera House
- Architectural style: Stalinist architecture
- Location: Tirana, Albania, Skanderbeg Square
- Construction started: 1959
- Completed: 1963

Height
- Height: 50 meters

The Palace of Culture of Tirana (Albanian: Pallati i Kulturës) houses the National Library of Albania as well as the National Theatre of Opera and Ballet. Situated in Skanderbeg Square, it was originally built on the Pazari i Vjetër (English: Old Bazzar) area of Tirana at the behest of Enver Hoxha. The palace has changed little since its original construction in the 1960s.

The first stone of the new building was symbolically placed by Nikita Khrushchev in 1959. Construction was completed in 1963. The architecture is very similar to many communist-era social buildings in Eastern Europe.

Both the old bazaar and the historic mosque of Mahmud Muhsin Bey Stërmasi were destroyed under the plan, in adherence to Communist Albania's strict state atheism. The Ottoman mosque had been built from 1837 to 1840 and had a tiled roof as well as a striking minaret with a sherefe.

== See also ==
- Academy of Music and Arts of Albania
- National Theatre of Opera and Ballet of Albania
- National Gallery of Figurative Arts of Albania
