= Odhise Paskali =

Albanian sculptor (1903–1985)

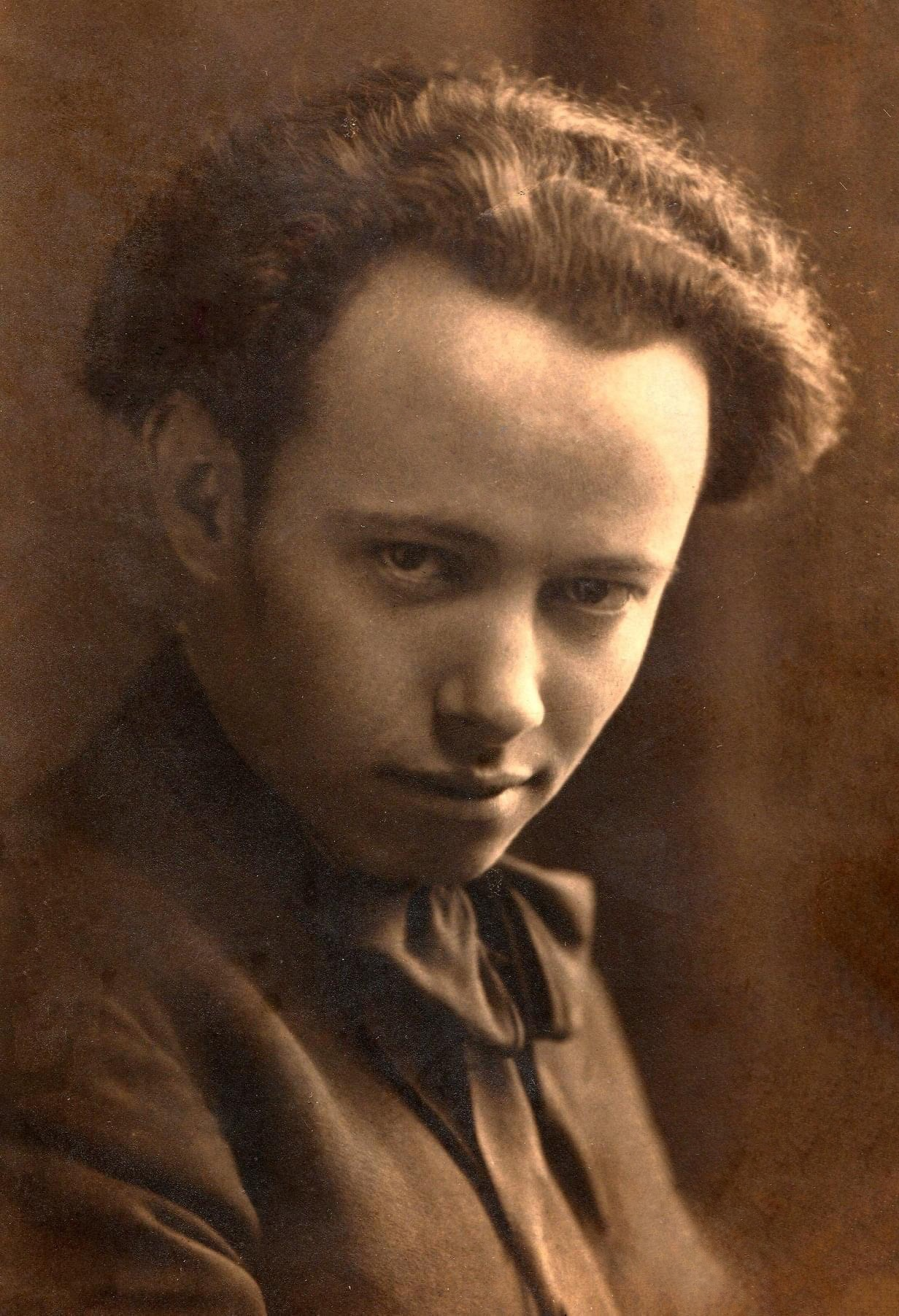
- Portrait of a young Paskali, 1926
- Born: 22 December 1903; Përmet, Ottoman Empire
- Died: 13 September 1985 (aged 81); Tirana, Albania
- Education: Universita di Torino
- Known for: Sculpture, Ceramics
- Notable work: Skanderbeg Monument (1968)
- Awards: People's Artist Honor of the Nation

Odhise Paskali (22 December 1903 – 13 September 1985) was an Albanian sculptor. For his contribution, he was awarded the People's Artist of Albania award.

== Early life ==
Paskali was born in 1903 in Përmet, Ottoman Empire. In 1925 when Paskali realized The Hungry he sent the work along with Face of a Girl (Fytyrë vajze) to Ahmet Zogu, then Prime Minister of Albania, and asked in return for a scholarship to study in an academy of arts in Italy. Zogu fulfilled his desire by sending him to Turin. As a student in Turin, he initiated the Albanian Student Association (Studenti shqiptar) and the magazine of the Albanian Students of Turin. He graduated in 1927 in Art Critique at the Literature and Philosophy School of the Kingdom of Italy University in Turin. In the 1930s he was one of the initiators of the association Friends of the Albanians (Miqt e Arbrit). He was also one of the organizers of the first exposure of arts and the first School of Painting in Tirana.

== Works ==
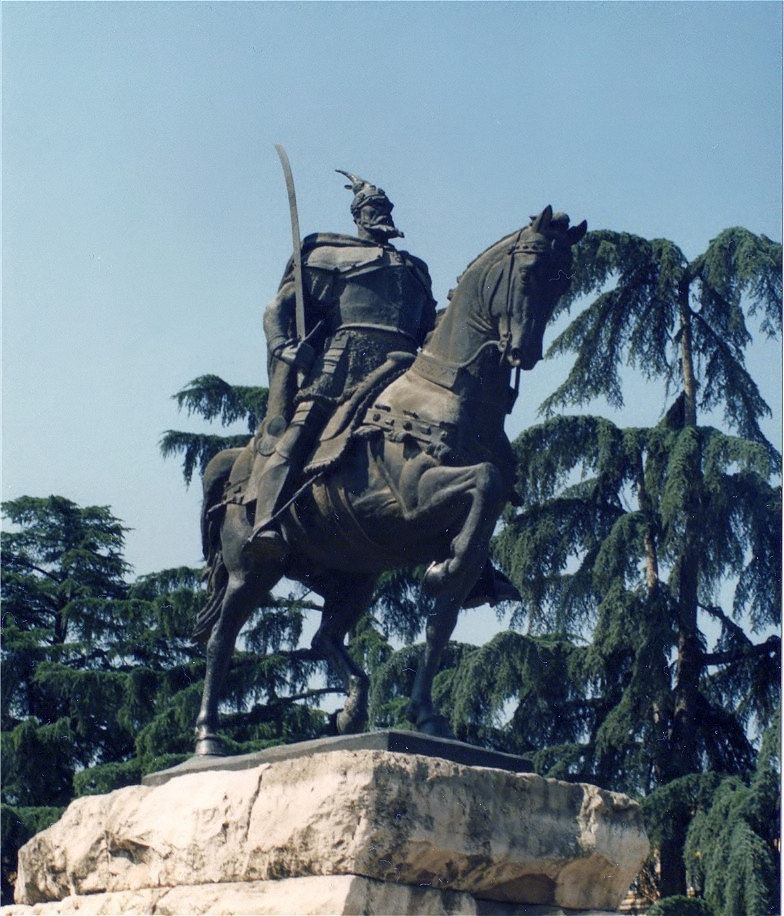
Skanderbeg Monument (Tirana), Albania

Paskali has finished around 600 sculptures. His first sculpture was The Hungry. His masterpiece is the Skanderbeg's monument in Tirana, Albania. Other important works are The Flag Bearer (Flamurtari 1932, Vlore), The National Fighter (Luftëtari Kombëtar 1932, Korçë), The Mountaneer (Malësori), Jeronim De Rada, Naim Frashëri, KETI, Themistokli Gërmenji, Naum Veqilharxhi, The Unknown Soldier (Ushtari i panjohur), Vojo Kushi, Fan Noli, Onufri, Ahmet Zogu, Enver Hoxha, Çerçiz Topulli, Pashko Vasa, Migjeni, Isa Boletini, Idriz Seferi. It is thought that many of Paskali's works can be found in Italy and Switzerland as they were taken away through pillage during the Fascist Italian Invasion.

Odhise was director of the National Gallery of Figurative Arts of Albania from 1957 to 1961.
