= Skanderbeg Square =

Public square in Tirana, Albania

- Public square
- {{{other_names}}}
- Sheshi Skënderbej
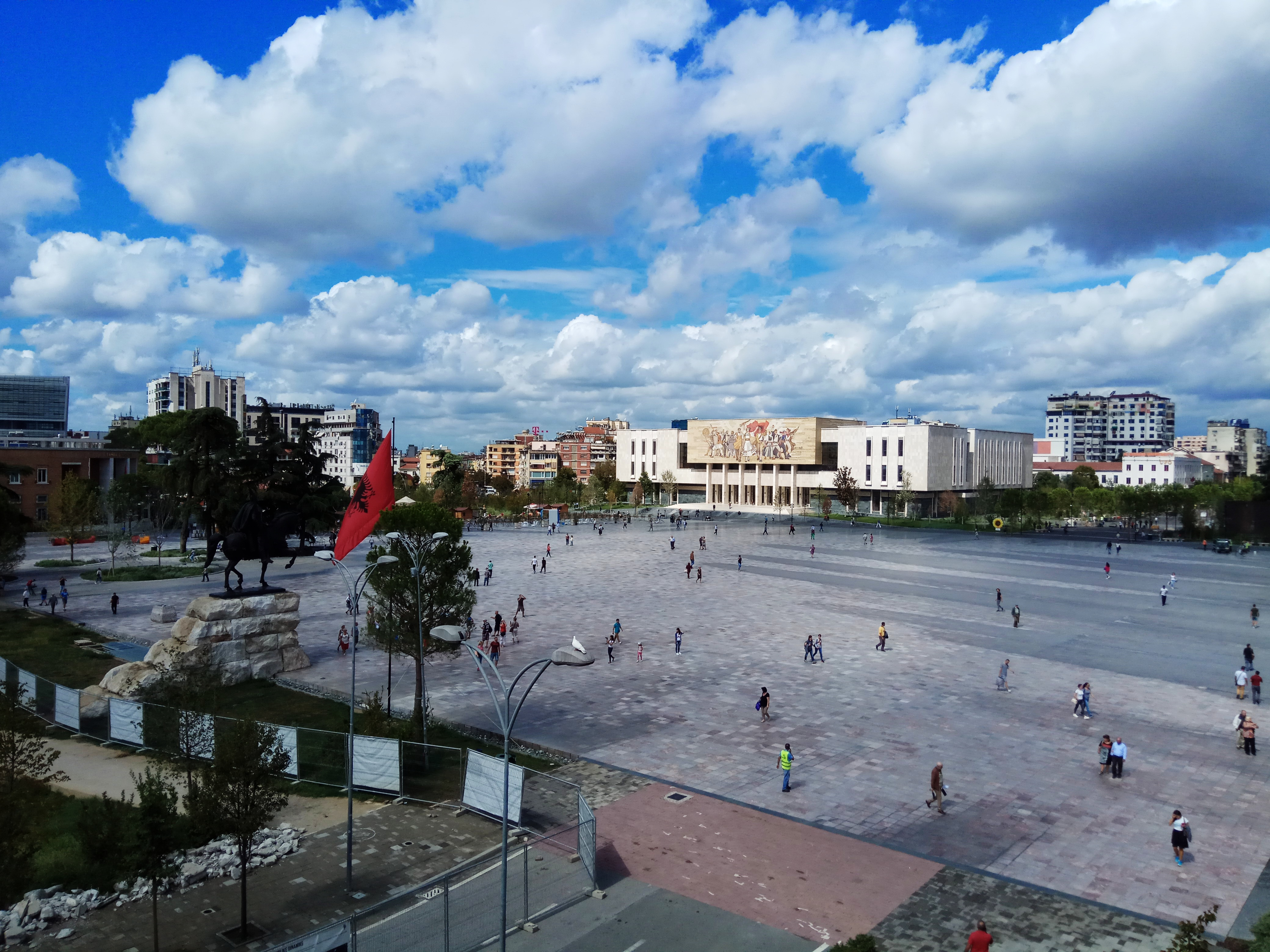
- View of the Skanderbeg Square from the Municipality Building
- Constructed: 1968 (naming)
- Area: 40,000 m^{2} (430,000 sq ft)
- Dedicated to: Gjergj Kastrioti Skendërbeu
- Location: Tirana, Tirana County
- Location within Albania
- Coordinates: 41°19′42″N 19°49′6″E Albania

The Skanderbeg Square (Albanian: Sheshi Skënderbej) is the main plaza in the centre of Tirana, Albania. The square is named after the Albanian national hero Skanderbeg. The total area is about 40,000 square metres. The Skanderbeg Monument dominates the square.

The city plan for Tirana was initially designed by Armando Brasini in 1925 and continued by Florestano Di Fausto in a Neo-Renaissance style with articulate angular solutions and giant order fascias. Following the Italian invasion of Albania the master plan was updated in 1939 by Gherardo Bosio.

Many buildings including the Tirana International Hotel, the Palace of Culture, the National Opera, the National Library, the Bank of Albania, the Ethem Bey Mosque, the Clock Tower, the City Hall, the Ministry of Infrastructure, the Ministry of Agriculture, the Ministry of Economy, the Ministry of Energy, and the National Historical Museum are situated at the square.

== History ==
In 1917, the Austrians built a public square, where the Skanderbeg Square is located nowadays. After Tirana became the capital in 1920, and the population increased, several city plans were planned. During the time of the Albanian monarchy from 1928 to 1939, the square was composed of a roundabout with a fountain in the center. The Old Bazaar used to be established on the grounds of modern-day Palace of Culture, the Orthodox Cathedral (present-day Tirana International Hotel), while the former City Hall building, on the grounds of where the National Historical Museum is located nowadays. A statue of Joseph Stalin was erected, where today the Skanderbeg Monument is located. Besides the construction of the above new elements during communism, the statue of Albania's leader Enver Hoxha was erected at the space between the National Historical Museum and the National Bank. Following the fall of communism in 1991, the statue would be removed amid student-led demonstrations. Since June 2017, the square has been renovated and is now part of the biggest pedestrian zone in the Balkans. The renovation has been distinguished with the European Prize for Urban Public Space in 2018. The project has also been praised at the Chicago Architecture Biennial, and has received second prize for Contemporary Architecture 2019 by the European Union.

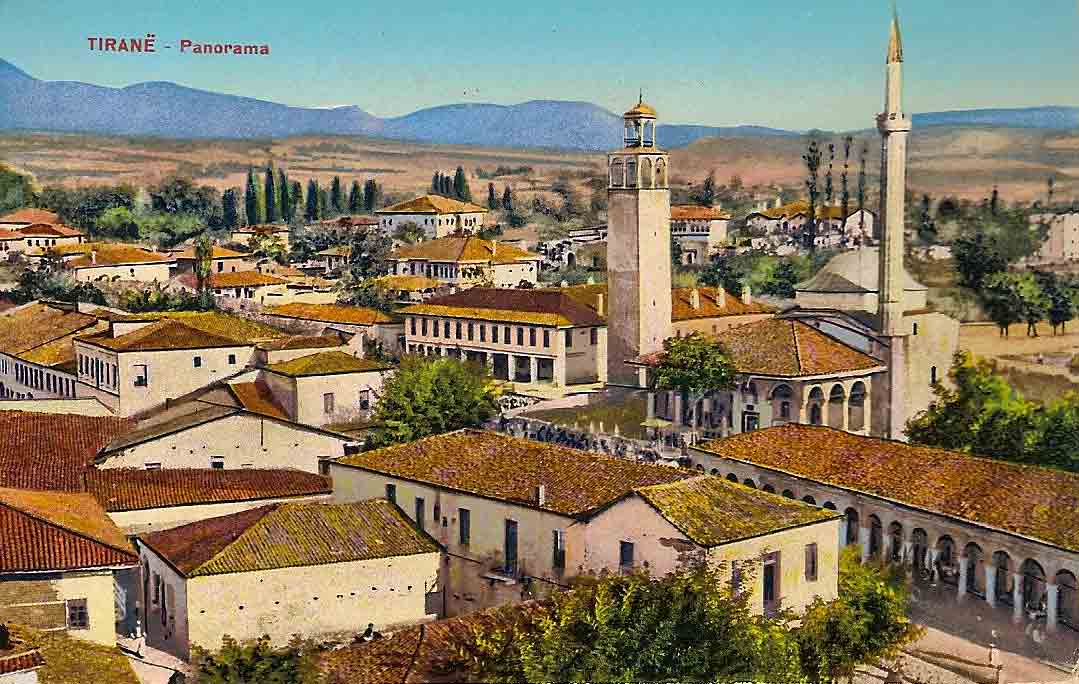
1923

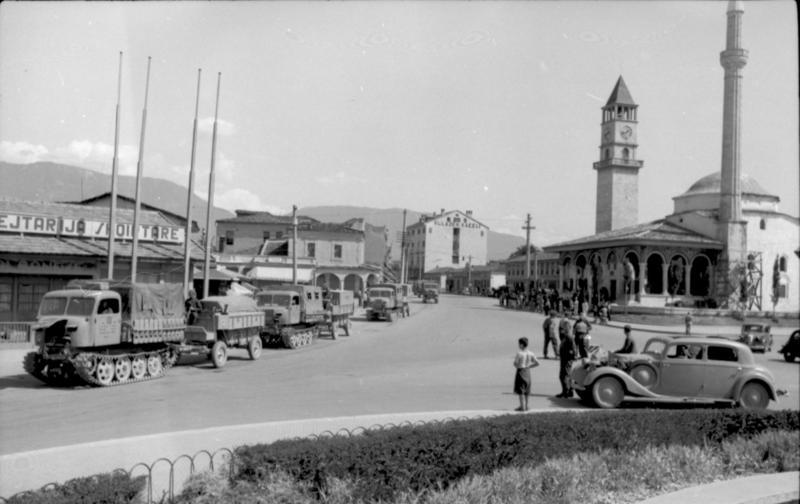
1943

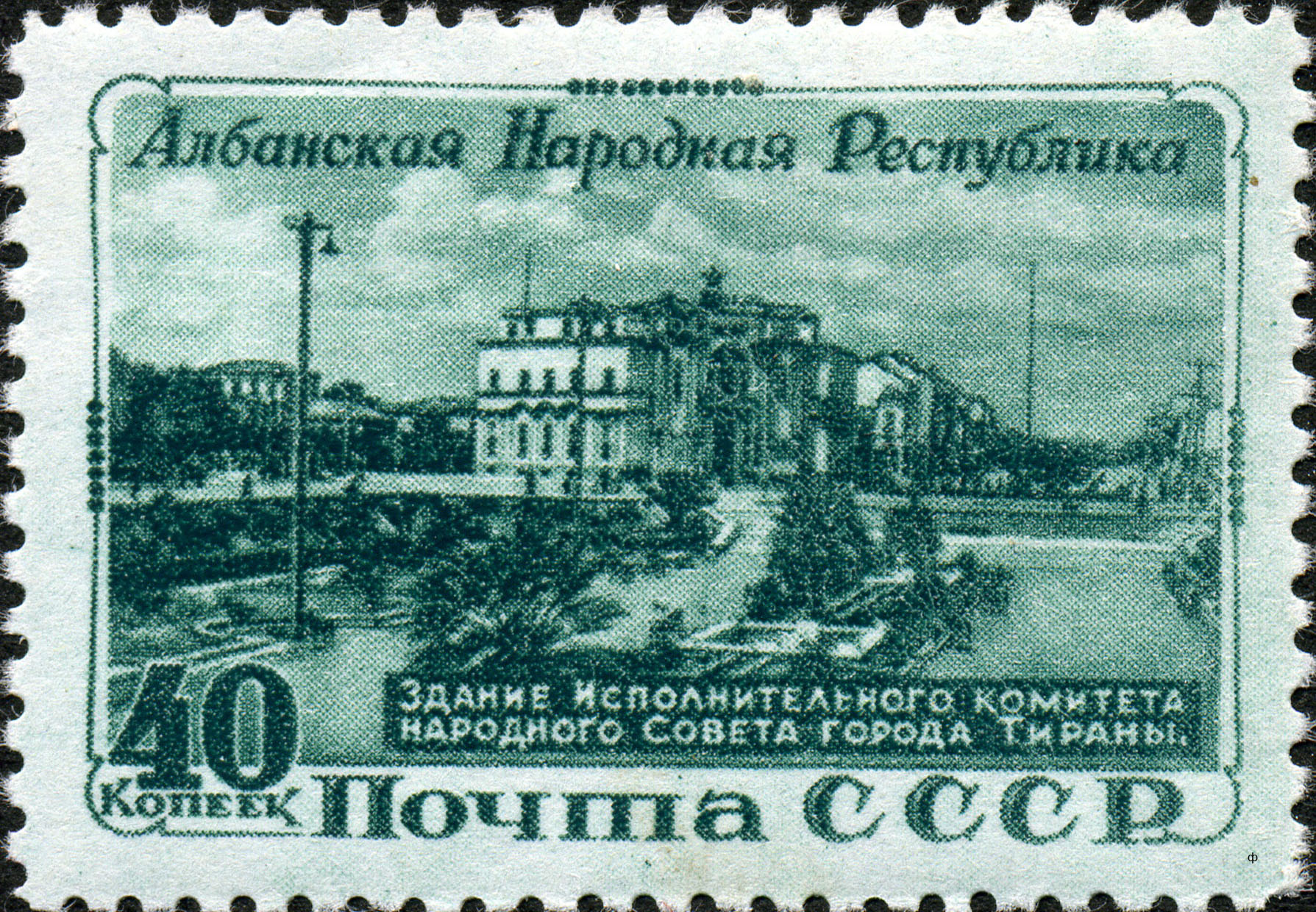
1951

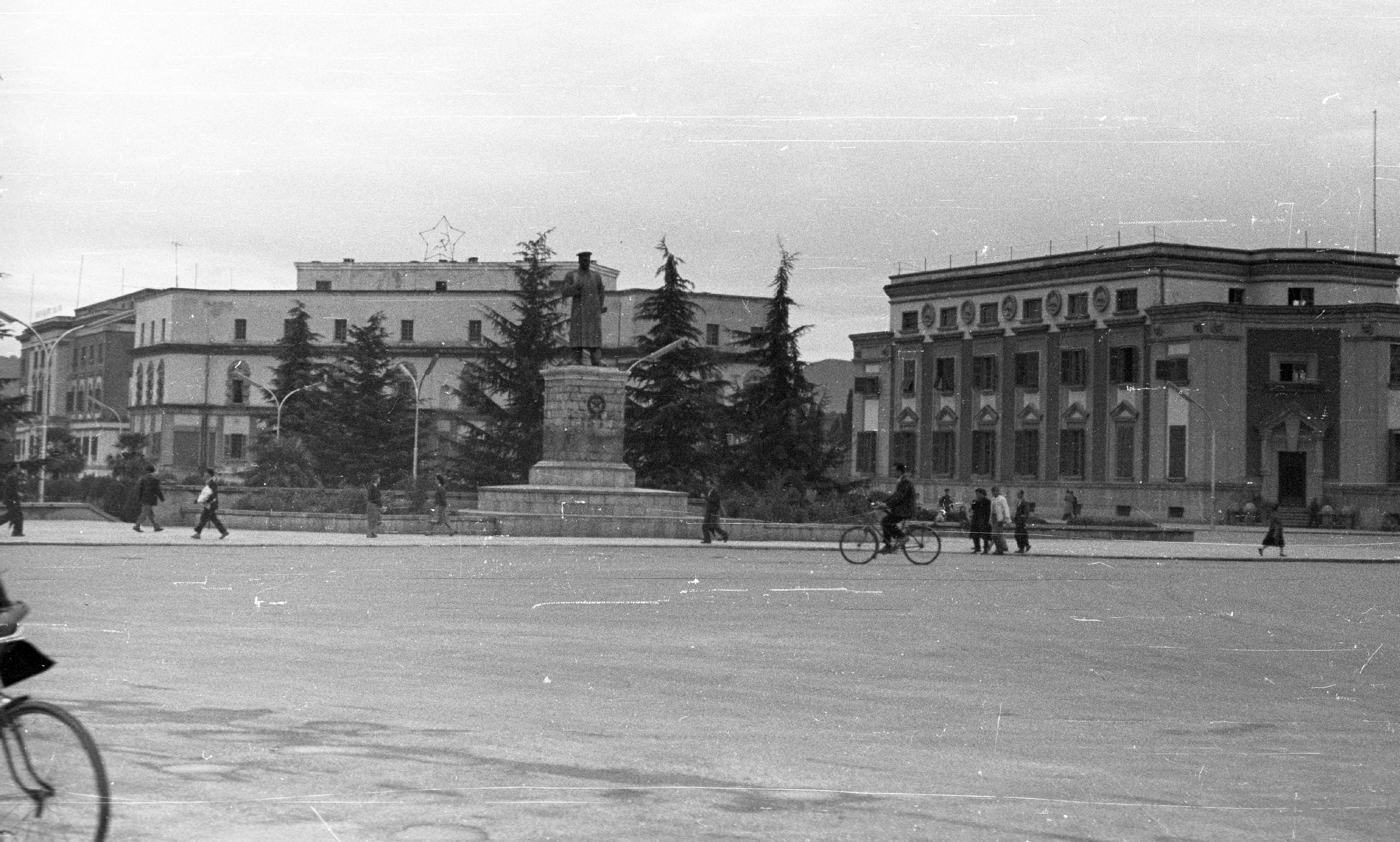
1963

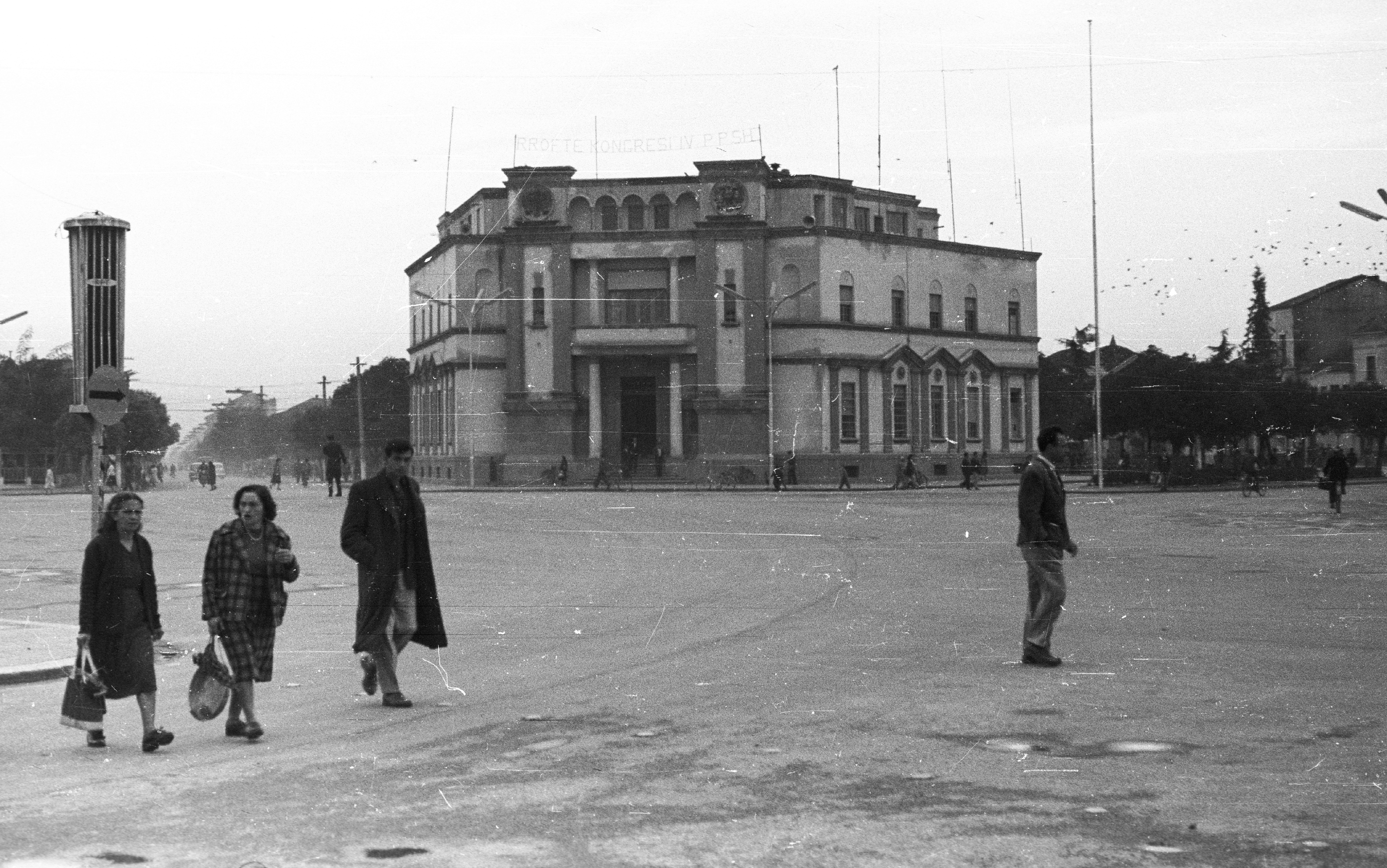
1963

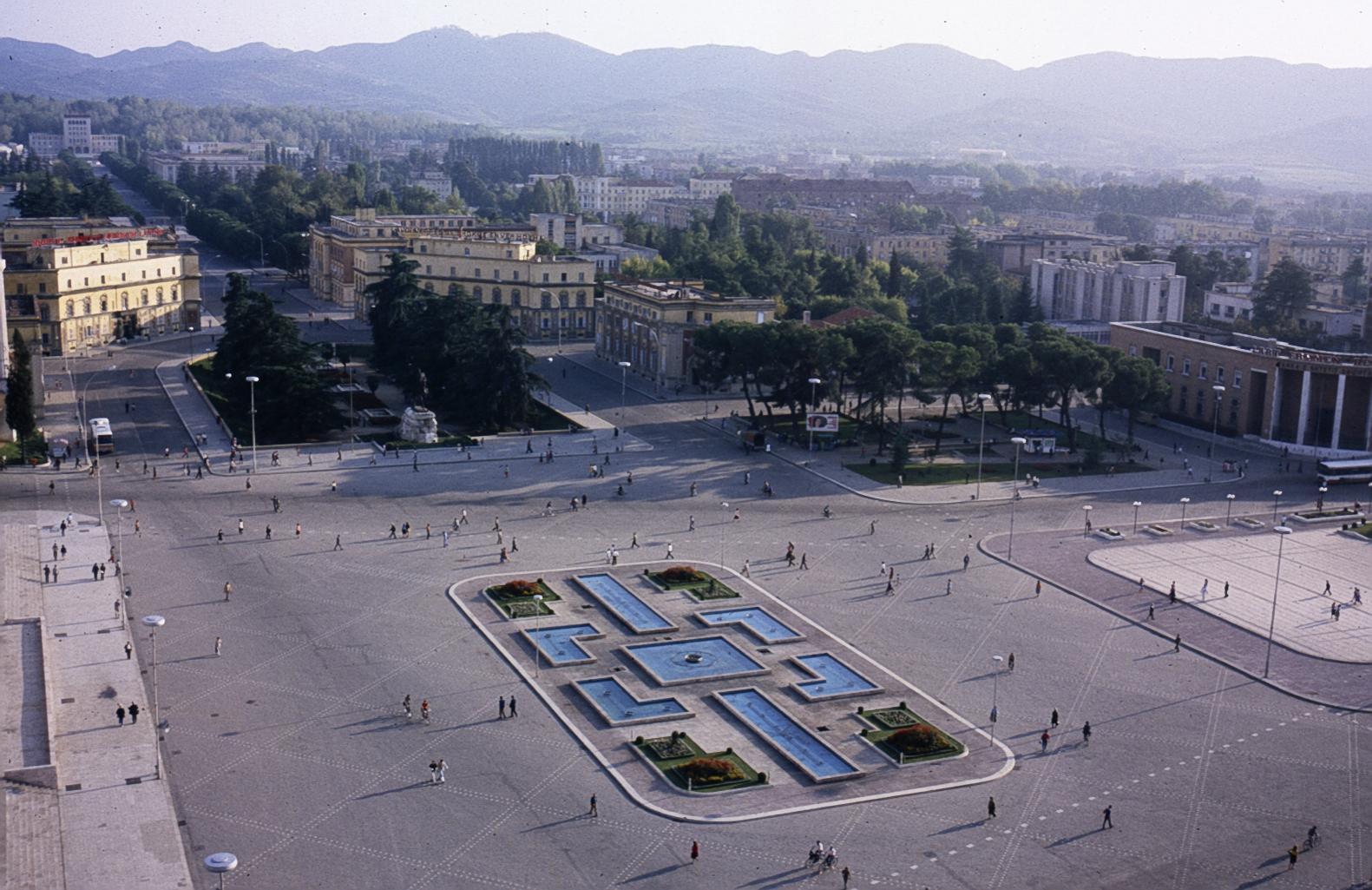
1988

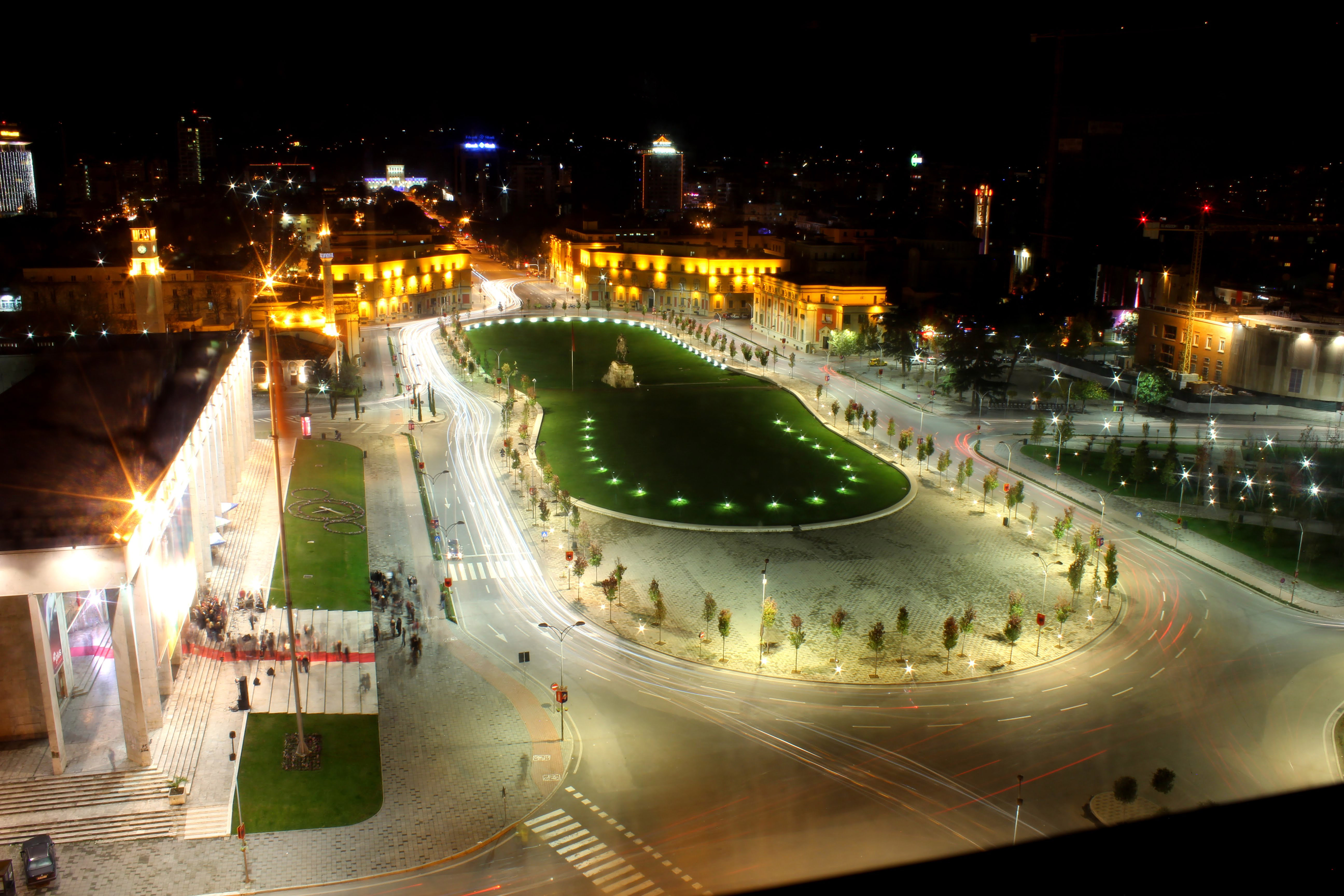
2012

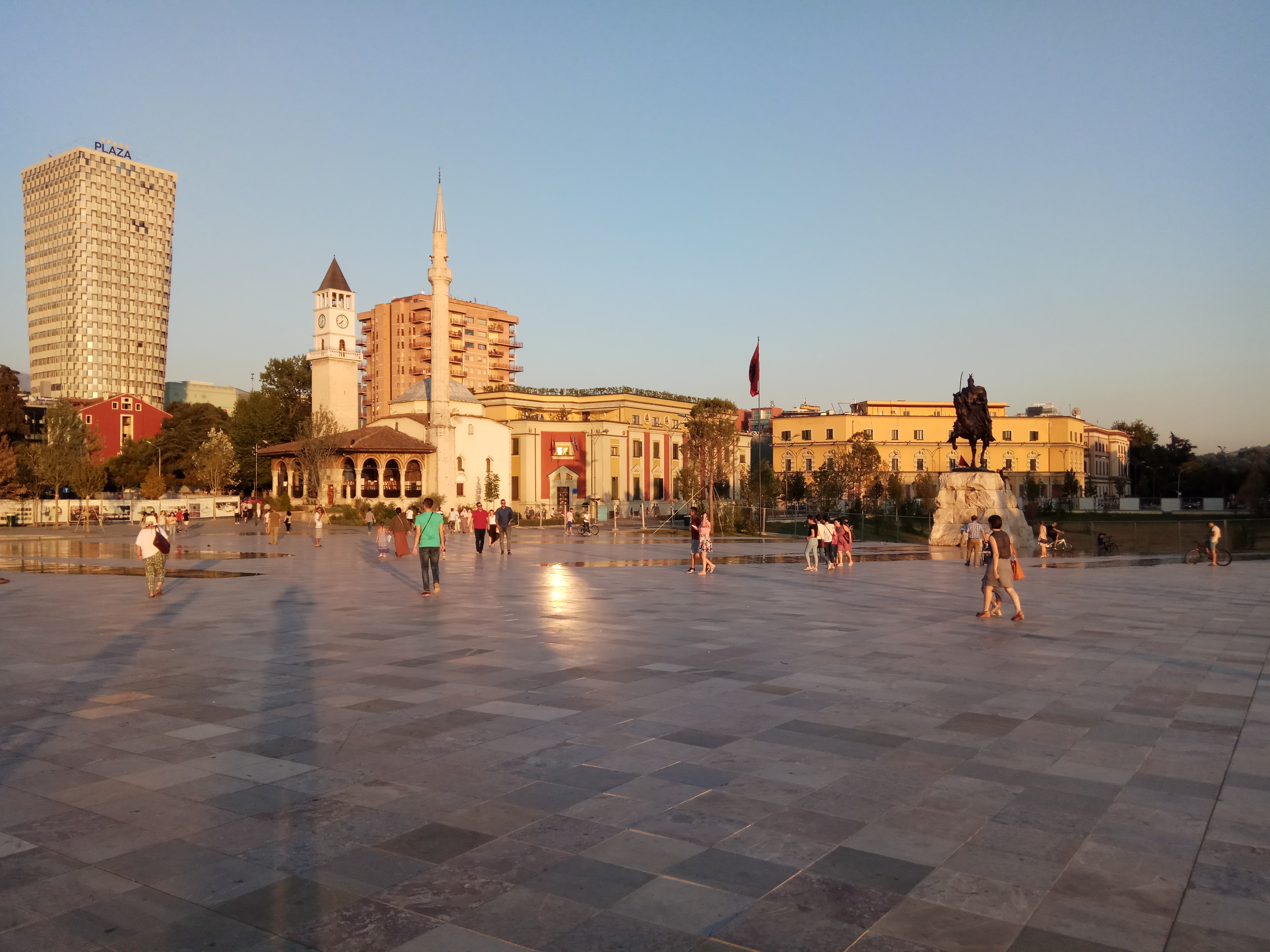
2018

== Projects ==
=== 2010 ===
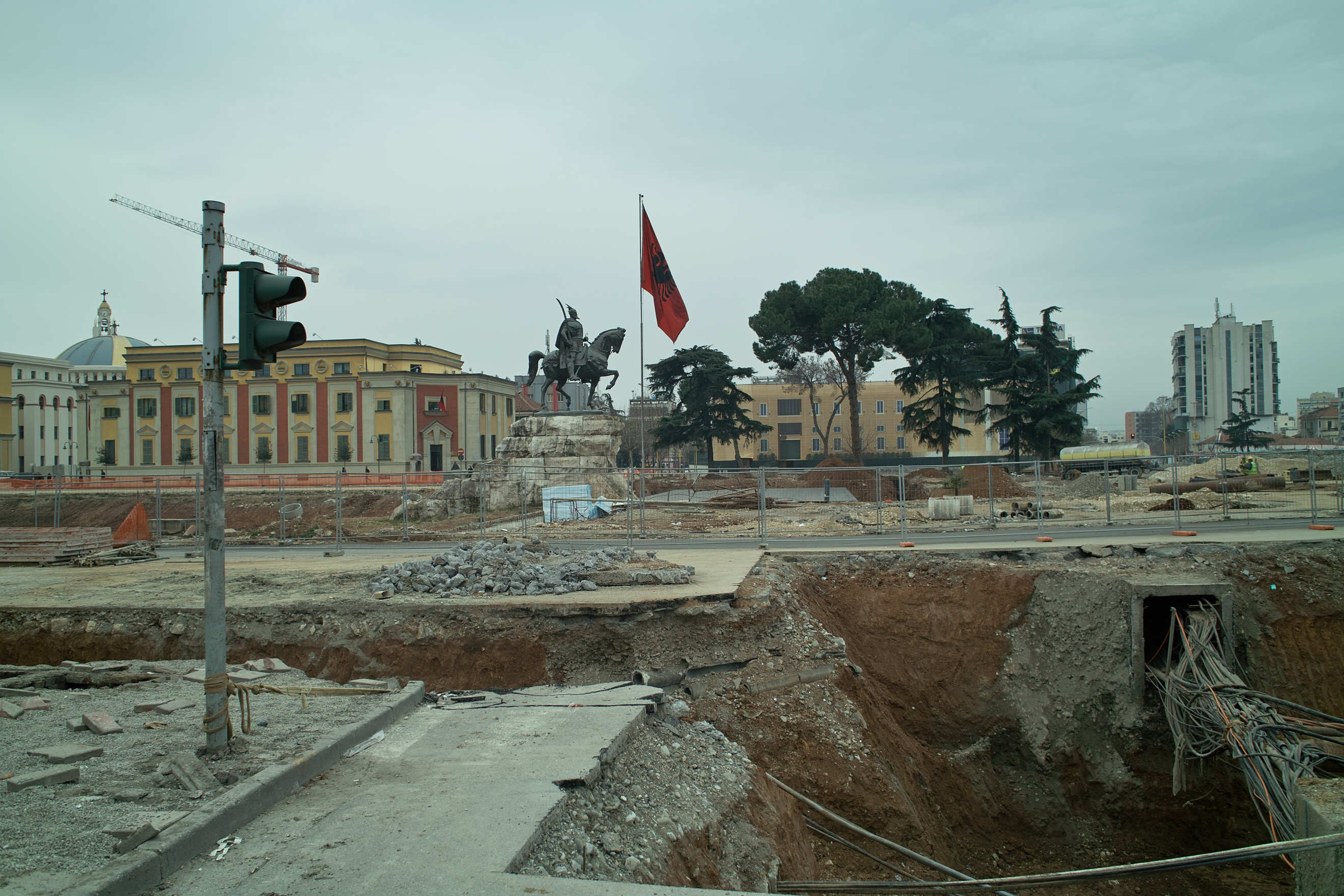
2010 construction works

Former Tirana mayor Edi Rama embarked on a plan to modernize and Europeanize the square. In March 2010, works began to transform the square into a pedestrians and public transport only area. A new fountain would use rain water as its water supply, while a two-meter high pyramid would be built and leveled with a 2.5% slope throughout the square. During the construction period, detour roads have been put in place to gradually establish the new and permanent road in the ring road around the square. The entire project is funded by a grant from the State of Kuwait.

=== 2011 ===
In September 2011, the earlier plan was scrapped and a new one introduced by the new mayor, Lulzim Basha. The use of the square by all motor vehicles was restored through the construction of a narrower road segment around the center of the square including bicycle lanes. The existing green field south of Skanderbeg's statue was extended northward for a few hundred meters, while trees were planted in most places.

=== 2016 ===
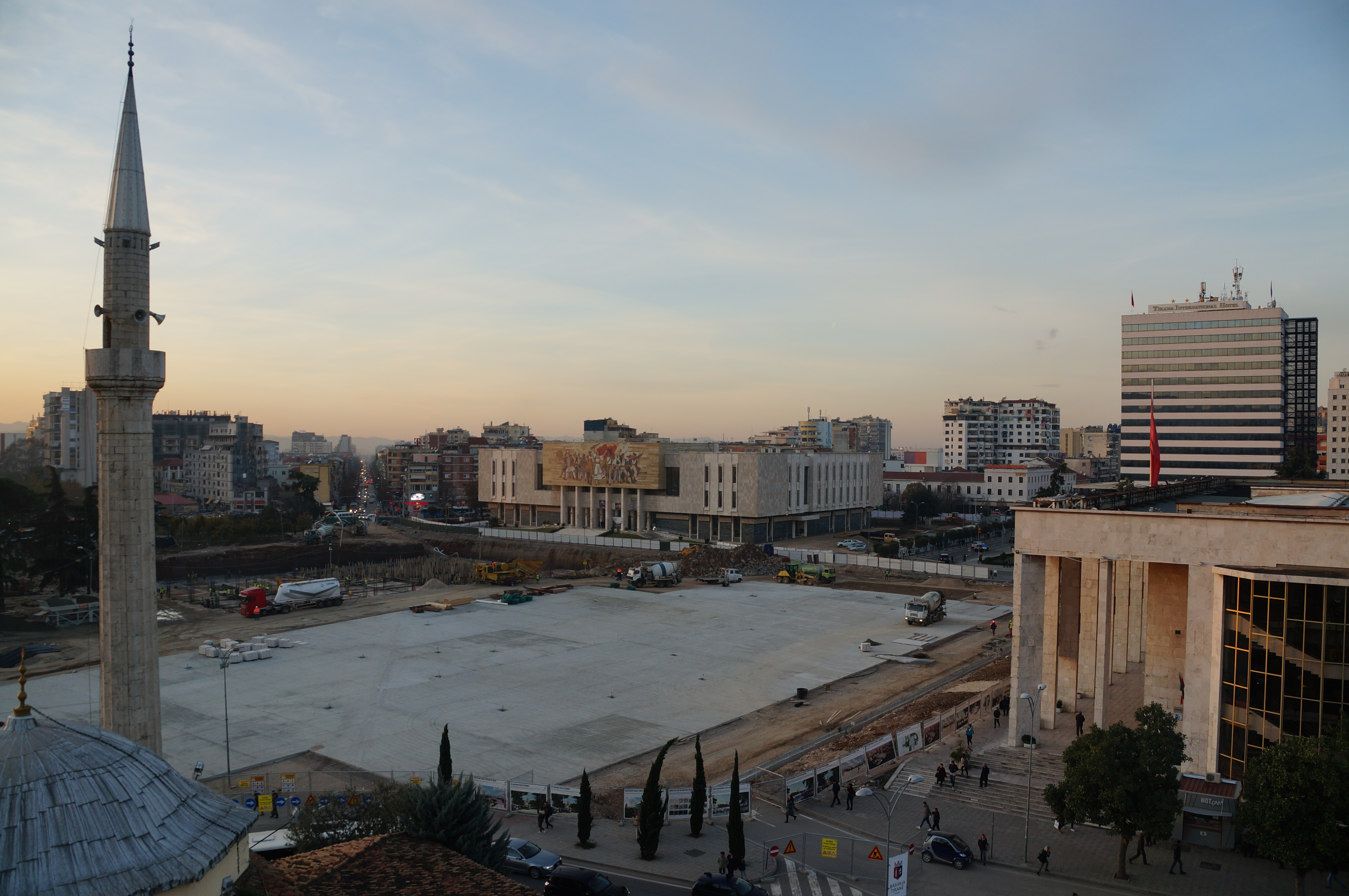
2016 construction works

The next mayor, Erion Veliaj, announced that instead the 2010 plan would be reintroduced with minor changes such as greater green space areas around the square, underground parking, and the introduction of stone material taken from all corners of Albania, and Albanian inhabited lands. Albania's rich flora would be represented in the gardens around the square, while the former garden behind Skanderbeg's monument would be restored to the pre-2010 state and named Europe Park.

Construction works started in 2016 with the finishing of the small ring road around the square. Once the project is completed, the square will serve as a venue where the surrounding institutions would showcase themselves in an open environment concept. The square will also serve as a local farmers market with vendors from rural Tirana showcasing their organic products. The square, designed by 51N4E and Anri Sala, was opened to the public in June 2017.

== Gallery ==
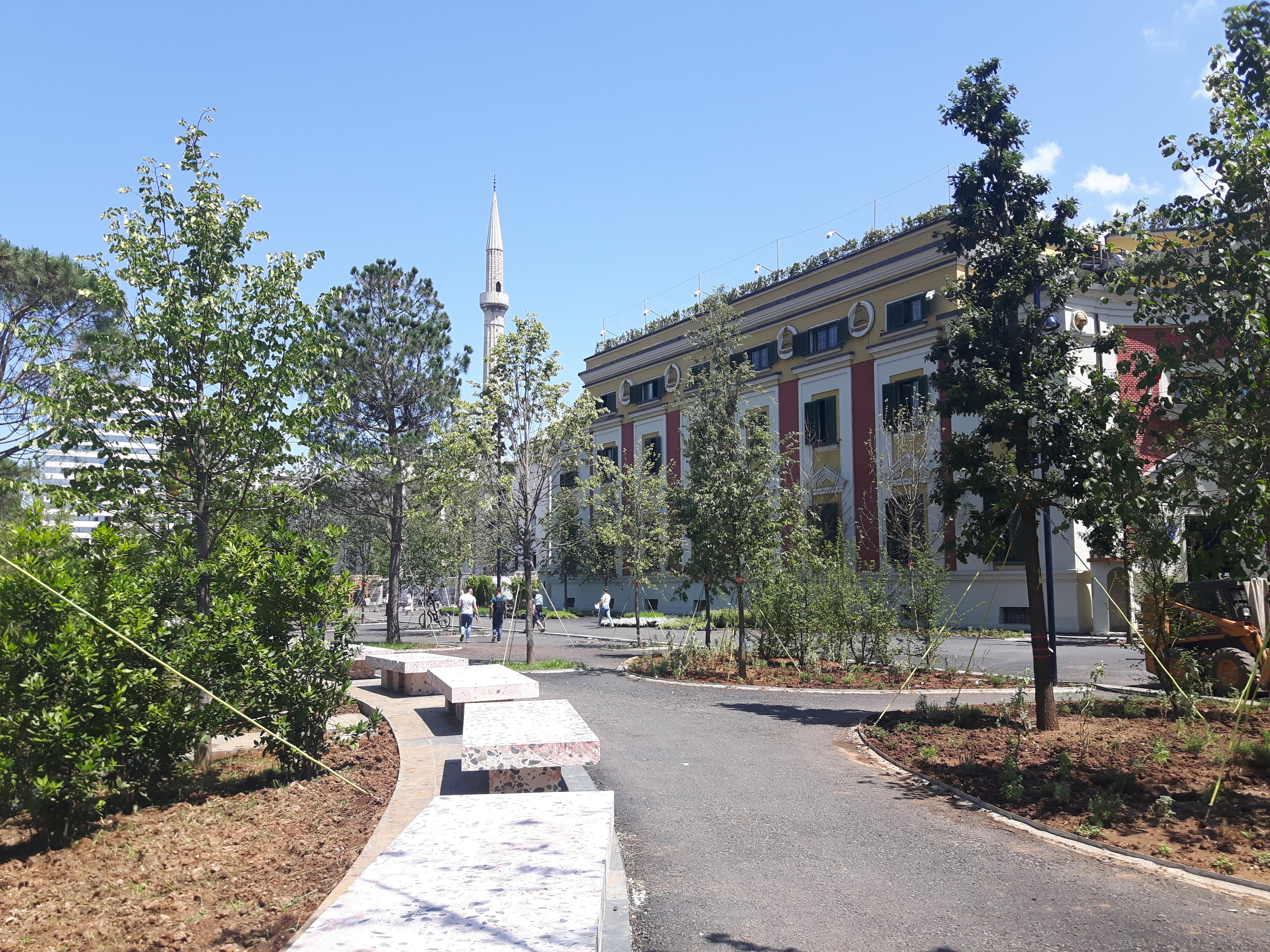
City Hall Building

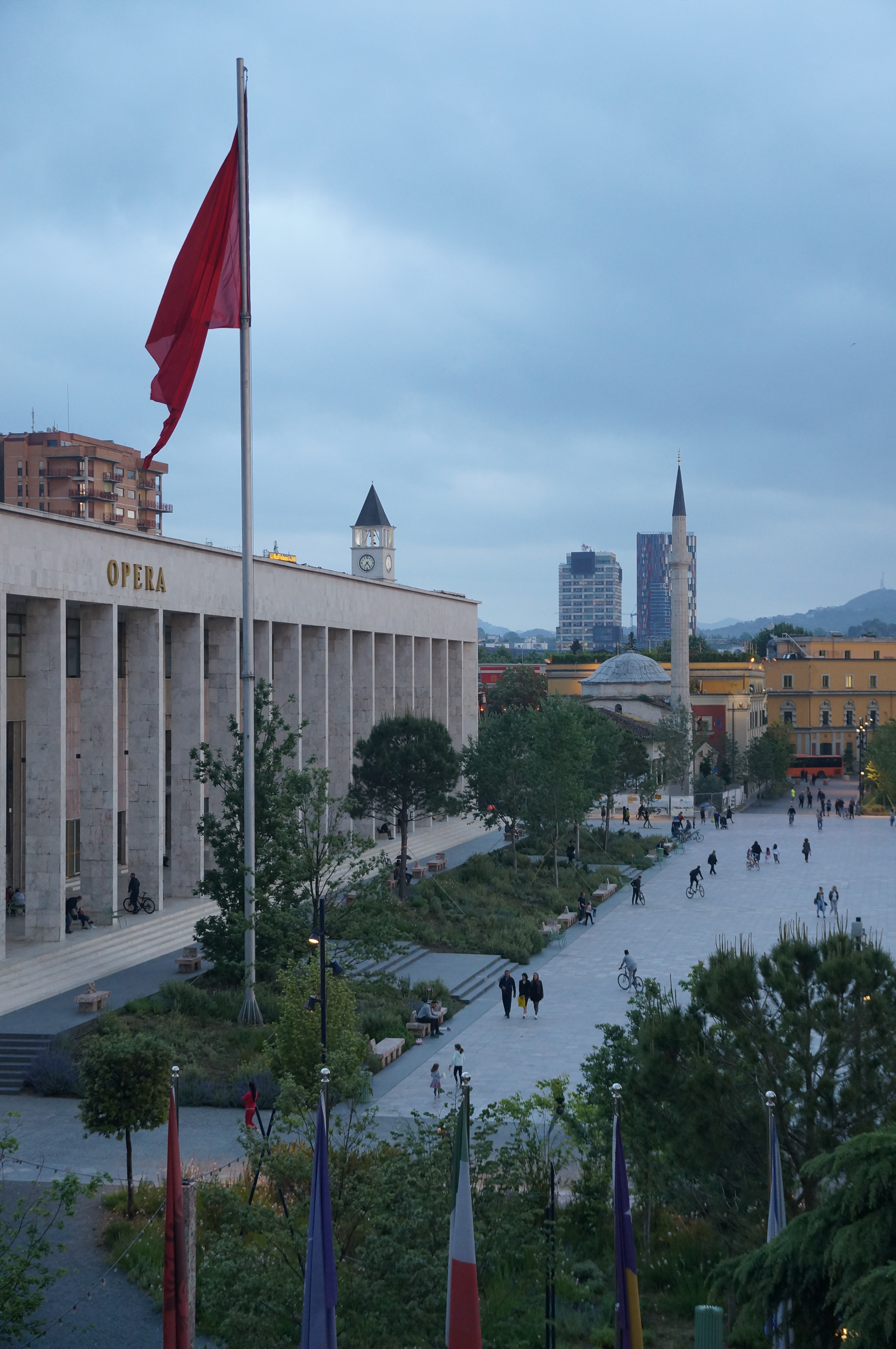
Palace of Culture

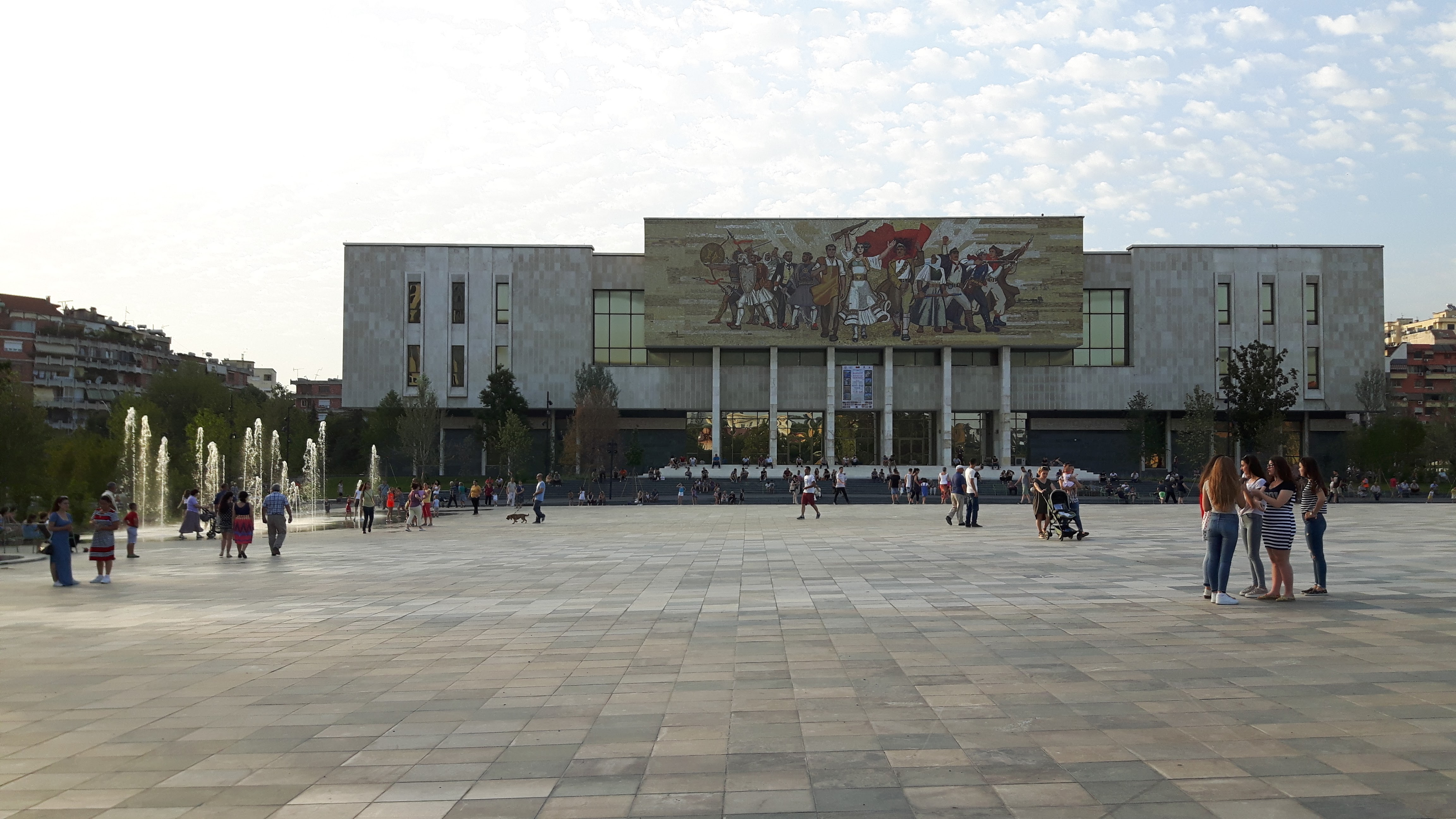
National History Museum

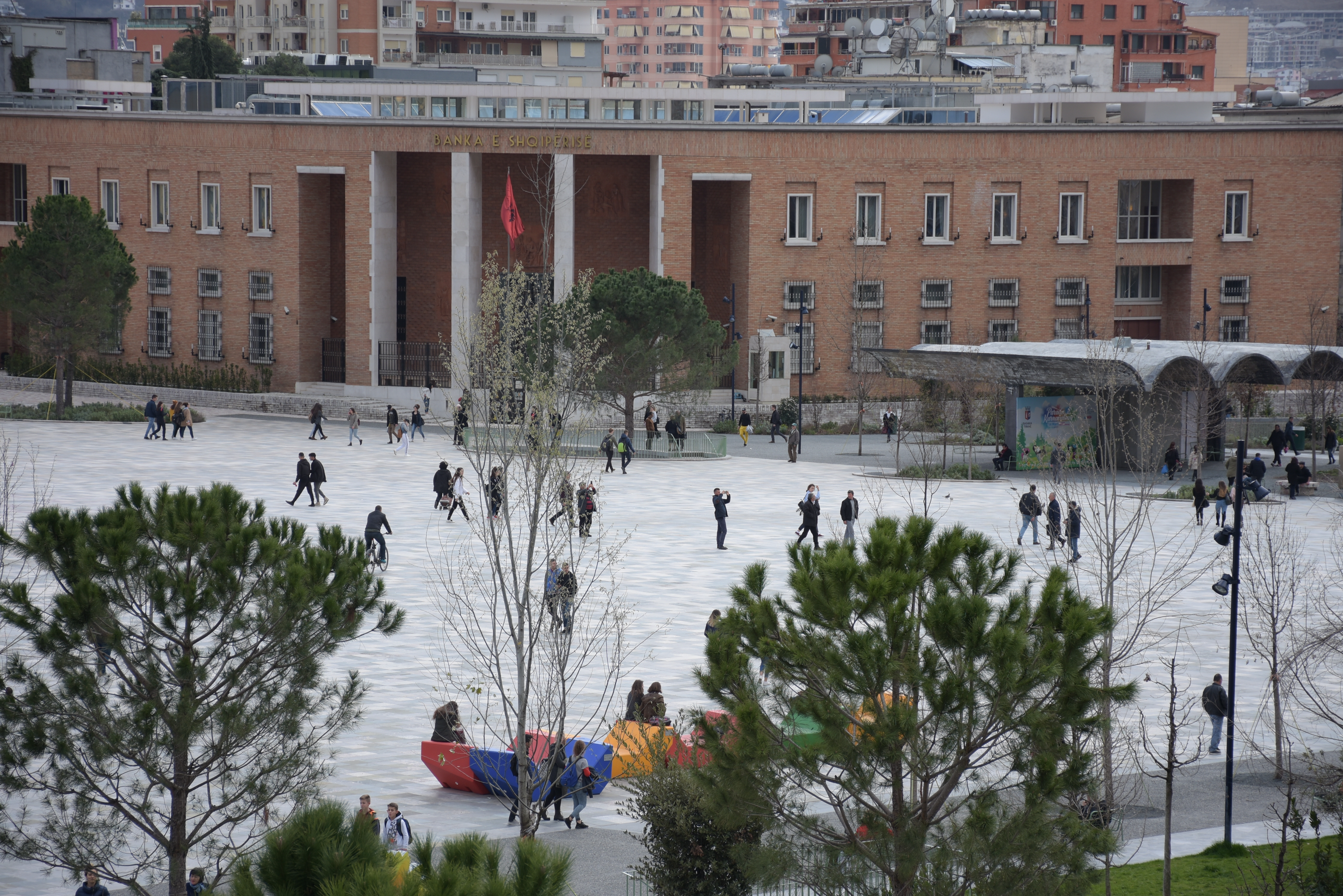
Bank of Albania

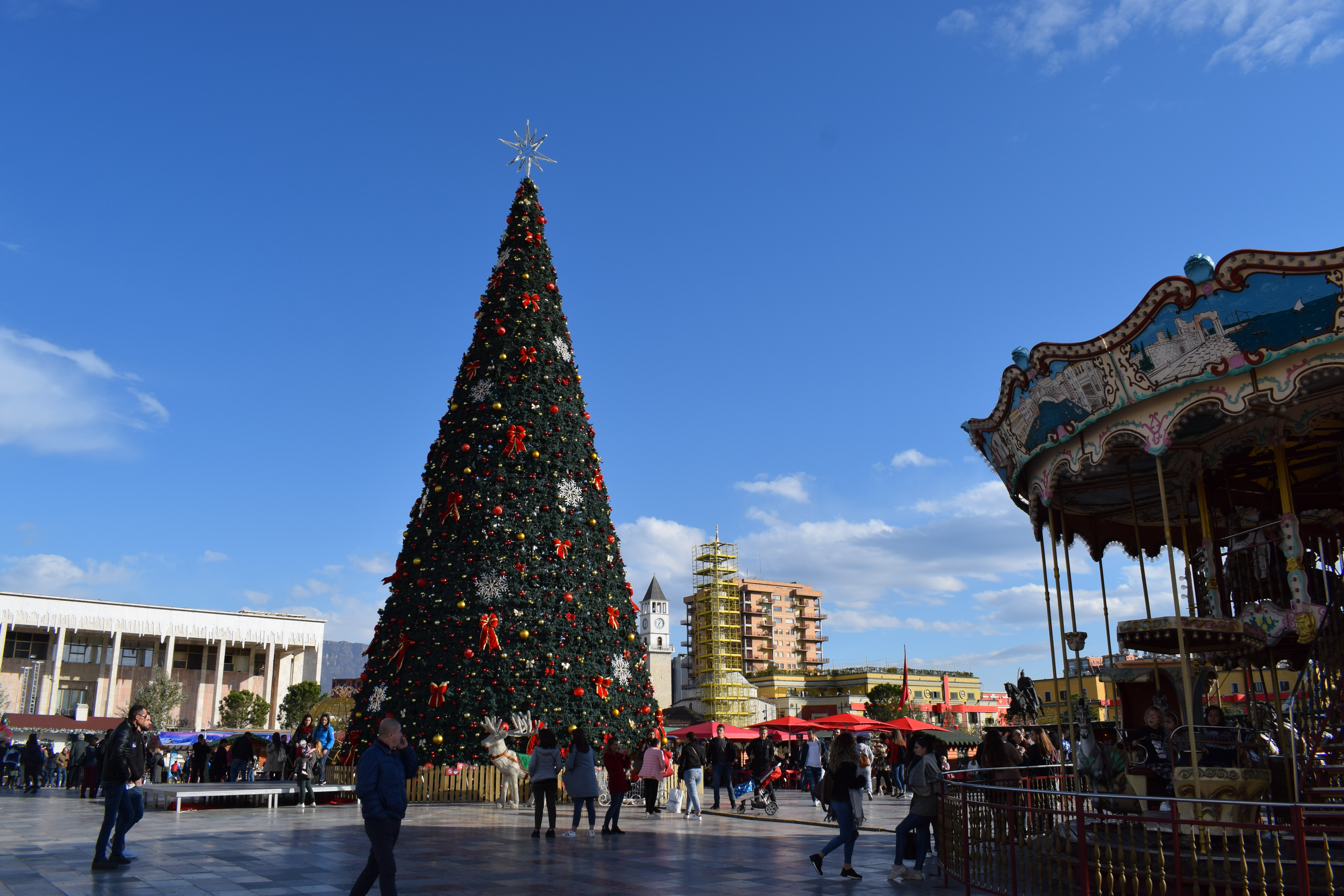
Christmas Tree on the square

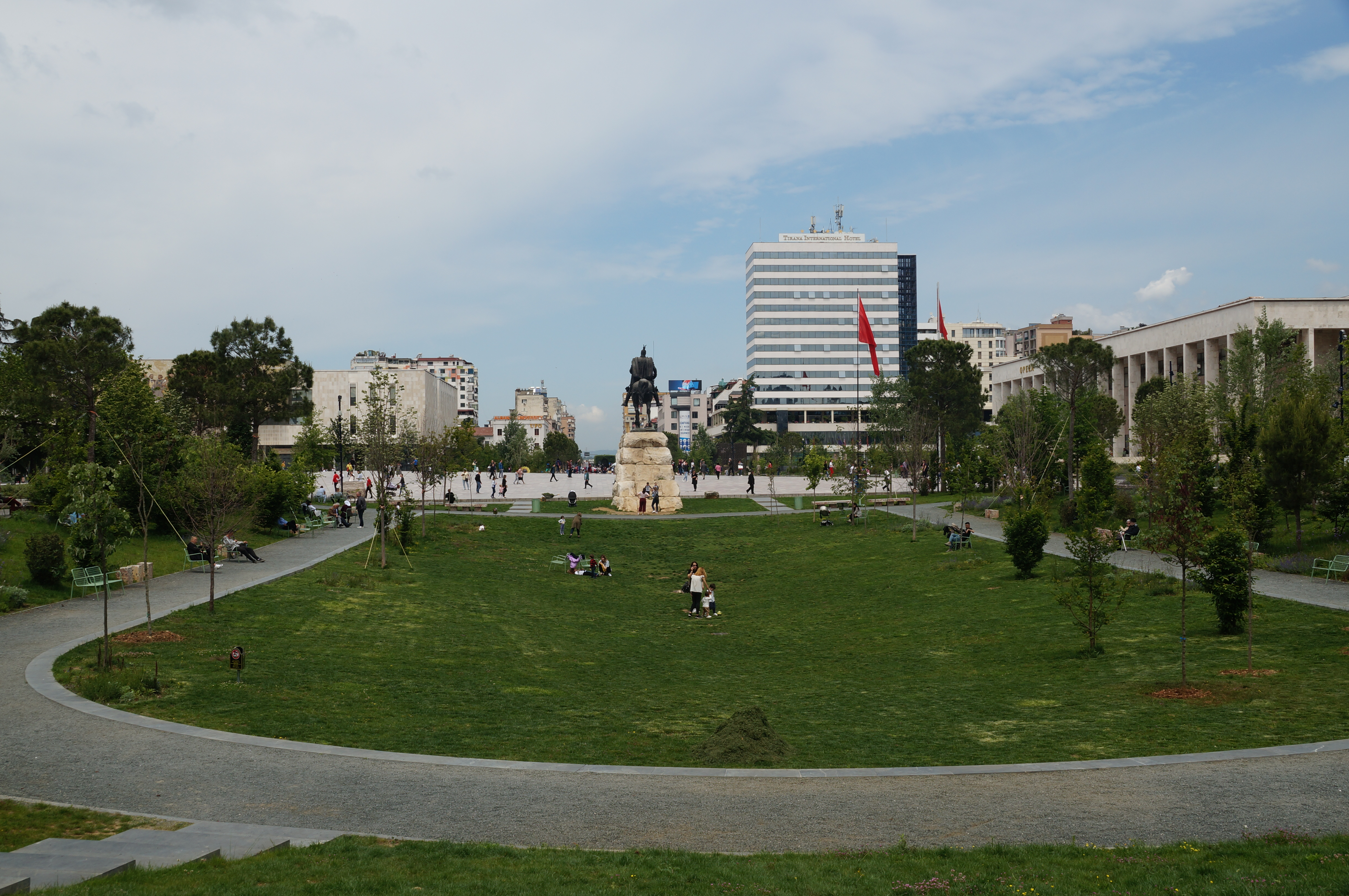
Europe Park

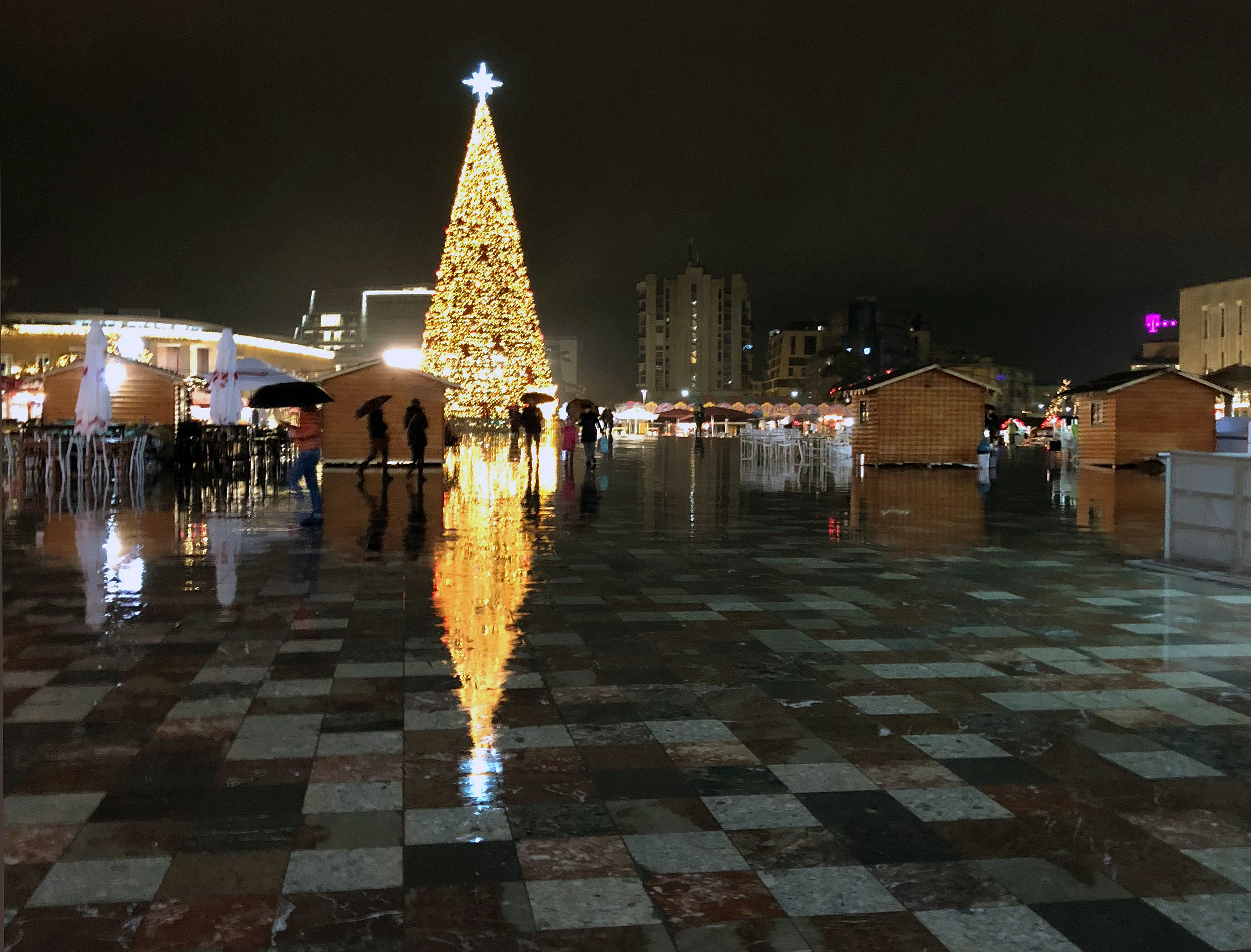
Christmas Tree on Skanderbeg Square Christmas Market during night time

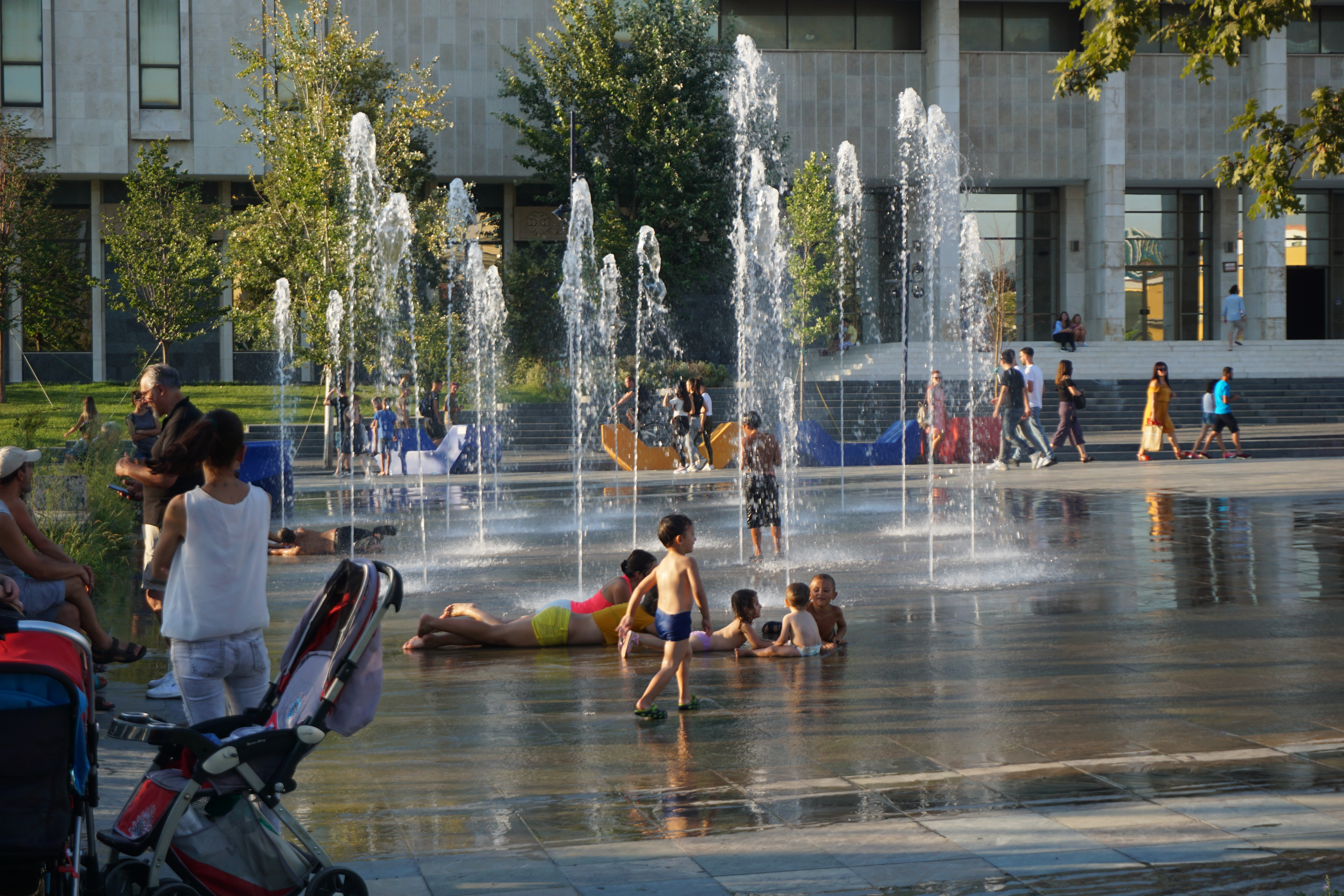
Water fountains

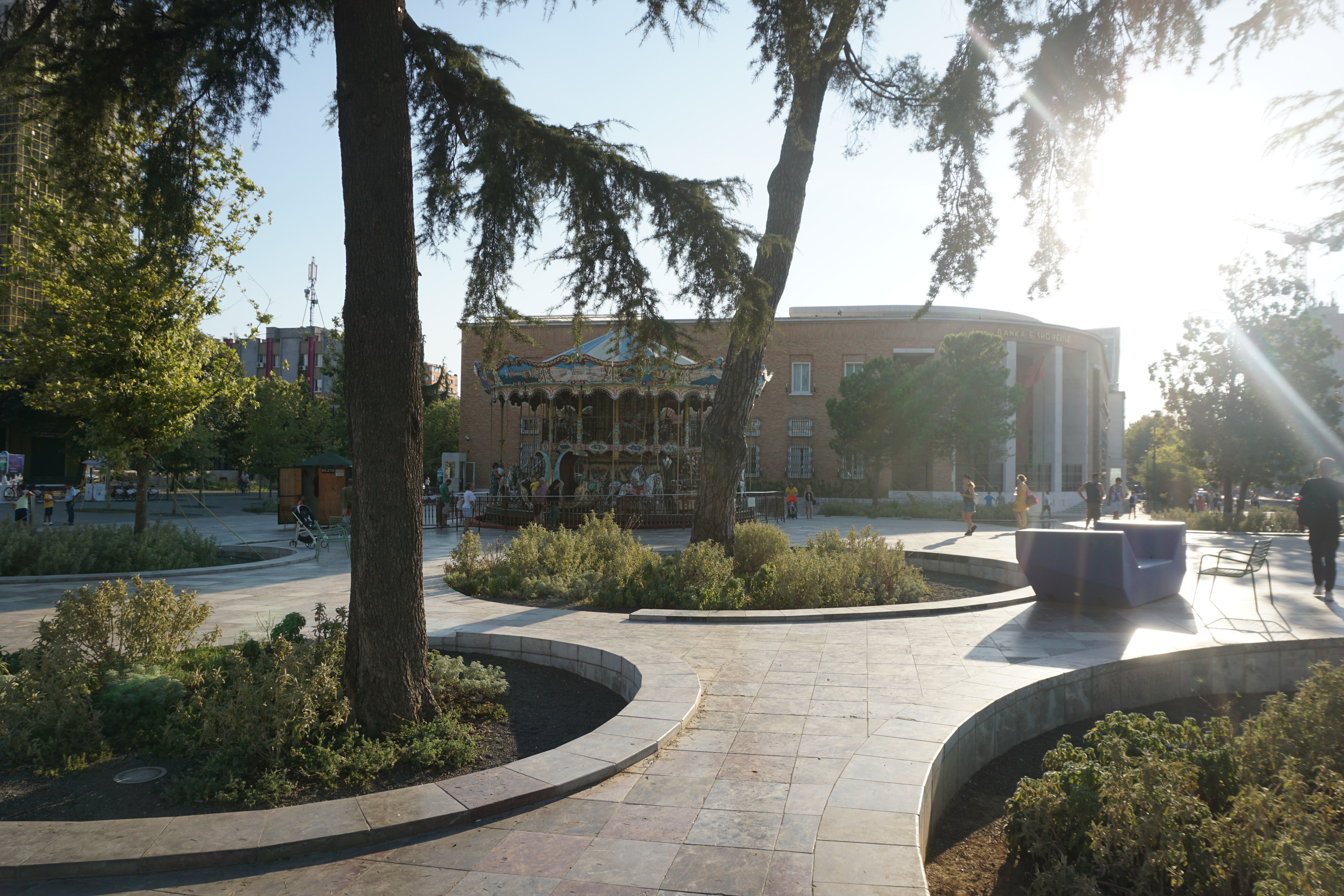
Mini park in the square

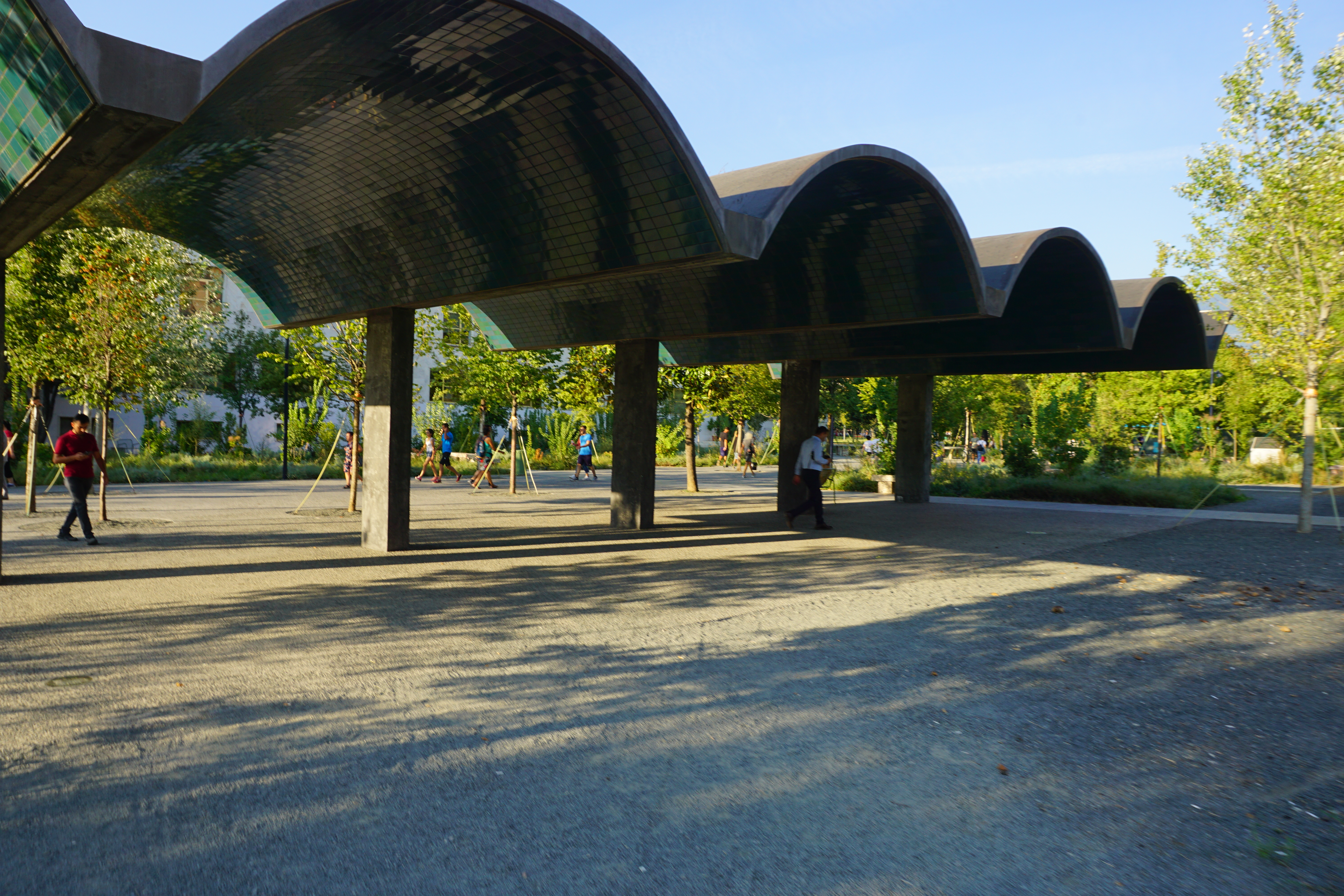
Structure near the underground parking

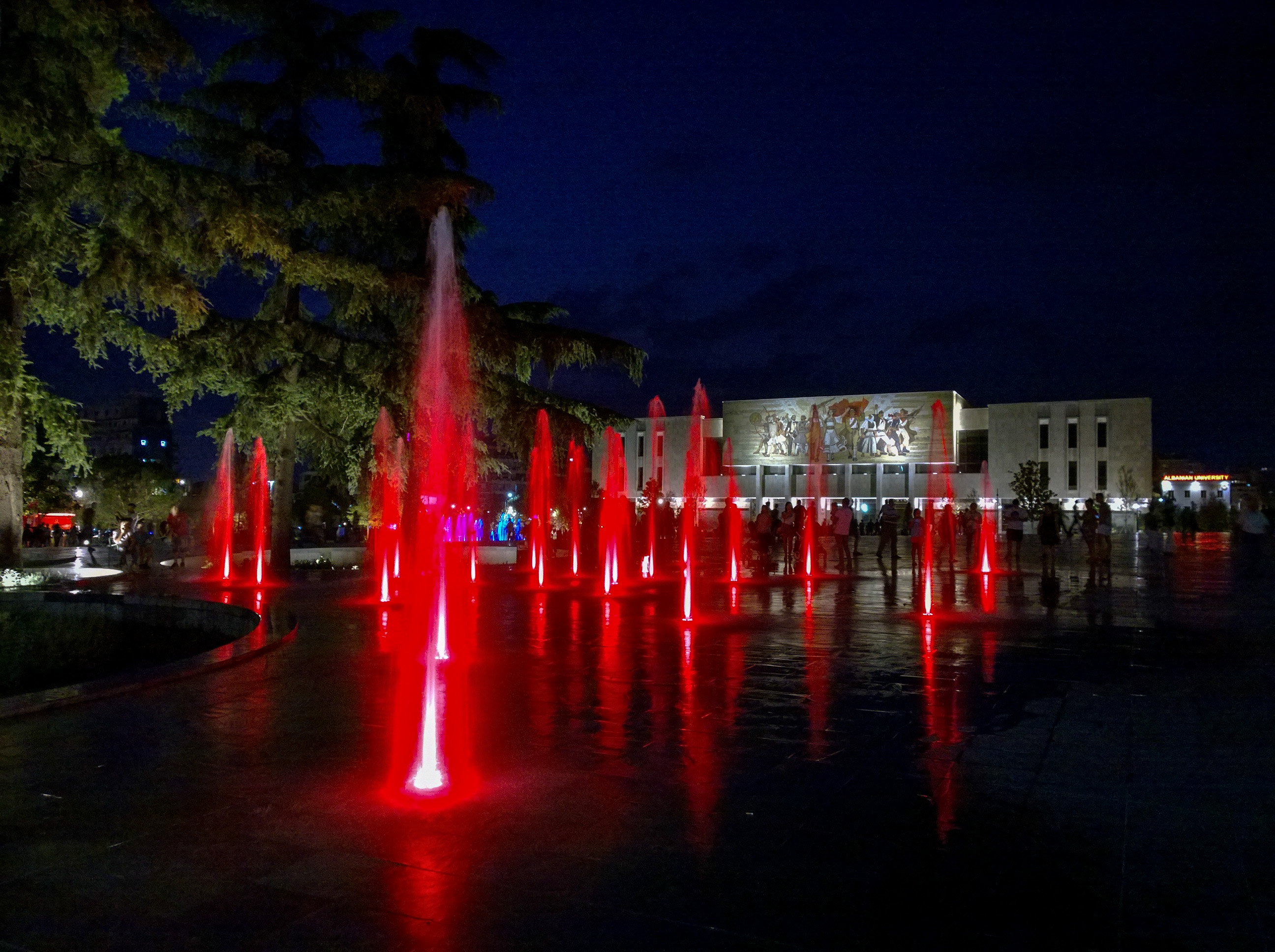
Colorful fountains at night

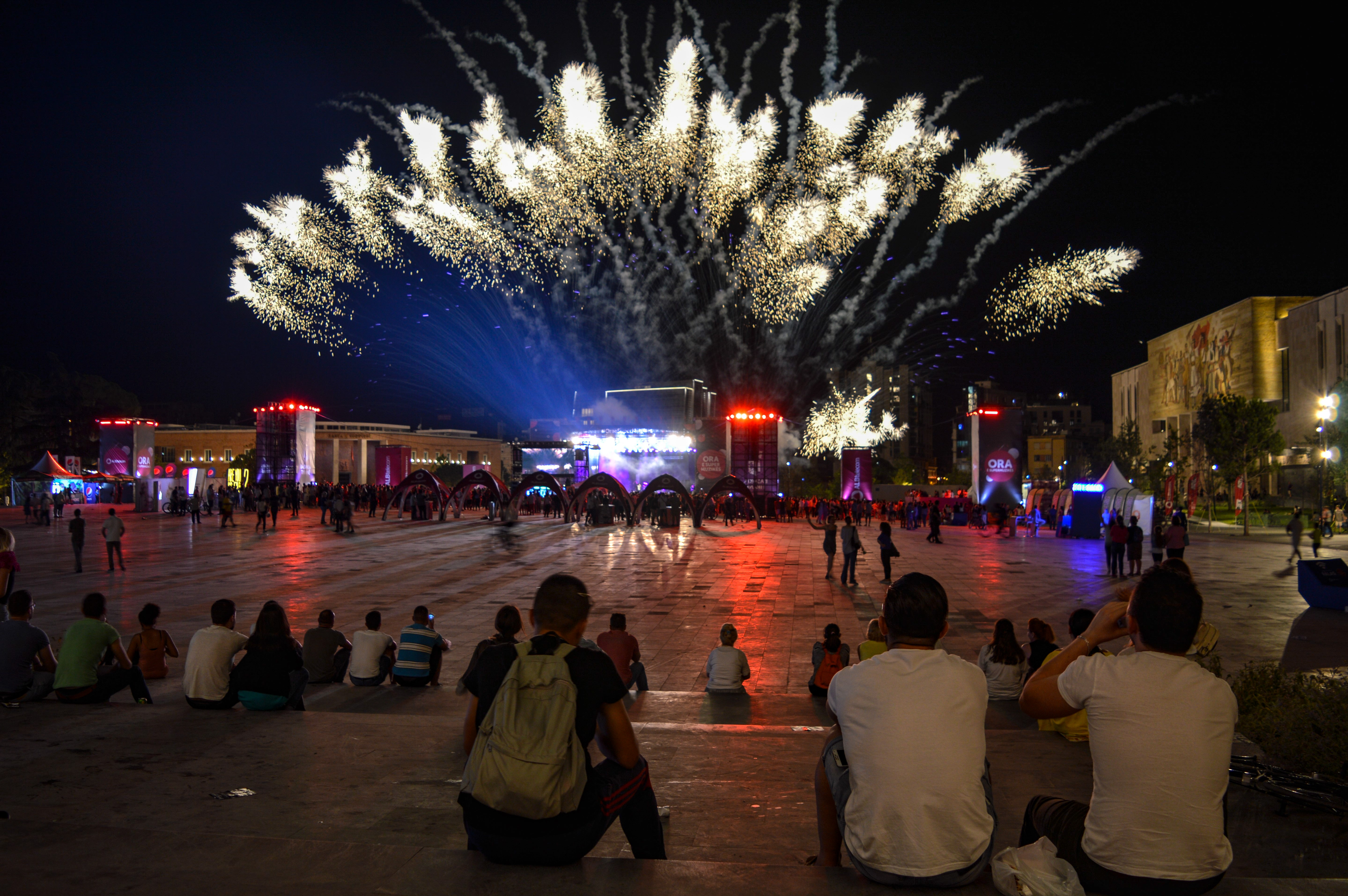
Music Concert of Ermal Meta

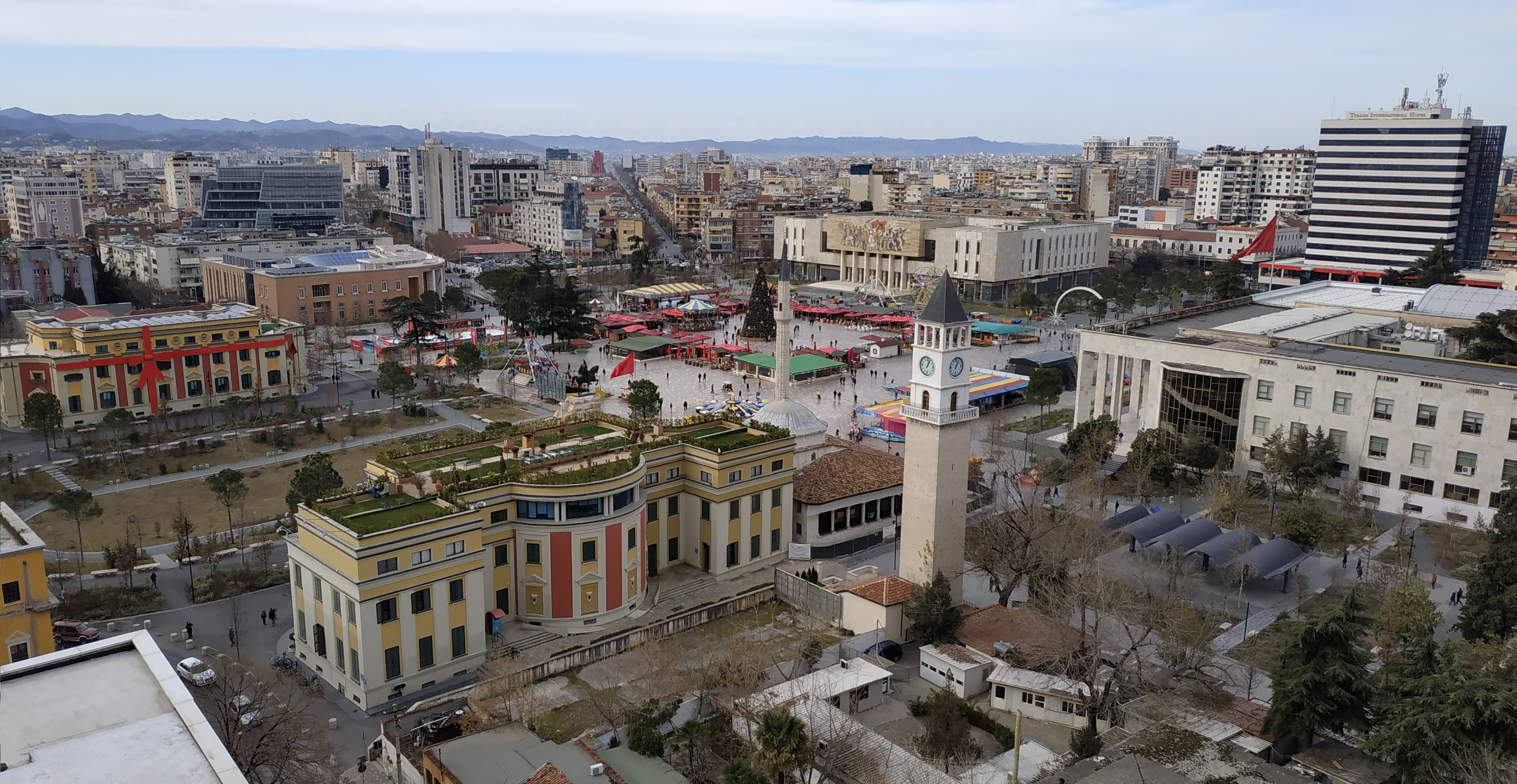
Christmas Market seen from above

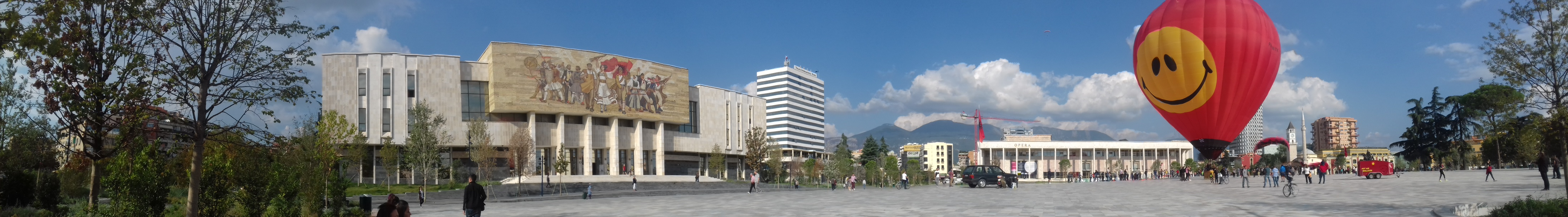
Skanderbeg Square under the Smile Albania tourism marketing campaign

== See also ==
- Dëshmorët e Kombit Boulevard
- Landmarks in Tirana
- Architecture of Albania
- Skanderbeg Square in Pristina, Kosovo
- Skanderbeg Square in Skopje, North Macedonia
