= Qemal Stafa Stadium =

Football stadium

Coordinates: 41°19′5.93″N 19°49′26.67″E

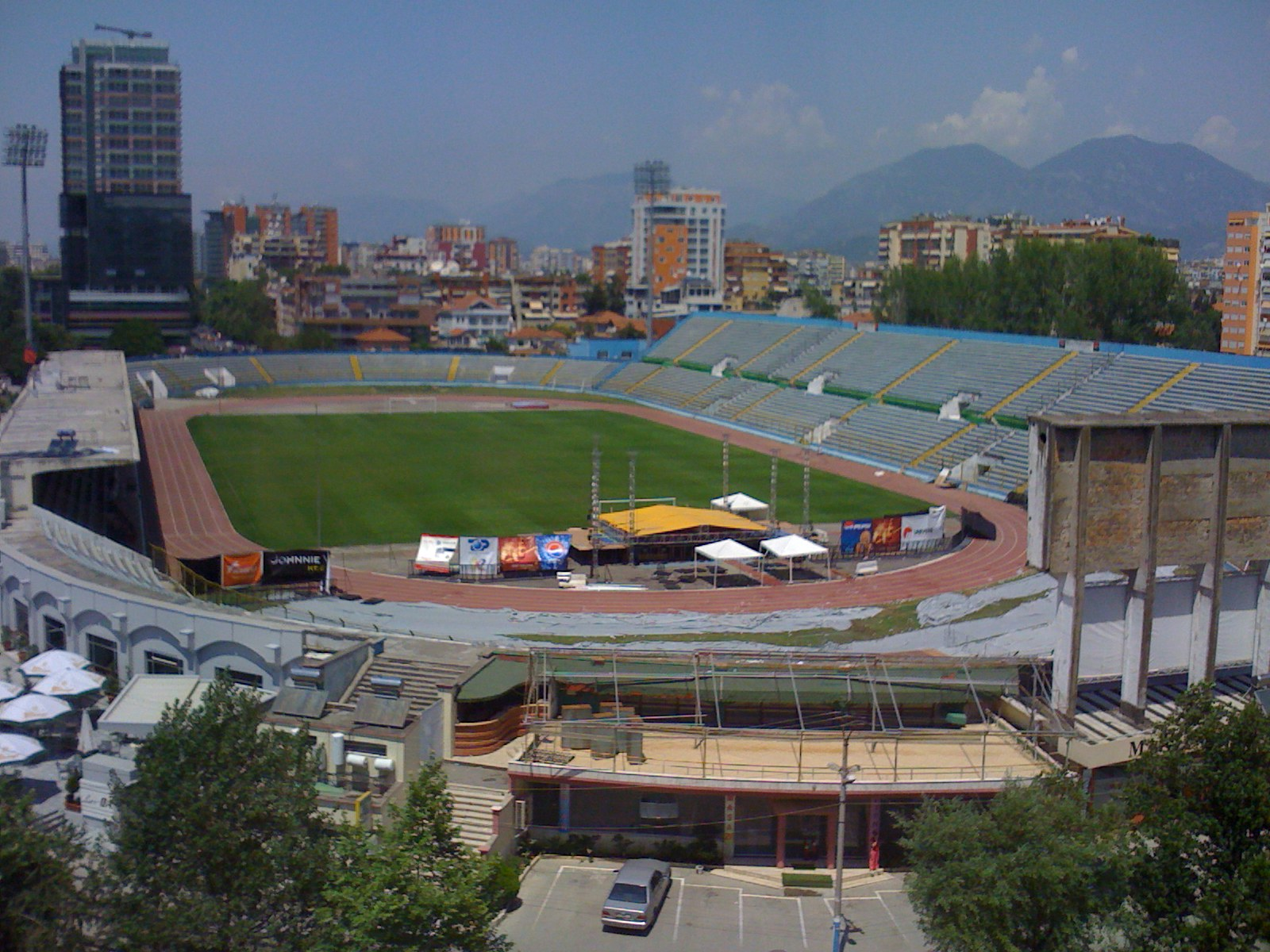
- View of the Old Arena Kombëtare
- Interactive map of Qemal Stafa Stadium
- Location: Sheshi Italia 1, 1010; Tirana, Albania
- Owner: Football Association of Albania
- Operator: Football Association of Albania
- Capacity: 16,230

Construction
- Groundbreaking: August 1939
- Opened: 7 October 1946
- Closed: 20 May 2016
- Demolished: June 2016

Tenants
- Dinamo Tirana (1946–2016); KF Partizani Tirana (1946–2016); Albania national football team (1946–2015)

The Qemal Stafa Stadium (Albanian: Stadiumi Qemal Stafa), named after Qemal Stafa (1920–1942), a World War II hero, was a national stadium and the largest football stadium in Tirana, Albania. Construction started in 1939 and the stadium was inaugurated in 1946 for the Balkan Cup, which was won by the Albania national football team. The stadium has been used for football matches of the Albanian Superliga and the national team, athletic events, and the six Albanian Spartakiads. Although it was enlarged in 1974 to accommodate up to 30,549 spectators, in the 1990s it became an all-seater stadium, and its capacity was reduced to 19,700.

The stadium was demolished in June 2016 to make way for the new national stadium called the Arena Kombëtare, was constructed on the same site and opened in November 2019. The Football Association of Albania and the Albanian government divide the property rights of the stadium between them; the football association holds 75% rights and the government 25%. National Arena, with a capacity of over 22,500 spectators built at a cost of €60 million. The new stadium is football-only; the athletics track was removed. It meets the highest UEFA category.

== History ==
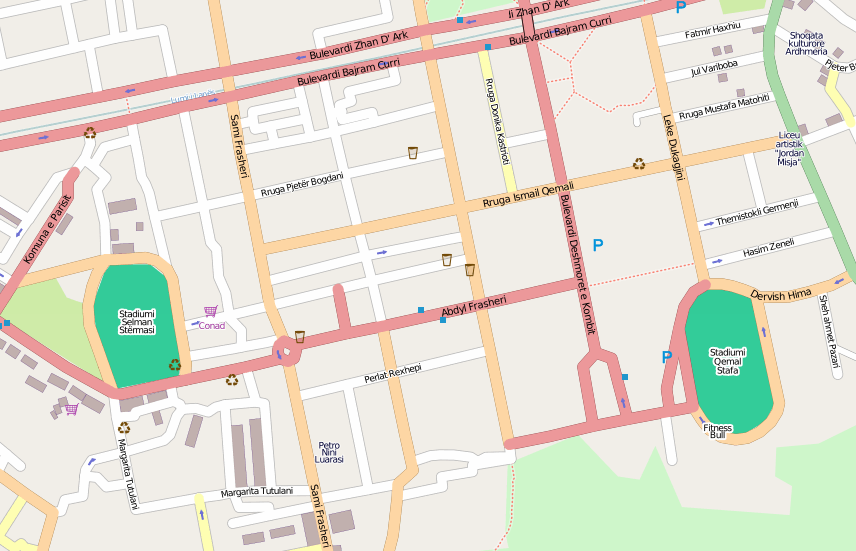
A map of Qemal Stafa Stadium in relation to Selman Stërmasi Stadium (left)

The original stadium was built in an Olympic Stadium shape, as idealized by Gherardo Bosio, a young fascist architect from Florence, Italy. Its planned capacity was 15,000; Tirana at that time had less than 60,000 inhabitants so the stadium would have been more than sufficient. The stadium was originally designed in an elliptical shape and was to have been completely clad in marble. Galeazzo Ciano symbolically placed the first stone in August 1939. Construction lasted four years; work was interrupted in 1943 after the Capitulation of Italy. During the German invasion of Albania the stadium was used by the occupying German forces to store vehicles and equipment. After World War II, 400 workers and 150 daily volunteers finished construction of the stadium. The planned marble cladding was only installed on one stand.

The stadium was named after Qemal Stafa, a Hero of Albania in World War II. The inauguration occurred when the Albania national football team played in the stadium for the first time on 7 October 1946, when the Balkan Cup was organised. The Cup was won by Albania; they overcame teams like Yugoslavia, Bulgaria, and Romania in that competition. Afterwards the stadium was used for the Albanian Superliga matches, athletics events, and the six Albanian Spartakiads.

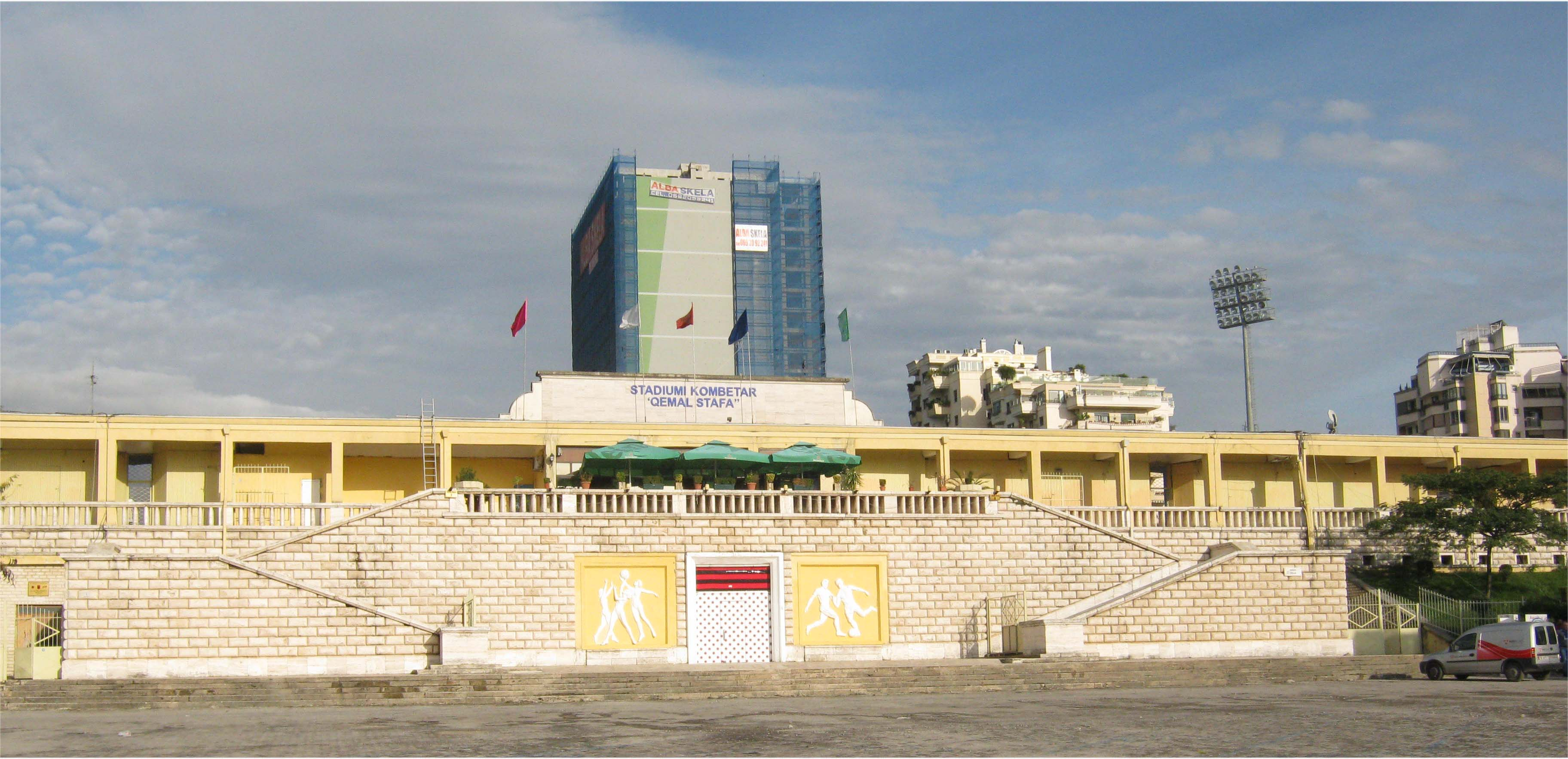
View on the stadium from Italy square

The second football stadium in Tirana, the Selman Stërmasi stadium, was built in 1959 but by the late 1960s and early 1970s, the stadium's capacity was still not sufficient to meet the growing needs of the Albanian Superliga. The Qemal Stafa stadium was thus enhanced for the 30th anniversary of the Liberation of Albania in 1974. One of the stands was extended from 10 to 28 rows, taking the capacity of the stadium to 35,000 (no seats were installed at that time). An electronic display purchased in Hungary was also added. The enlargement of the stadium was celebrated in November 1974, on the occasion of the Third National Spartakiad.

After 1991, other modernization projects took place, including the installation of seats which reduced the capacity to today's 19,700. In 1996, Qemal Stafa had illumination for evening sports event for the first time, with the funding being a gift from UEFA. In 2008, the stadium was revamped with new areas for anti-doping procedures and internet rooms were added for journalists.

The stadium is used by the Albania national football team and for the home games of Tirana-based Albanian football clubs: KF Tirana, Partizani, and Dinamo.

== Recent issues ==
The tribune scheme

=== Plans for demolition and reconstruction ===
In June 2010, the Albanian government put the stadium on a list of assets for sale. During the summer of 2010, there was a disagreement between the Albanian Football Association (FSHF) and the Albanian government as to the disposition of the stadium. FSHF, sponsored by UEFA, proposed that the stadium, rather than being sold, should be totally donated by the government to FSHF, under the condition that the stadium receive UEFA funding for its reconstruction. On 8 October 2010, Albania's Prime Minister Sali Berisha declared that for the 100th anniversary of the Albanian Declaration of Independence, which will occur in 2012, a new national stadium will be built in Tirana.

The new stadium, already approved by the Albanian Football Association and the government, will replace the existing one which will be demolished. The number of seats is expected to be more than 22,500. The total construction cost will be around € 60 million, and 75% of the property rights of the stadium will belong to the Albanian Football Association, and the remaining 25% to the Albanian government. Once finished, the stadium is expected to be of category four, the highest UEFA category, and will potentially be able to host Champion League final matches. The demolition of the old stadium started in June 2016.

=== Renaming ===
In January 2010, after the death of the notable Albanian player Panajot Pano, an official request from the Partizani Tirana club and from the Albanian Minister of Culture, Youth and Sports was addressed to the Albanian government for the stadium to be renamed after the famous footballer.

== The Qemal Stafa "Curse" ==
During the early 2000s, the stadium was considered a "curse" for other national teams by the Albanian media, partly due to the fact that Albania rarely lost their home games. In a period from September 2001 to October 2004, Albania went undefeated at this ground. Illustrious national teams such as Greece, who had just won Euro 2004, were eclipsed by Albania in 2004, whereas teams like Sweden, the Republic of Ireland, Switzerland, and Bulgaria had to settle for hotly contested draws in an intimidating arena.

Before this period, during 1986 World Cup qualifying round, future semi-finalist Belgium lost 2-0 at Qemal Stafa.
