= Hotel Dajti =

Hotel in Tirana, Albania

- Interactive map of the Hotel Dajti area

General information
- Location: Tirana, Albania
- Coordinates: 41°19′28″N 19°49′12″E
- Owner: Bank of Albania

Hotel Dajti was a hotel near Rinia Park on Dëshmorët e Kombit Boulevard in central Tirana, Albania. Carrying the name of nearby Dajti Mountain, it was the primary center for international visitors and diplomats during Albania's socialist period; the guest rooms were bugged with microphones, and there was a sub-basement floor for listening staff.

The hotel was built in the 1930s by the Italian architect Gherardo Bosio and the designer Gio Ponti. It was one of the first buildings constructed in the functionalist style in Albania. In 2002, it was listed as a protected cultural monument, and in 2009 it served as the venue for the Tirana International Contemporary Art Biennale.

In 2010, Hotel Dajti was purchased by the Bank of Albania for €30 million.

== Controversies ==
According to reports by various media outlets in Albania, the Bank of Albania allegedly printed additional currency to finance the purchase and renovation of the historic Hotel Dajti. This move has raised questions about the bank's financial practices and has sparked debate and concerns about financial transparency and government oversight.

== Namesakes ==
Several other establishments now carry the name "Dajti," such as the Dajti Park Hotel, 6 km outside the city.
