= Dëshmorët e Kombit Boulevard =

Street in Tirana, Albania

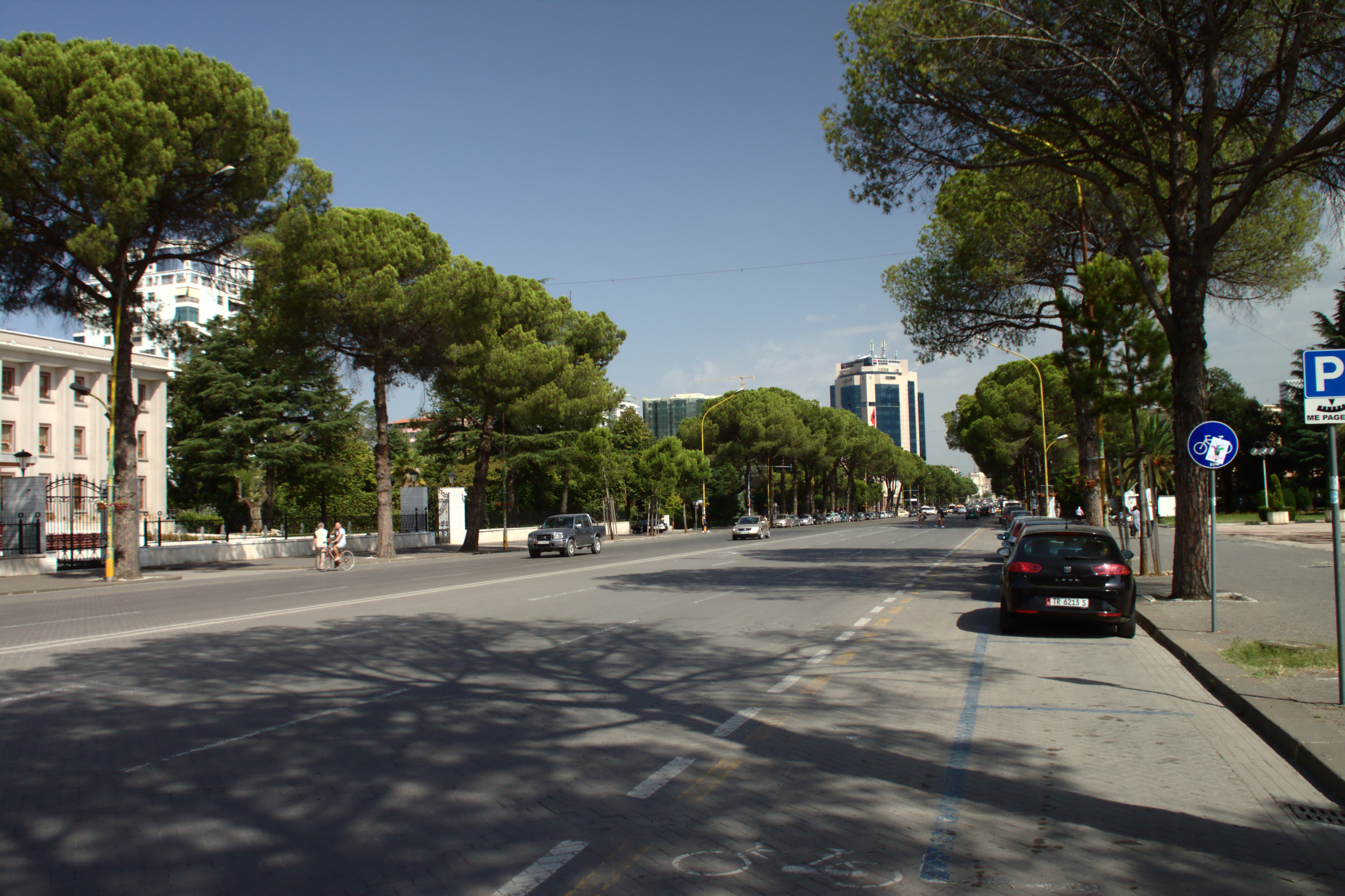
- View of the Boulevard looking northward.
- Interactive map of Dëshmorët e Kombit Boulevard
- Type: Public Boulevard
- Length: 1 km
- Location: Tirana Albania
- From: Skanderbeg Square
- To: Mother Teresa Square

Construction
- Construction start: 1939
- Completed: 1941

The Dëshmorët e Kombit Boulevard (English: Boulevard of the Martyrs of the Nation) is a major thoroughfare and is considered an important avenue in Tirana, Albania. It covers the distance from Skanderbeg Square to the Mother Teresa Square near the Polytechnic University of Tirana. It was initially designed by Armando Brasini in 1925. Brasini's master plan was later amended by Florestano di Fausto, and in 1939 by Gherardo Bosio following the Italian invasion of Albania.

The wide thoroughfare was initially named after King Zog, and after the 1939 invasion was renamed Viale del Impero ("Avenue of the [Italian] Empire"). In 1934 to 1935, a bridge was built over the boulevard by Gjovalin Gjadri. During the communist era in Albania, major parades regularly took place including on Liberation Day and International Workers' Day.

Many buildings are located along this boulevard, including the Presidential Palace, the Prime Minister's Office, the Palace of Congress, the Rogner Hotel and the University of Tirana. The boulevard enters the city centre from the south and intersects with Bajram Curri Boulevard near the Rinia Park, after passing the Lana. It then becomes part of Skanderbeg Square and continues north of the centre to Zogu I Boulevard.

Buildings, Facilities and Crossroads from North to South
Right side	Left side
Scanderbeg Square (North)
Ministries; Rruga Myslym Shyri; Rinia Park; Bulevard Gjergj Fishta; Lana; Bulevard Bajram Curri; Park with the busts of the Frashëri brothers; Twin Towers; Parliament; Rruga Ismail Qemali; Small park with Post-bllok monument; Rruga Abdyl Frasheri; Presidenca	Ministries; Rruga Murat Toptani; National Art Gallery; Hotel Dajti; Bulevard Zhan D'Ark; Lana; Bulevard Bajram Curri; Tirana Pyramid; Ministries; Rruga Ismail Qemali; Hotel Europapark; Rruga Asim Zeneli; Congress Palace
Mother Teresa Square (South)

During communism in Albania and in the 1990s, the boulevard served as an important social landmark where locals practiced the nightly stroll, also known as xhiro from Italian giro.

The boulevard was immortalised by Edi Hila in a series of paintings titled Martyrs of the Nation Boulevard.

== Gallery ==
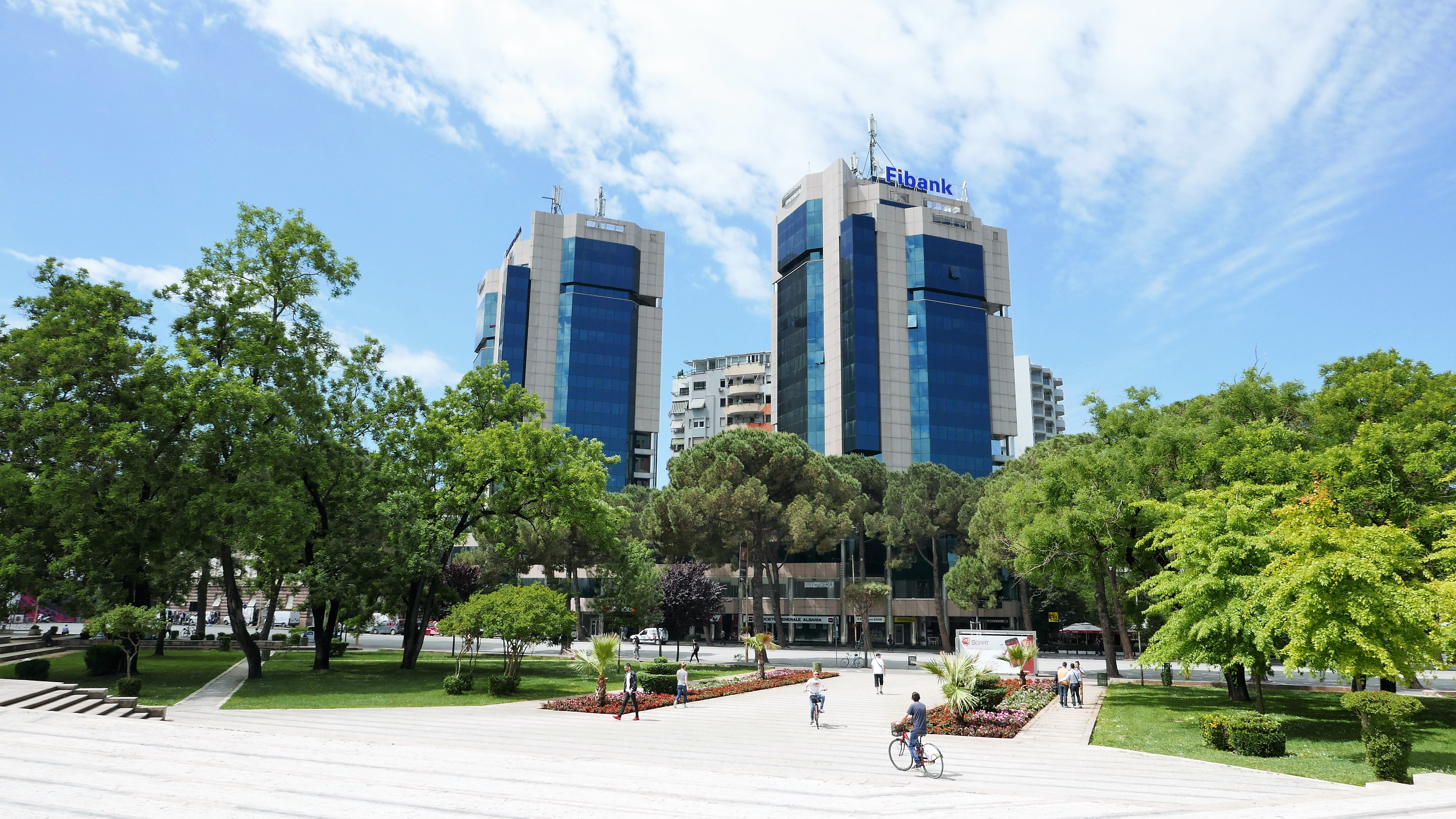
The view from the Pyramide

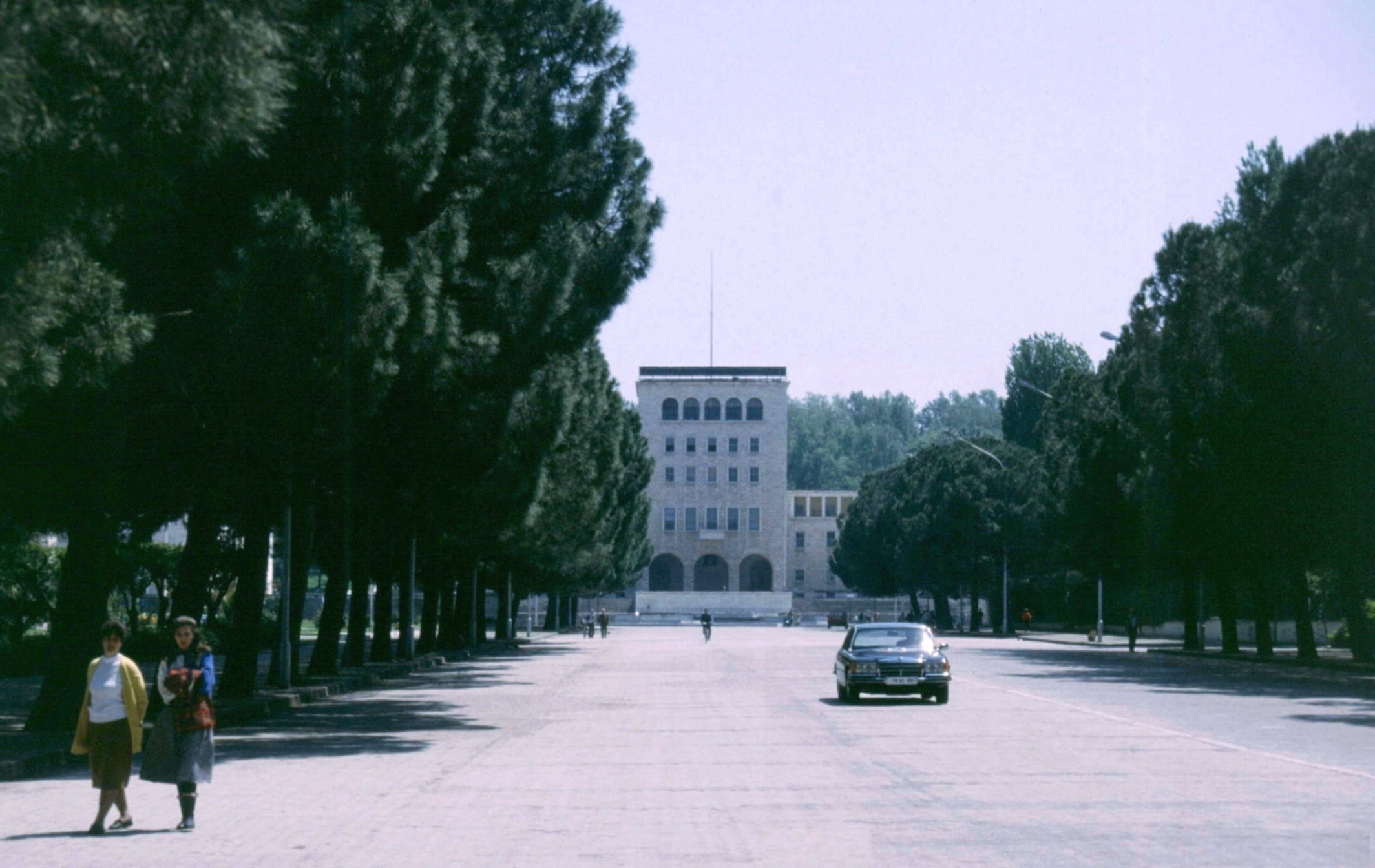
Old picture of Tirana's car-free main boulevard

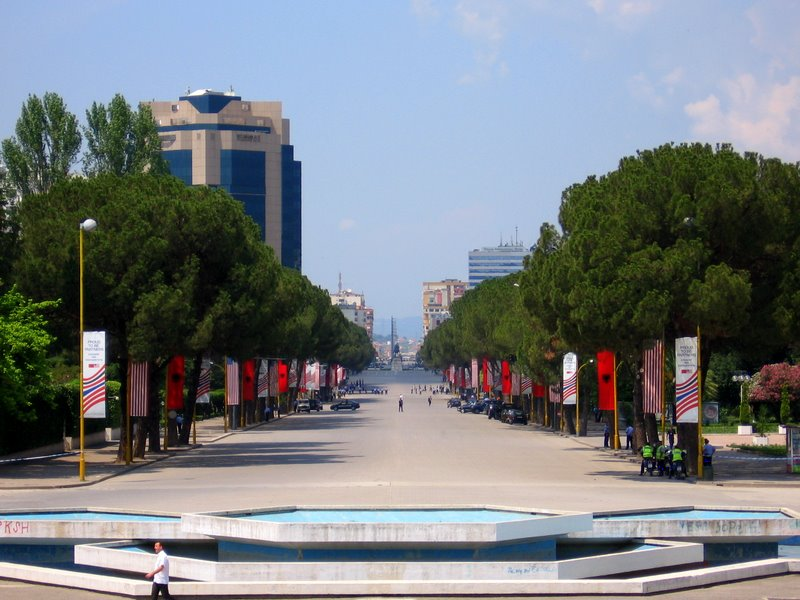
View from the south end of Mother Teresa Square

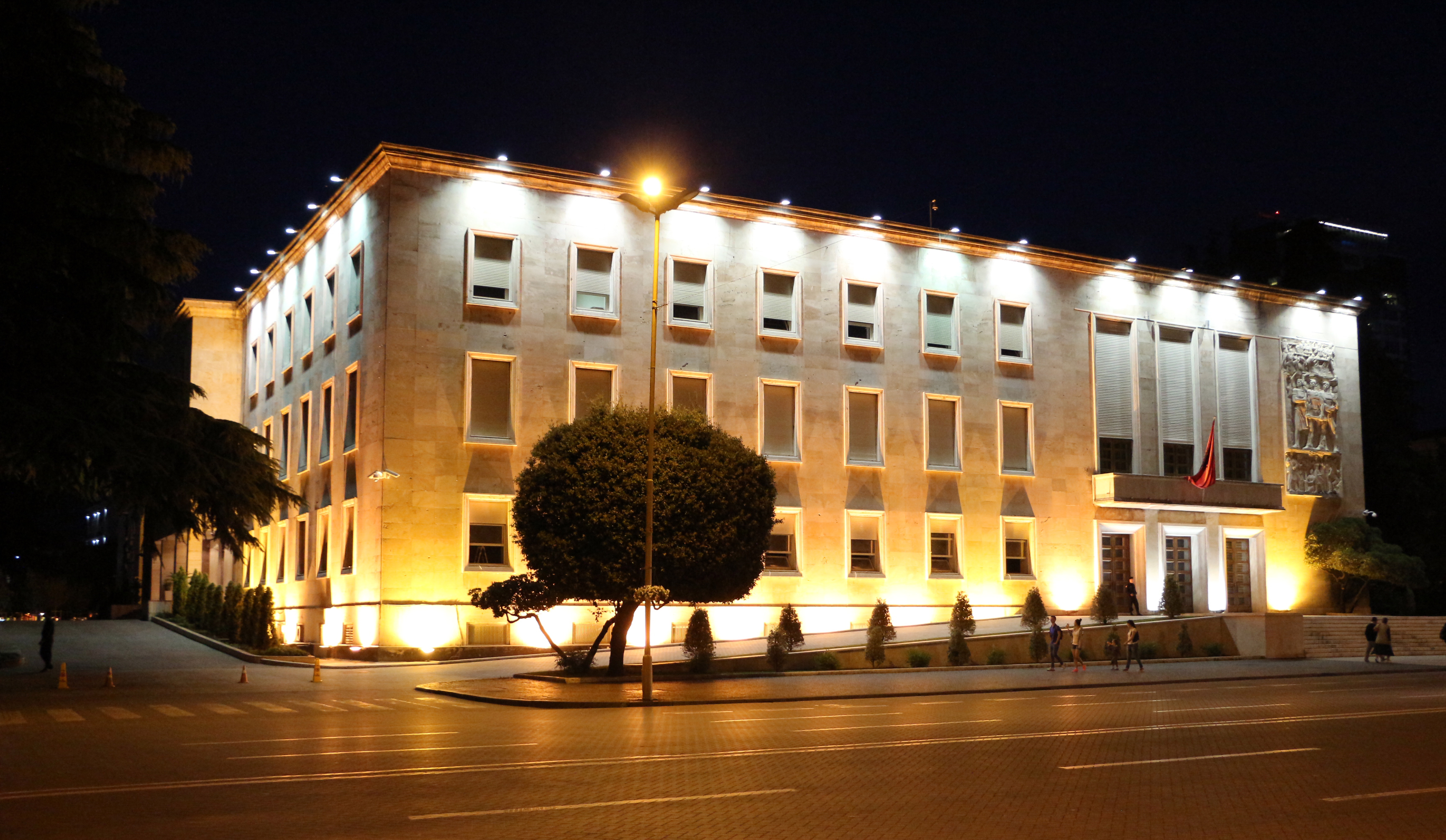
The Prime Minister's Office building

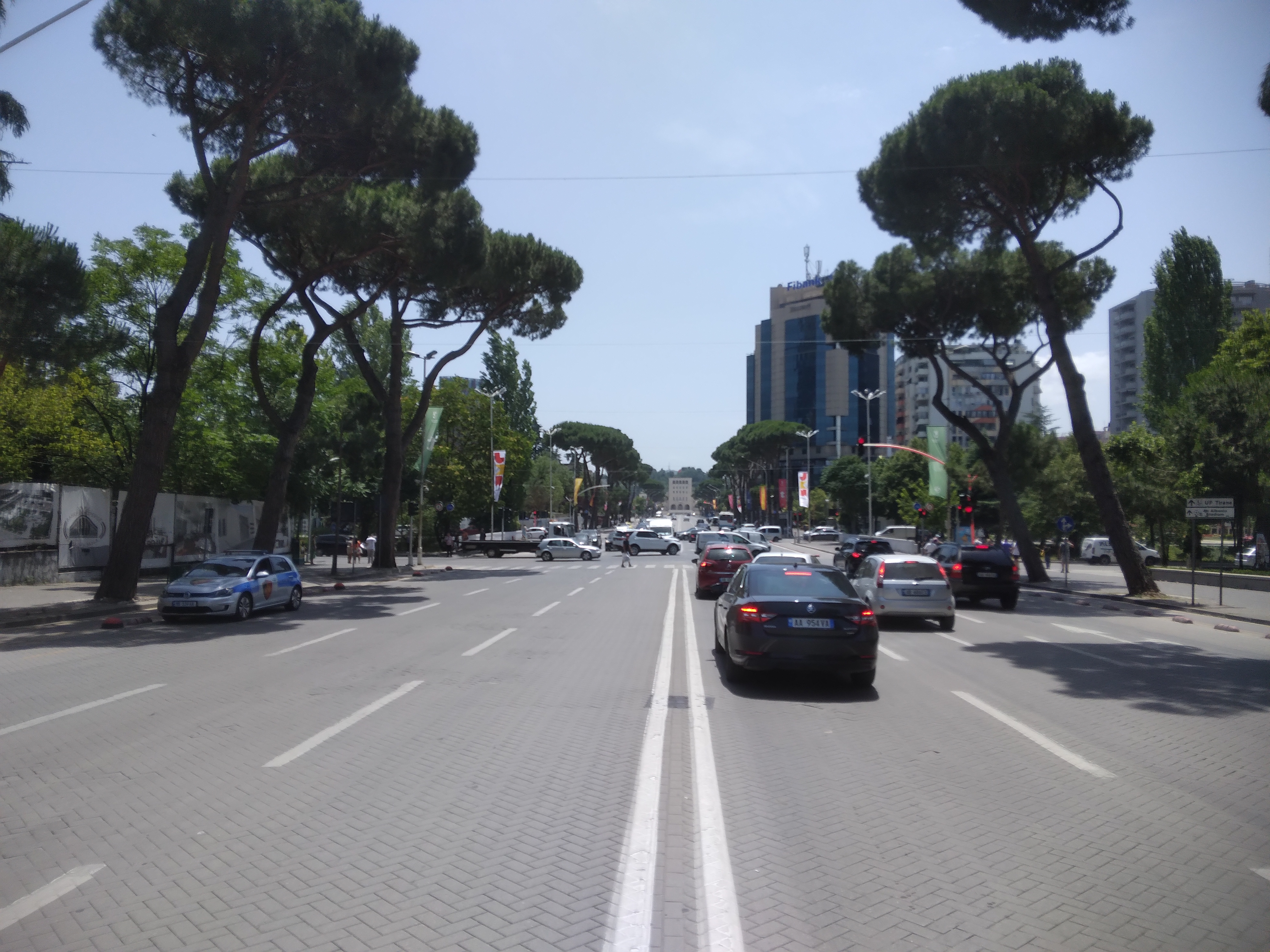
The street in 2022
