= Spartakiad (disambiguation) =

The Spartakiad (or Spartakiade) was an international sports event from 1928 to 1937.

Spartakiad may also refer to:

- Spartakiad of Peoples of the USSR, multi-event competitions in the Soviet Union from 1956 to 1991
- Spartakiad (Albania), multi-event competitions in Albania from 1959 to 1989
- Spartakiad (Czechoslovakia), mass gymnastics events in Czechoslovakia from 1955 to 1990
