= Mother Teresa Square (Tirana) =

Square in Tirana, Albania

- Public square
- {{{other_names}}}
- Sheshi Nënë Tereza
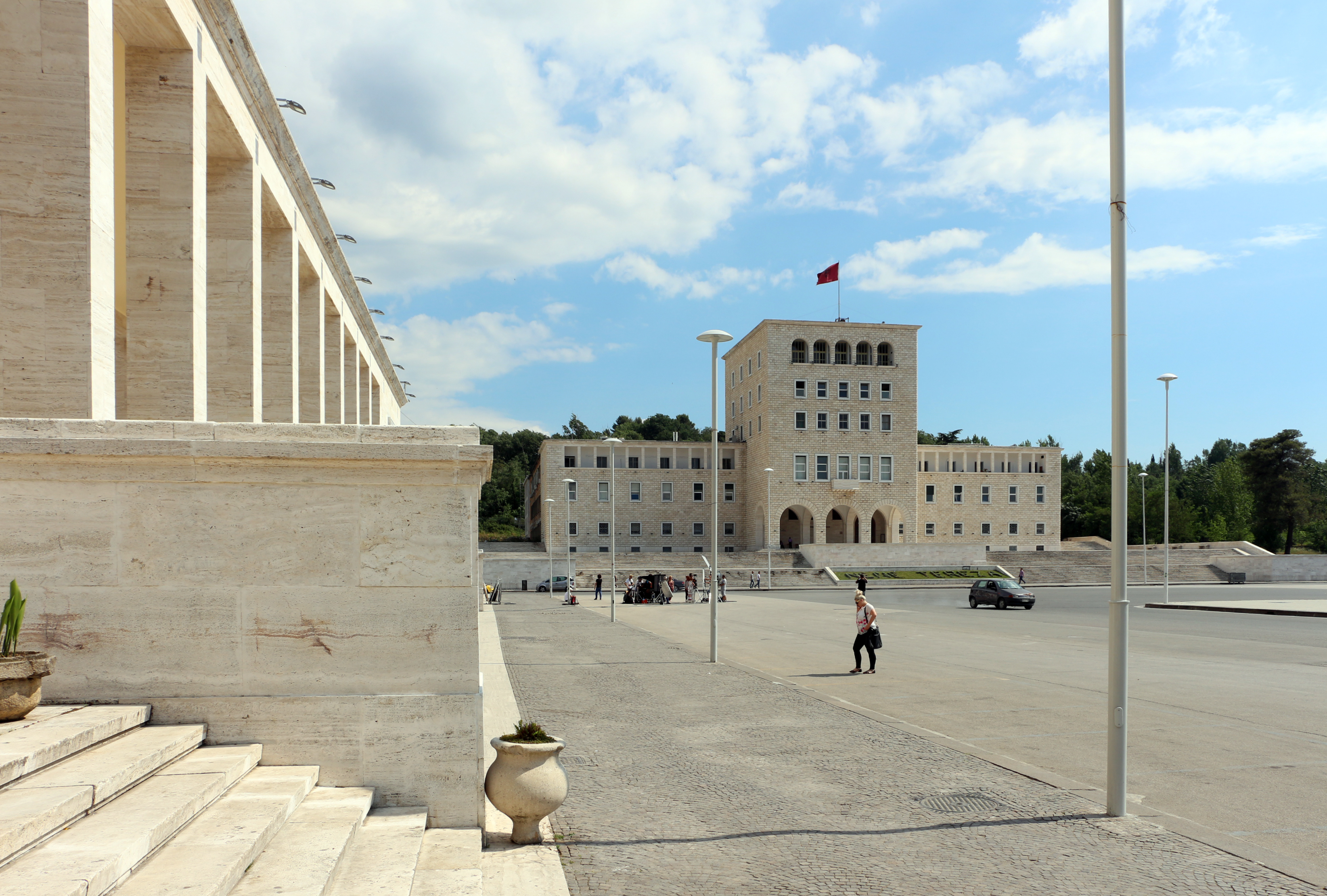
- Seen from the Archeological Museum
- Design: Gherardo Bosio
- Dedicated to: Mother Teresa
- Location: Tirana, Albania
- Interactive map of Mother Teresa Square
- Coordinates: 41.3179°N 19.8213°E

The Mother Teresa Square (Albanian: Sheshi Nënë Tereza) is the second largest square in Tirana, Albania. It is named after the Albanian-Indian Roman Catholic nun, missionary and Nobel Peace Prize laureate Mother Teresa.

The square was planned by the Italian architect Gherardo Bosio, and built together with the main Boulevard in 1939 to 1941, during the Italian occupation of Albania, in a Rationalist style. When the square was first constructed, it was named Victor Emmanuel III Square in honor of Victor Emmanuel III of Italy.

It is located on the south end of the Dëshmorët e Kombit Boulevard and important buildings are situated on this square. The buildings include the University of Tirana, the Polytechnic University, the University of Arts, the Archeological Museum and the Centre of Albanological Studies.

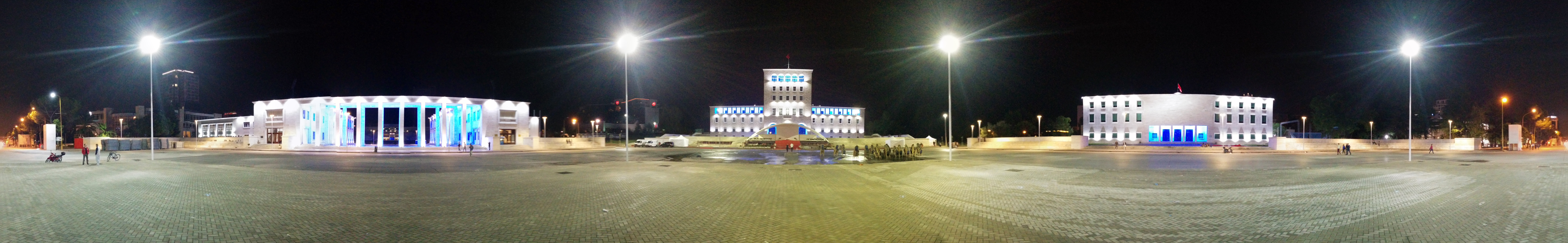
360° panoramic view of Mother Teresa Square by night with University of Tirana campus at the center

On 1980 a fountain was placed on the middle of the square, and after the fall of communism in Albania it was named after Mother Teresa and a statue of her was placed on the east side of the square. Both the statue and the fountain were later removed, after the restoration of the square in 2014 caused by the preparations for the Pope Francis visit in Tirana. Today it is a pedestrian zone, mostly used for different activities and concerts by the Municipality of Tirana.

== See also ==
- Skanderbeg Square
- Dëshmorët e Kombit Boulevard
- Landmarks in Tirana
- Architecture of Albania
