= Ali Demi =

Albanian partisan (1918–1943)

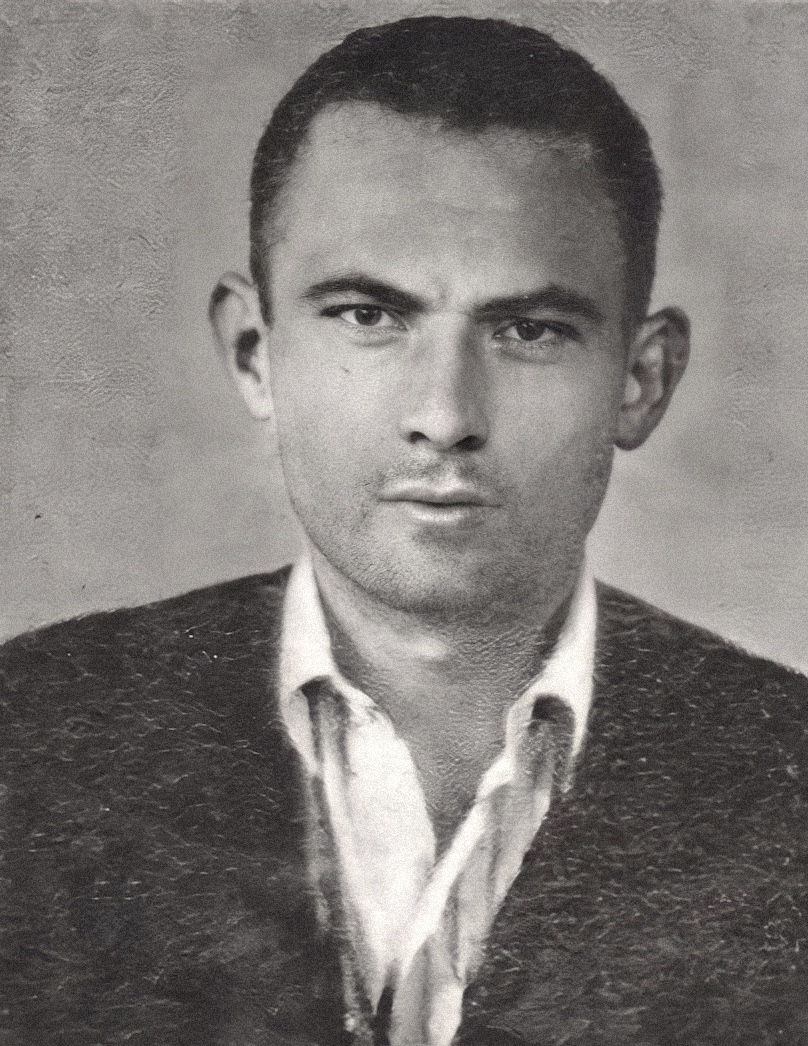
- Demi in 1943
- Born: Ali Ahmet Demi; 18 January 1918; Filiates, Kingdom of Greece
- Died: 19 December 1943 (aged 25); Kaninë, Vlorë, German-occupied Albania
- Cause of death: Assassinated by Balli Kombëtar
- Resting place: National Martyrs' Cemetery
- Political party: PKSH
- Opponents: PFSH; Balli Kombëtar
- Family: Demi family
- Awards: Hero of the People
- Military career
- Allegiance: LANÇ
- Branch: Çermenika Battalion
- Service years: 1943
- Rank: Commissar

Ali Demi (18 January 1918 – 29 December 1943) was an Albanian resistance fighter of World War II and a communist. He was killed in battle fighting German forces in Vlora, Albania in 1943.

== Biography ==
He was born in Filiates, Greece (Çamëria), to a Cham Albanian family. Later Ali Demi studied at the Lyceum, in Tirana, Albania and in 1939 he participated in antifascist demonstrations. He was also one of the founders of the Communist party of Albania. He was sentenced to death by the Italian forces but he managed to escape and join the partisans. In 1943, Demi was killed in a battle against German forces in Kaninë village, near Vlora.

=== Aftermath ===
In May 1944, the Greek People's Liberation Army formed and named a mixed unit of both Greeks and Cham Albanians in his honor, the IV "Ali Demi" battalion of 15th regiment.

Ali Demi Street and Ali Demi (neighborhood) in Tirana, are named after him. There is a statue of Ali Demi in Tirana stating on it “ALI DEMI HERO I POPULLIT” - in English “Ali Demi hero of the people”.
