= Taivani =

Restaurant and casino complex in the Albanian capital Tirana

Coordinates: 41°19′28″N 19°49′3″E

Restaurant information
- Location: Albania

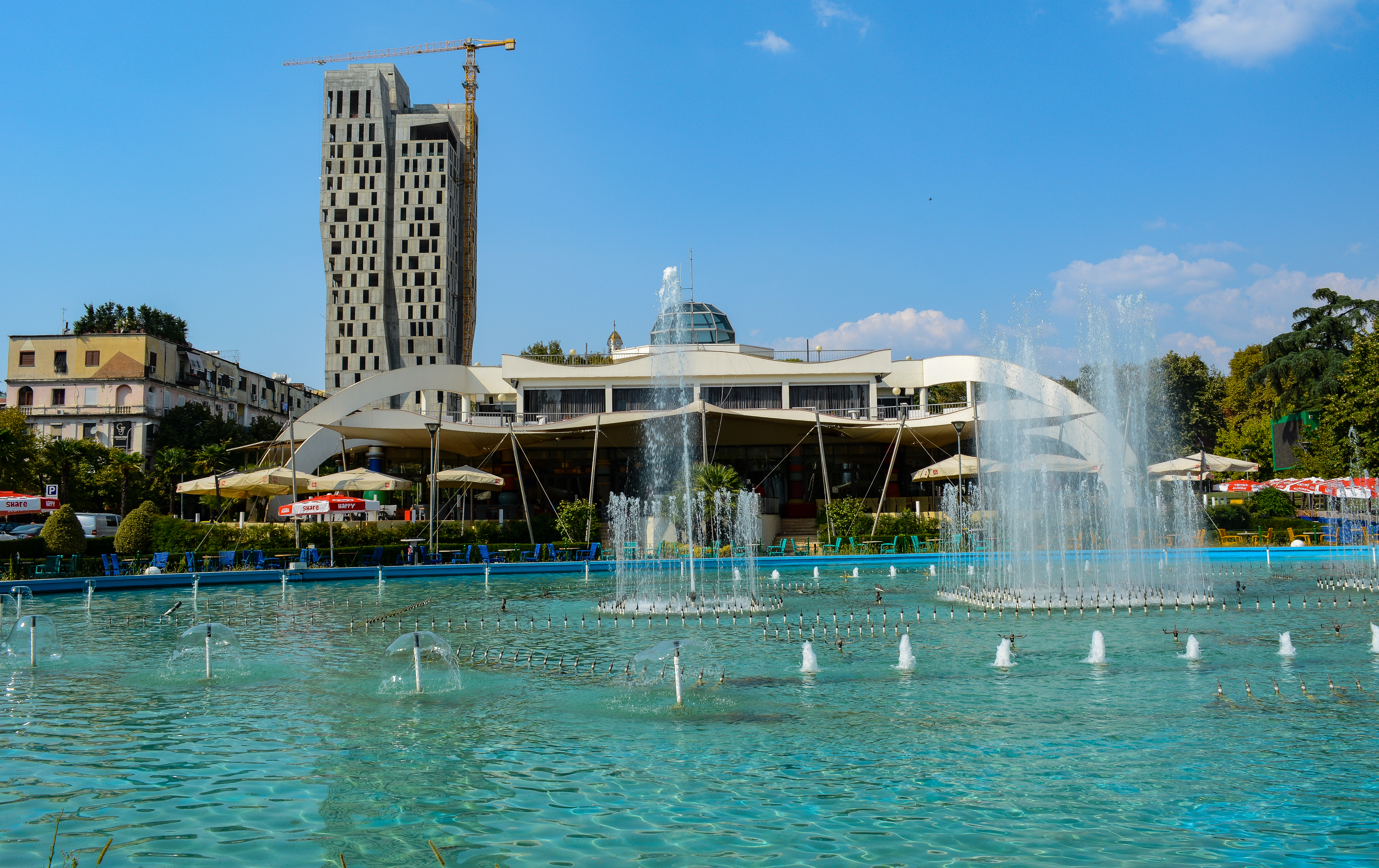
Taivani Center

Taivani or the Taiwan Center, is a restaurant complex, as well as a multifunctional recreation center located in Rinia Park, just south of Skanderbeg Square in downtown Tirana, Albania. Taivani is one of Tirana's most modern and frequented restaurants and spare time facilities. It also includes a well-equipped bowling center. It is known as Taivani or "Taiwan" as it is said to resemble a small island, in the middle of a park.
