= Bajram Curri Boulevard =

Road in Tirana, Albania

Bajram Curri Boulevard Bulevardi i Bajram Currit
- Public Boulevard
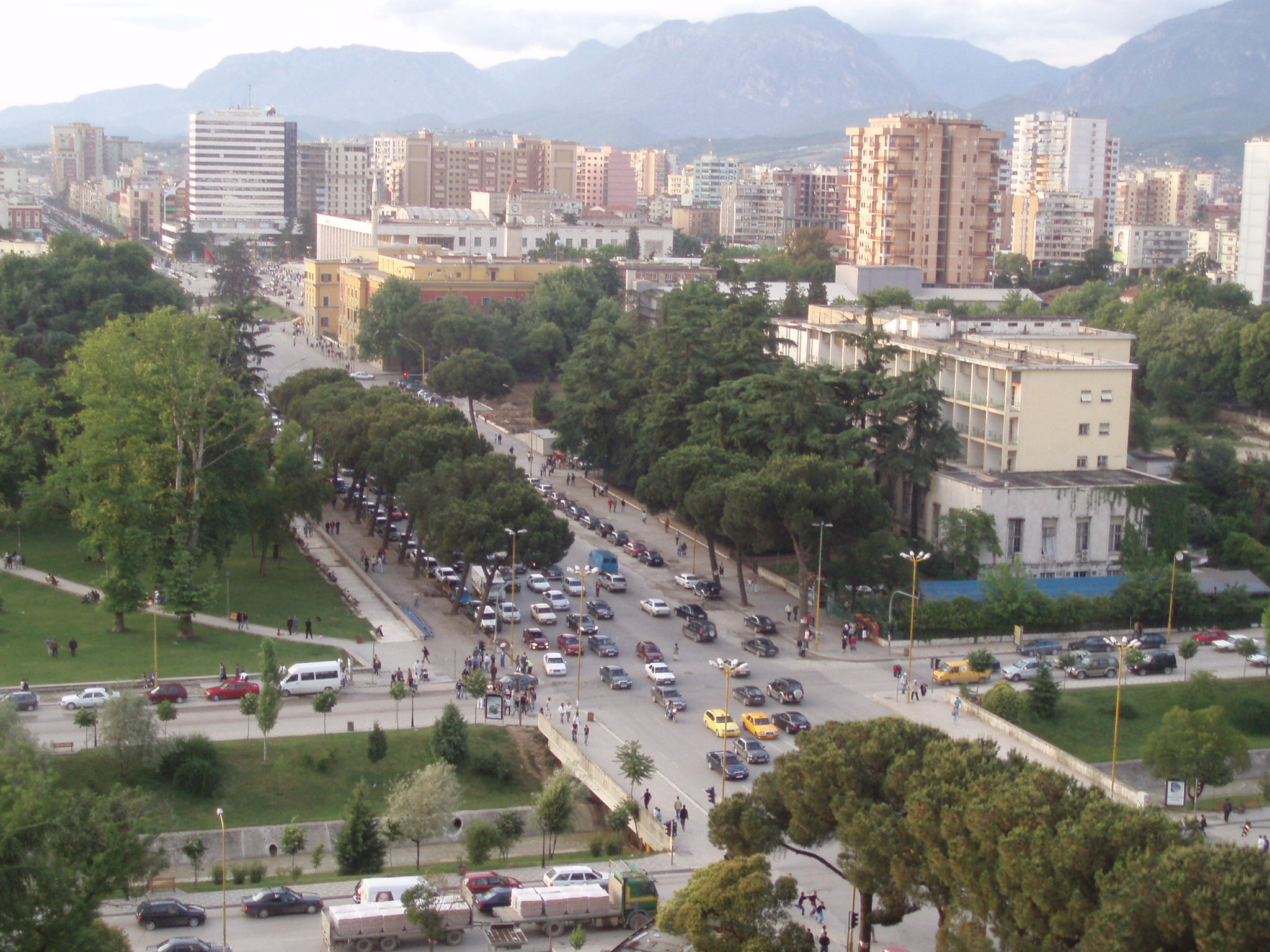
- The boulevard crossing from west to east at the lower portion of the picture, passing the Skanderbeg Square.
- Dedicated to: Bajram Curri
- Location: Tirana Albania
- Interactive map of Bajram Curri Boulevard
- Coordinates: 41°19′25″N 19°49′10″E

Bajram Curri Boulevard is a major boulevard of Tirana, Albania. It runs in a west–east direction and crosses the city centre south of the central Skanderbeg Square. At Rinia Park it intersects with Dëshmorët e Kombit Boulevard just south of the square. Towards the east it branches off into Ali Demi Street. In the past, it held the name Shqiperia e Re. The boulevard, along with Zhan D'Ark Boulevard, underwent reconstruction in 2003.

== See also ==
- Landmarks in Tirana
- Architecture of Albania
