= National Archaeological Museum (Tirana) =

Museum in Tirana, Albania

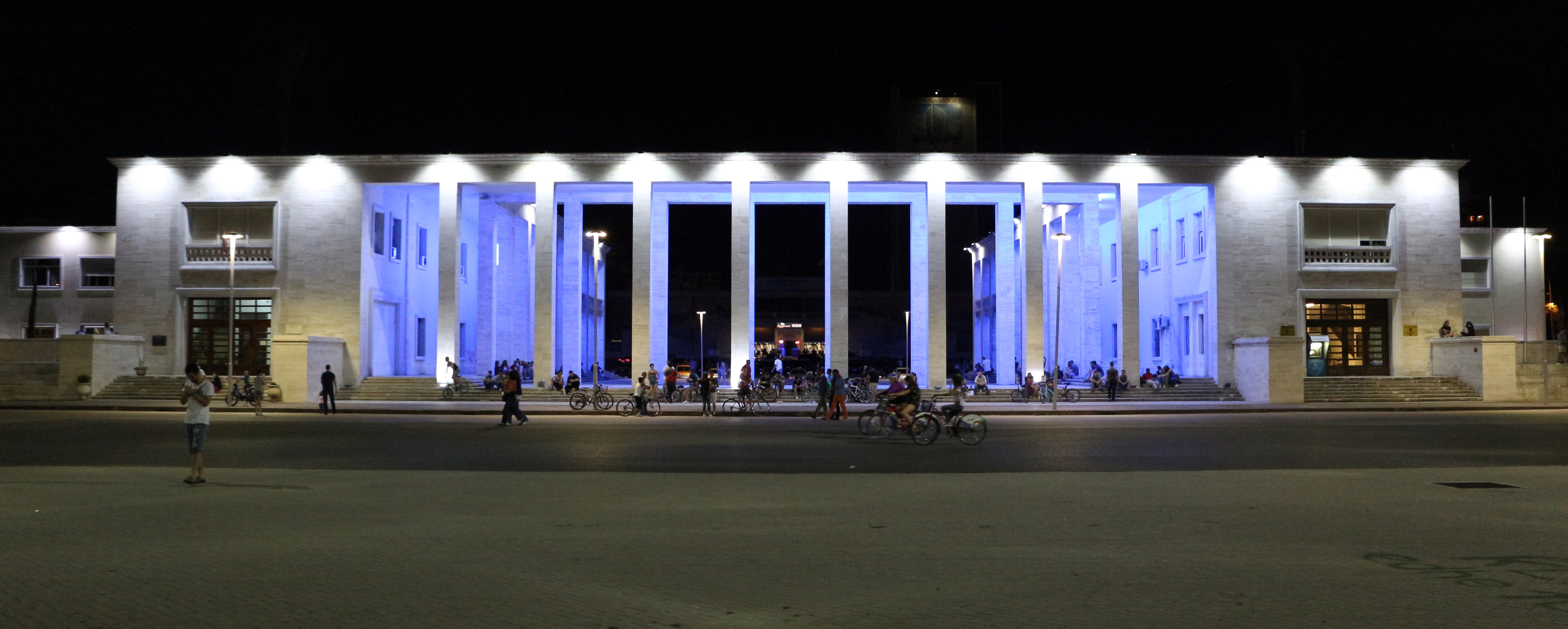
- View of the Museum at night
- Established: 1 November 1948; 77 years ago
- Location: Mother Teresa Square 3, 1010 Tirana, Albania
- Coordinates: 41°19′06″N 19°49′19″E

The National Archaeological Museum (Albanian: Muzeu Arkeologjik Kombëtar) is the national archaeological museum in Tirana, Albania opened on 1 November 1948. It was the first museum founded after the second World War in the country. It is located on the east of the Mother Teresa Square near the University of Tirana.

This Museum was opened in 1948 and today presents the research of archaeological discoveries in the territory of Albania. It is affiliated to the institute of archaeology of the Academy of Sciences of Albania. The Museum houses exhibits from Prehistoric and Classical times up to the Middle Ages and Modern period. More than 2000 items are displayed and these items range from ancient jewellery, to Roman statues, to vast clay pots covered in shellfish that have been found during the many archaeological field trips the museum is involved in. It is also responsible for conducting many archaeological expeditions in the country and is the parent institution of several other museums in the country including the Durrës Archaeological Museum.

The Museum include also a library of some 7200 volumes.

The 2000 objects exhibited by the museum belong to the following ages: the Stone Age from 100.000 to 2000 BC, the Bronze Age and Iron Age from 2000 to 800 BC, the Beginnings of the Illyrian Civilisation from ca. 1000 BC, the Illyrian Antiquity from 1000 BC to 100 AD, the Roman and Byzantine Civilisation in Albania from 100 to 600 AD and the Albania in the Middle Ages and the Ottoman rule in Albania from 600 until the independence in 1912.

== Gallery ==
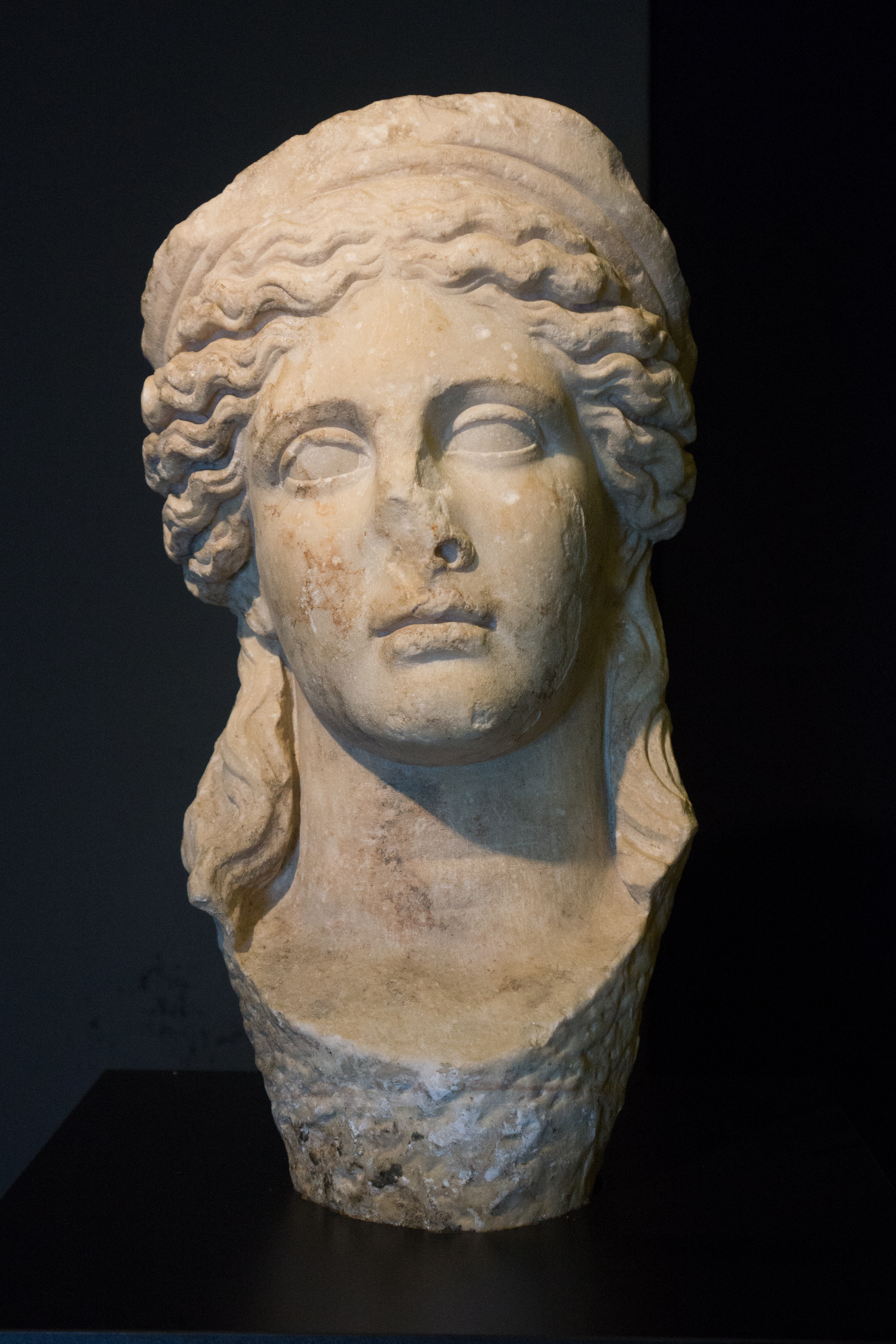
Head of Hera (2nd century)

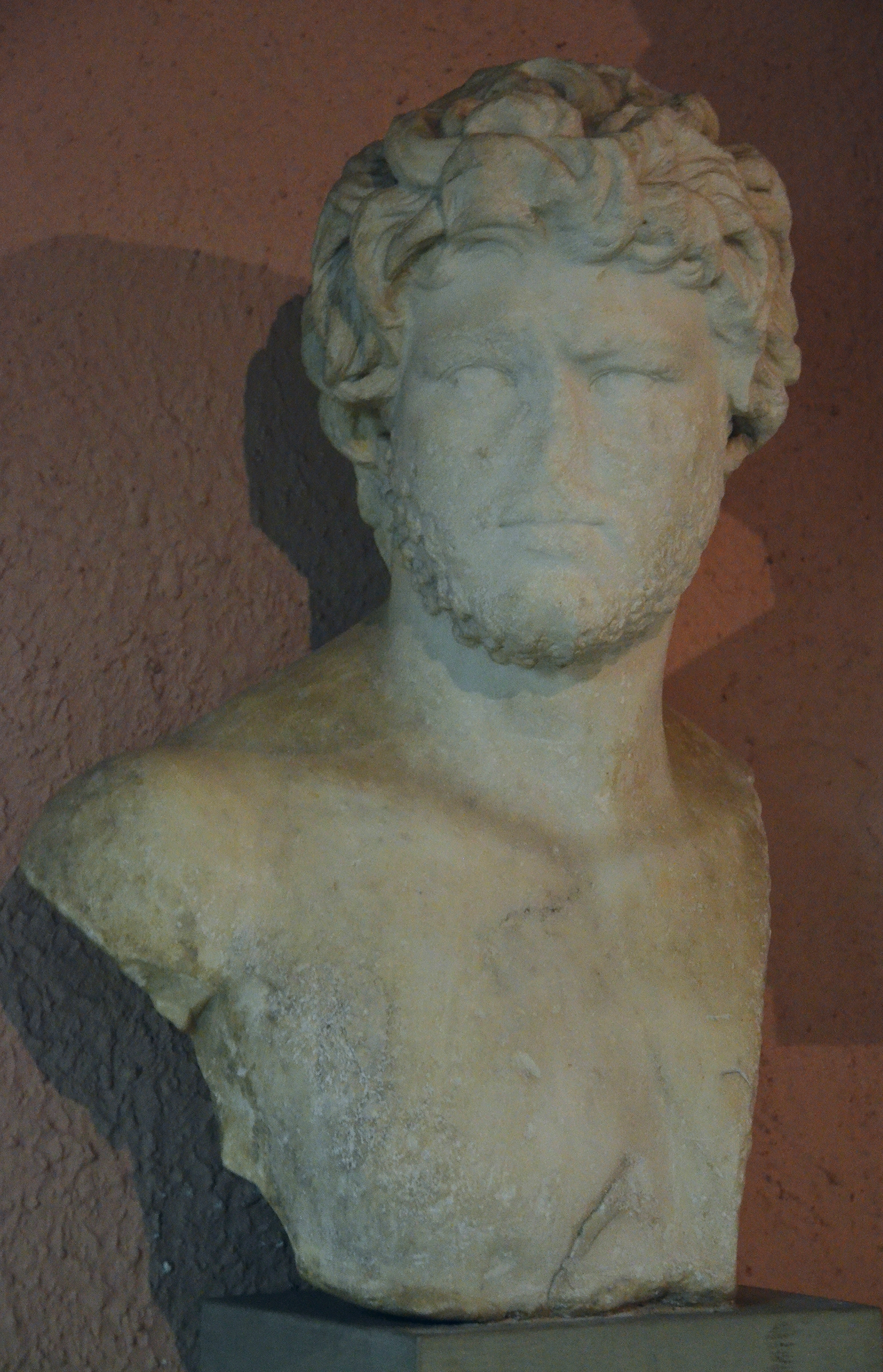
Bust of Caracalla

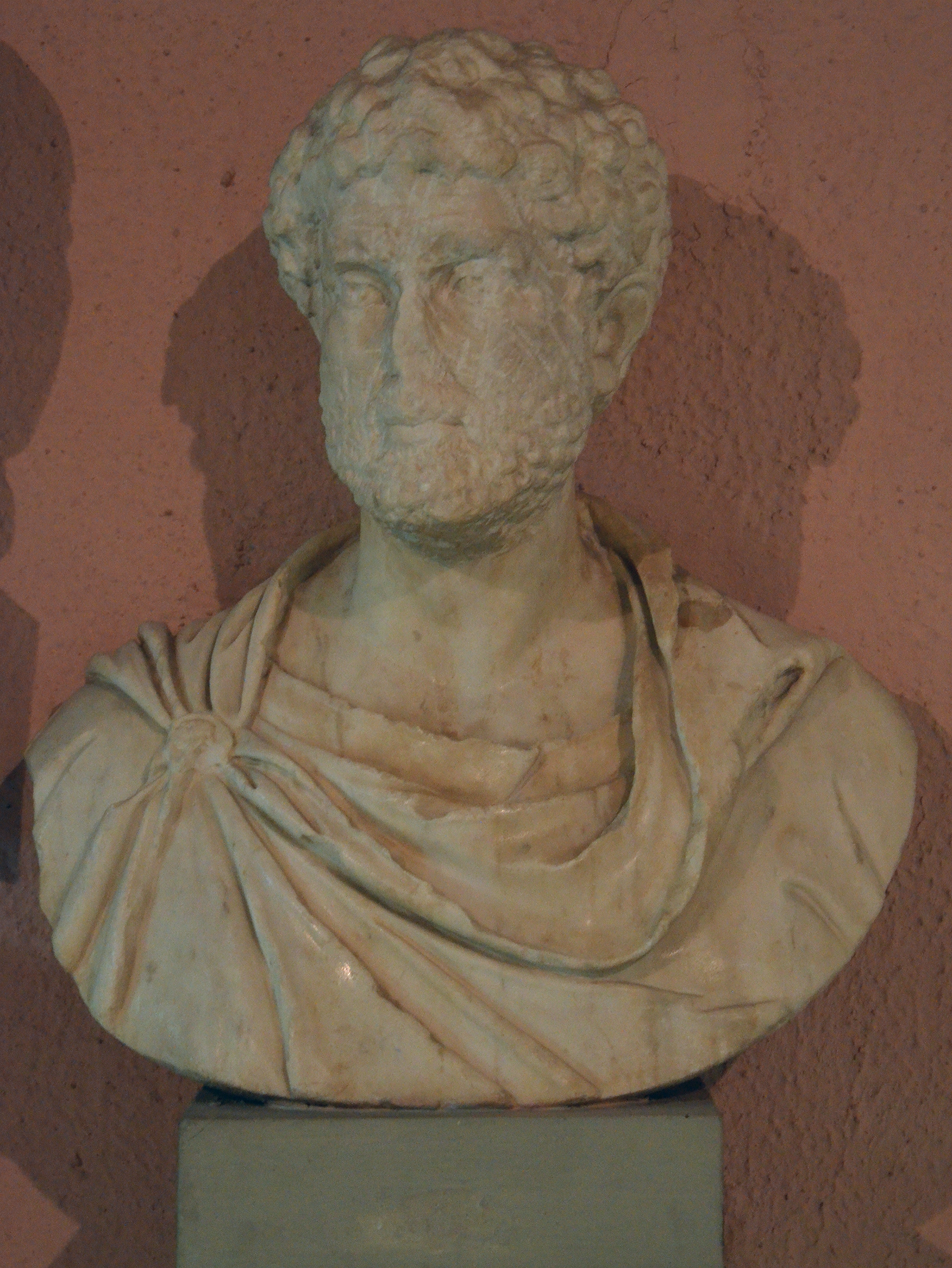
Bust of Marcus Aurelius

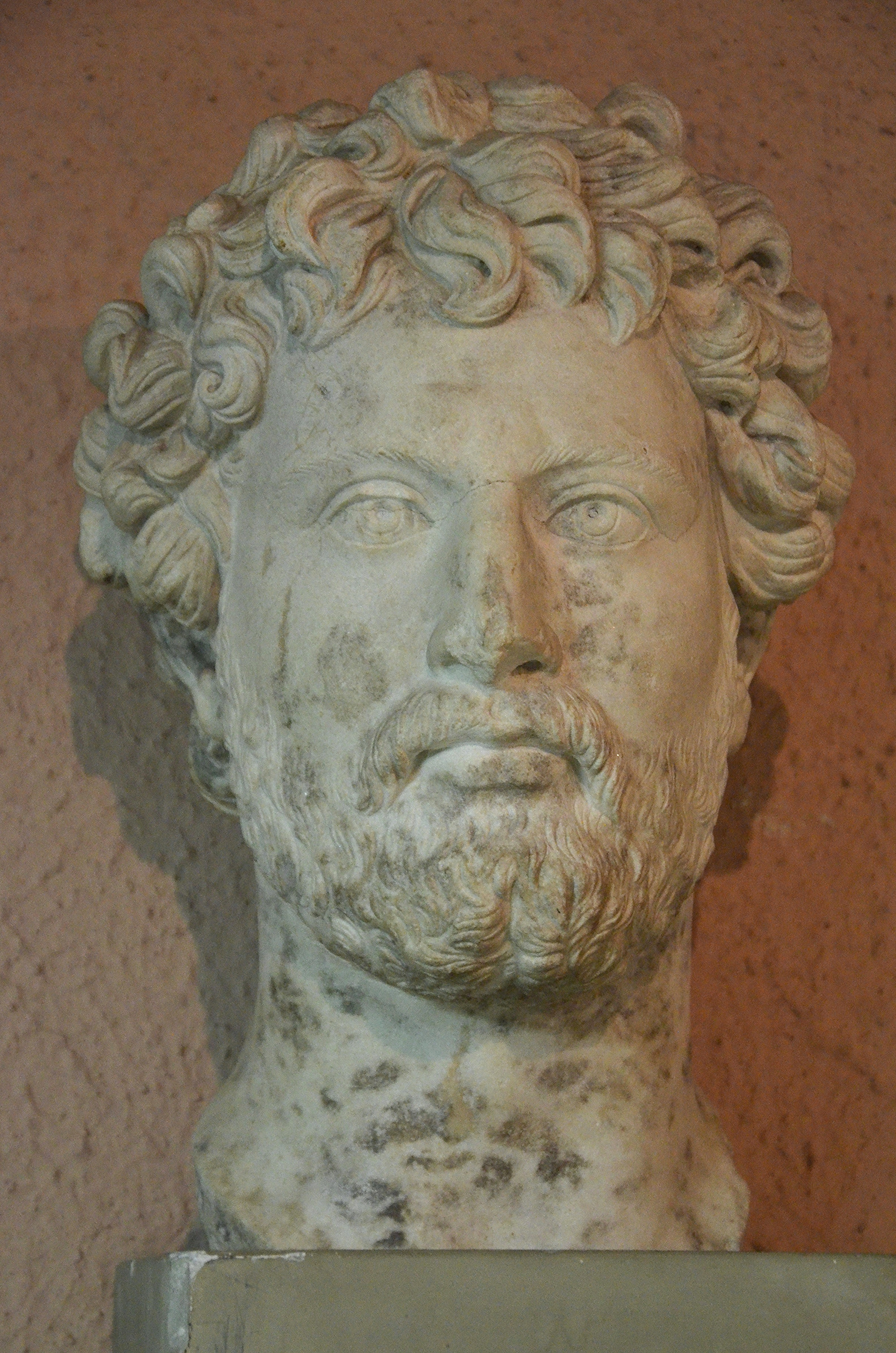
Head of Hadrian

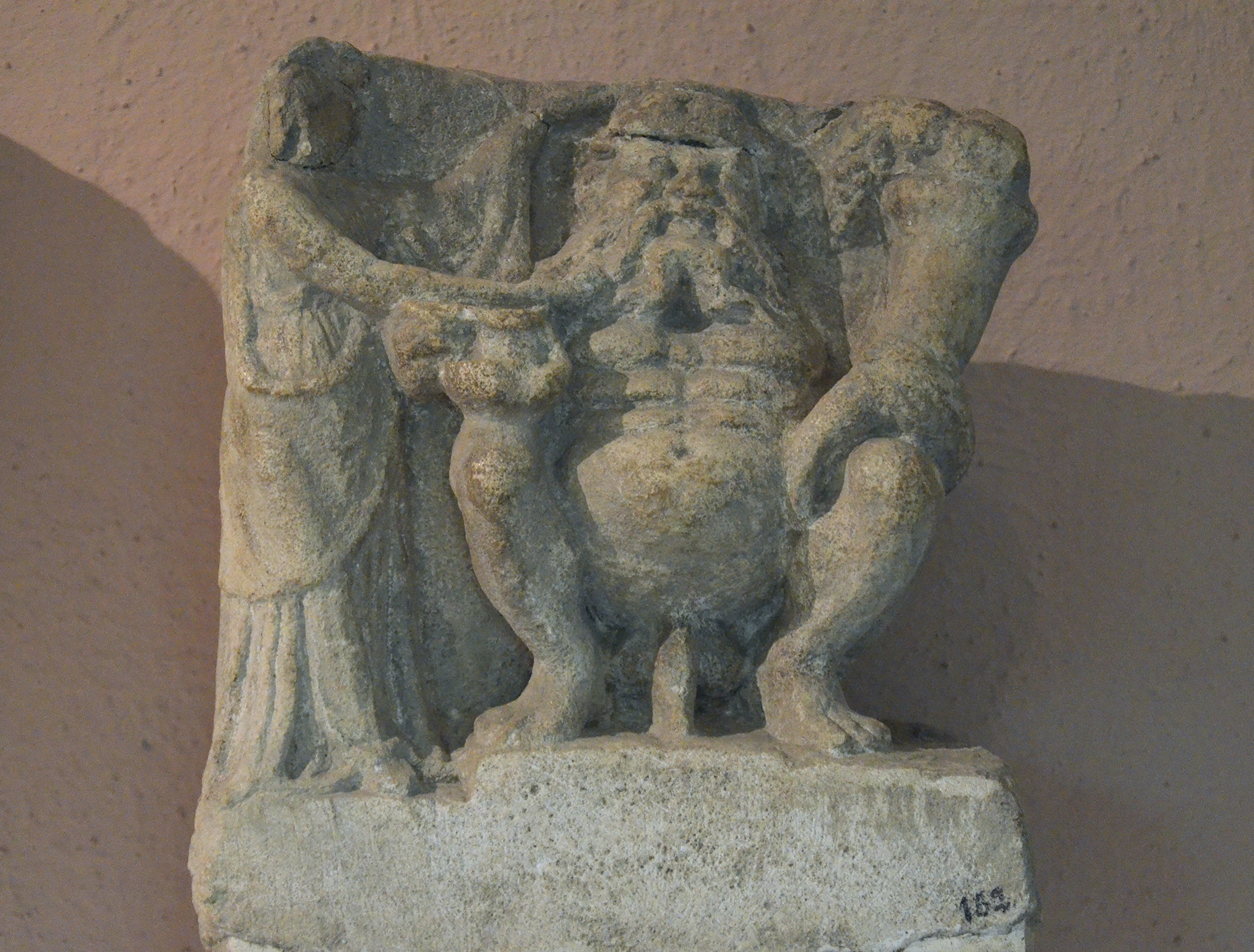
God of Fertility (3rd century)

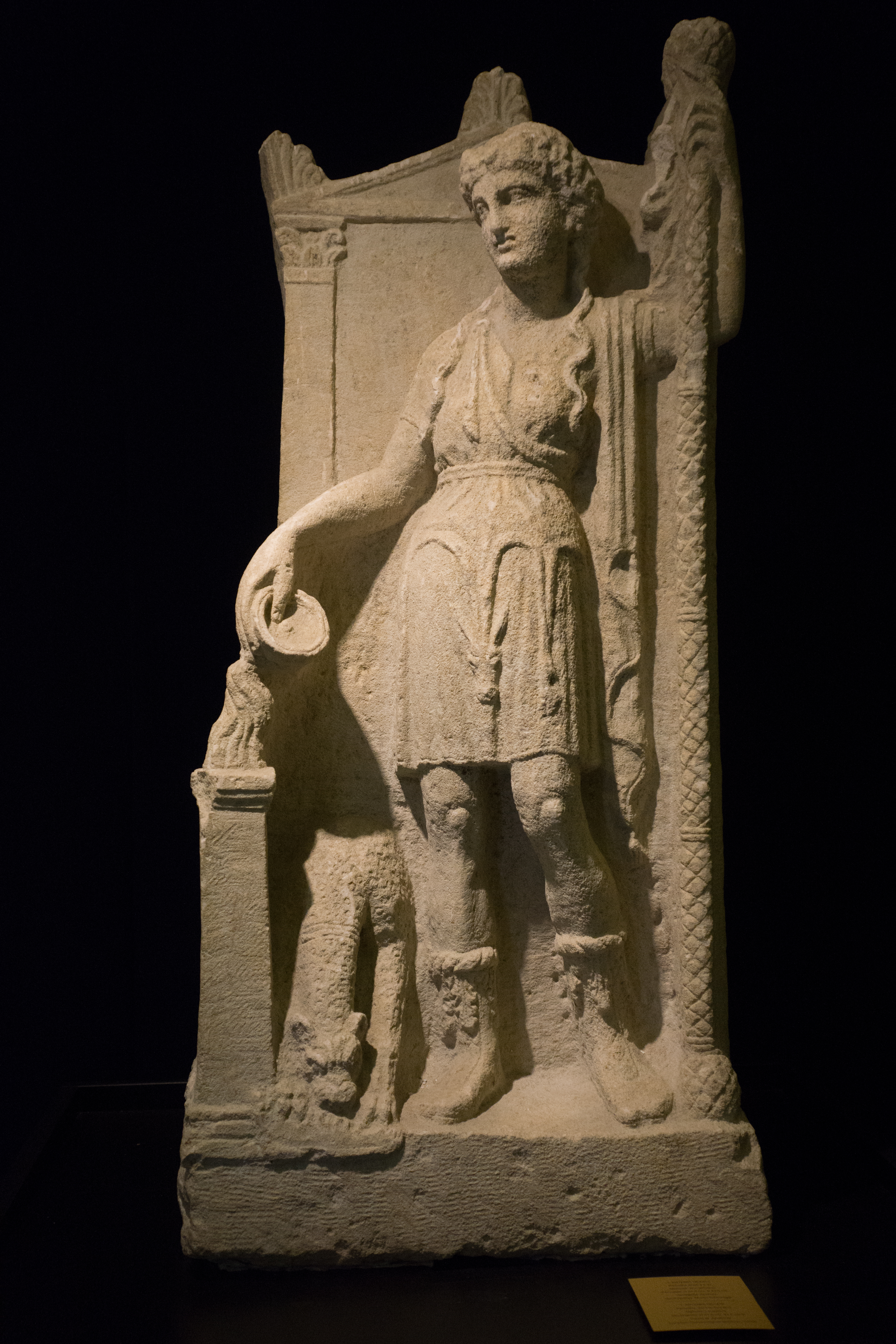
Artemis Hecate (3rd century)

== See also ==
- Culture of Tirana
- Landmarks in Tirana
- History of Albania
