= Ali Demi (neighborhood) =

Neighbourhood of Tirana, Albania

Coordinates: 41°19′39″N 19°49′46″E

- Neighborhood
- Interactive map of Ali Demi
- Country: Albania
- City: Tirana

Ali Demi is one of the oldest neighborhoods in Tirana, Albania. It is named after Ali Demi, a World War II hero. The street of the same name is a primary artery of both the Ali Demi neighborhood and Tirana. The adjacent neighborhood of Mihal Grameno is sometimes included as part of Ali Demi.
