= Ali Demi Street =

Street in Tirana, Albania

Coordinates: 41°19′39″N 19°49′46″E

Ali Demi Street (Albanian: Rruga e Ali Demit) is a major street of Tirana, Albania. It is named after Ali Demi, a World War II hero. It is an important artery of eastern Tirana and branches off Bajram Curri Boulevard. The Ministry of Foreign Affairs headquarters, as well as several universities and colleges, are located on this street.

== See also ==
- Ali Demi (neighborhood)
