= Gjovalin Gjadri =

Albanian engineer and academic (1899–1974)

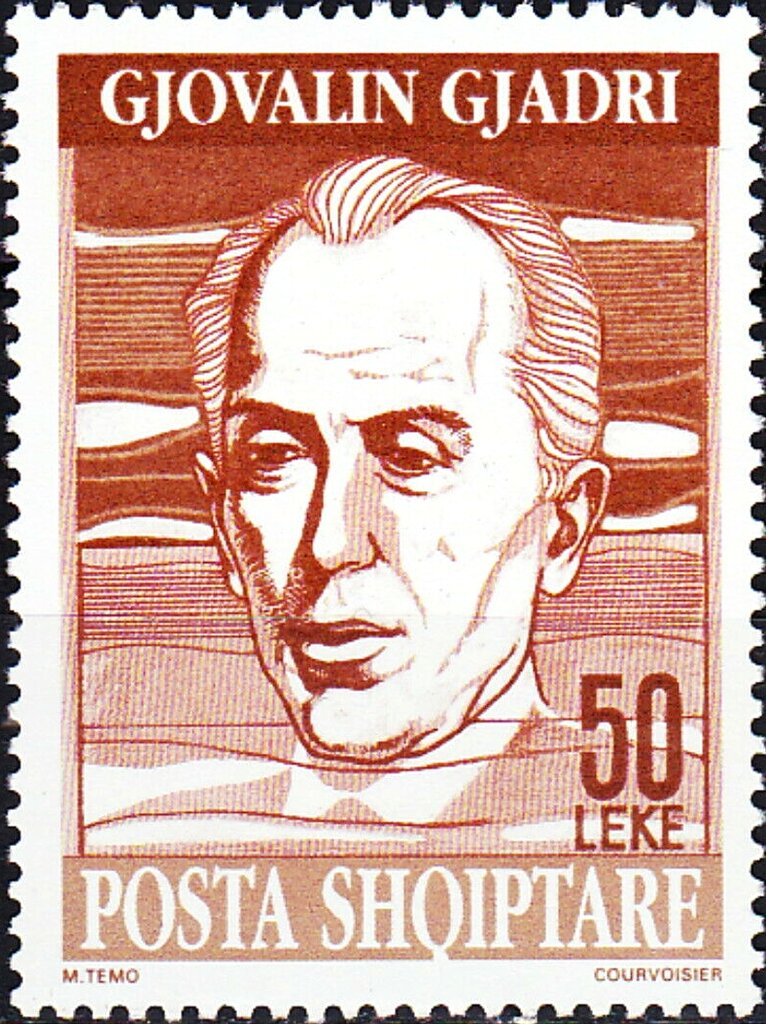

Gjovalin Gjadri (1899–March 13, 1974) was an Albanian engineer, academic, and builder, born in Shkodër, then part of the Ottoman Empire. Among his works are the bridge on Dëshmorët e Kombit Boulevard in Tirana and the arch bridge of Mat (river), near Milot, Albania.

== See also ==
- Biographical sketch (in Albanian)
- National Tourism Agency
