= Rinia Park =

Public park in Tirana, Albania

Coordinates: 41°19′29″N 19°49′5″E

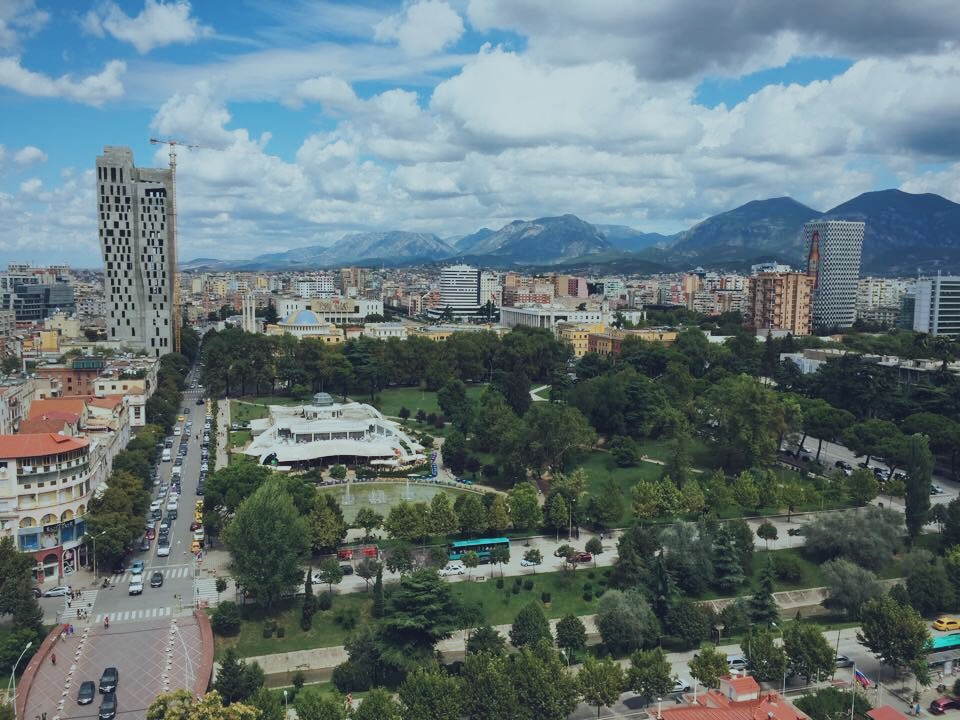
- Rinia Park shown to the left beyond the crossroads. Skanderbeg Square to the north in the heart of Tirana
- Type: Park
- Location: Tirana, Albania
- Created: 1950

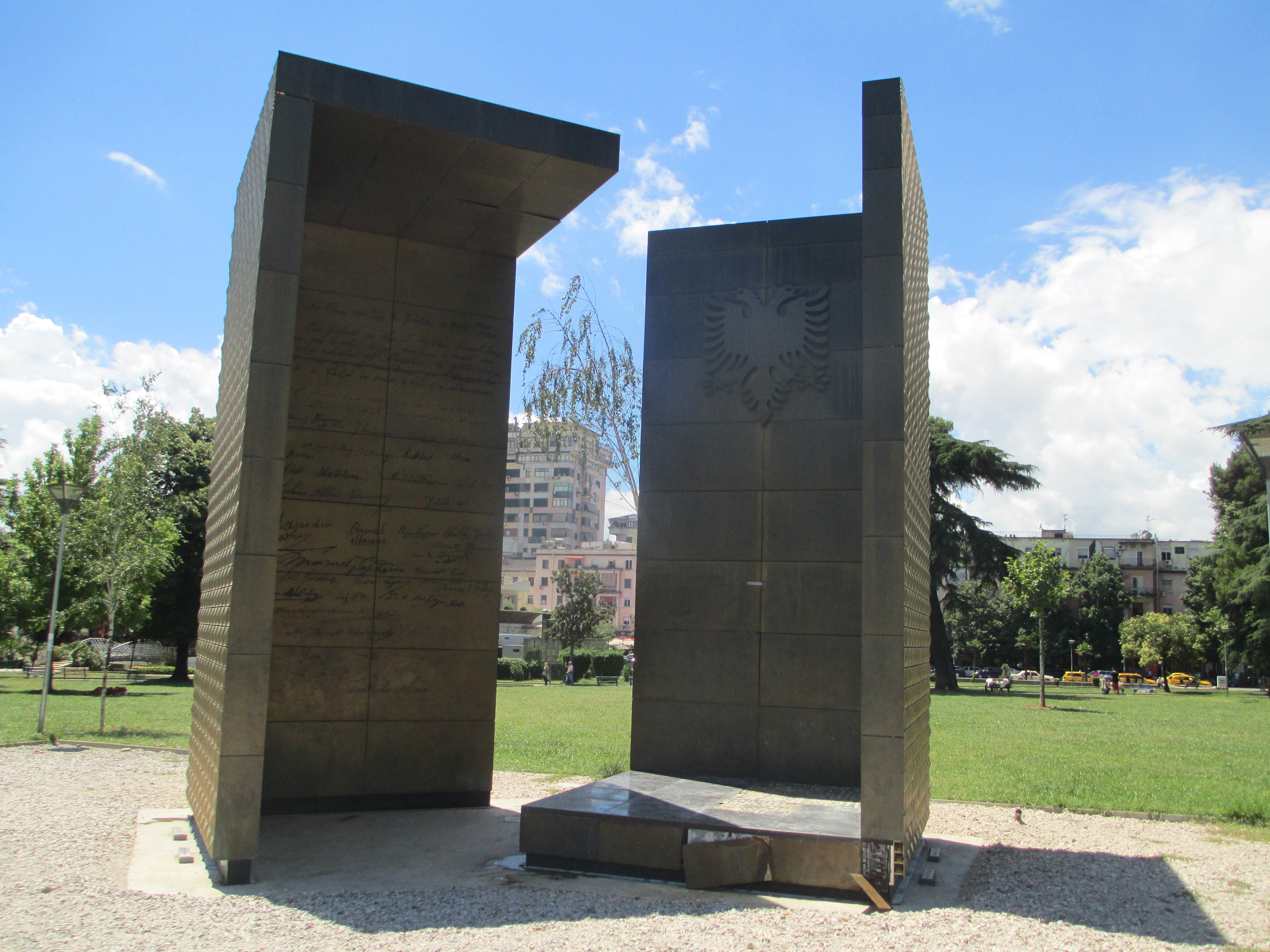
Monument of the 100th anniversary of Independence of Albania in Tirana located in Rinia Park

Rinia Park (literally "Youth Park", Albanian: Parku Rinia) is the central public park of Tirana, Albania. Built in 1950 during the communist era, it covers an area of 2.98 hectares (7.4 acres).

== Geography ==
The park, 500 metres (1,600 ft) from the central square, is bordered by Dëshmorët e Kombit Boulevard to the east, Bulevardi Gjergi Fishta and Bajram Curri Boulevard to the south, Rruga Ibrahim Rugova (former "Deshmoret e 4 Shkurtit") to the west and Rruga Myslym Shyri to the north. Immediately to the north is the Teatri i Kukullave and the Orthodox Cathedral. The Taivani Center and water fountain are located on the western perimeter of the park.

== History ==
Rinia Park was built in 1950 as part of a major urban development program which developed after World War II. It was initially a pleasant family park where inhabitants of Tirana could take their children. It was a relatively free space for youth of Tirana, while standing right in front of the communist "Block" across the Lana River, thus it started to be called ironically "Taiwan". Later a complex of cafés and restaurants was erected.

In 1991, after the end of communism, illegal buildings sprang up all around the park; most of these buildings were kiosks, bars and restaurants, and the park became notorious as a hang-out for the kingpins of Tirana's underworld. During the city's cleanup in 2000, these buildings were razed and the park was replanted. All in all, some 130 buildings were demolished and over 45,000 cubic metres (1,600,000 cu ft) of waste removed.

== Taivani ==
Rinia Park's main landmark is a white, terraced building on its western edge, which houses cafés, restaurants, the Regency Casino (one of only a few legally operating in Tirana), fountains, and a bowling lane in the basement, and which, because of its peculiar architecture, has been likened to a typical James Bond film villain's den or described as spider-shaped. After an old nickname for the park, one of the restaurants (Taivani Bar & Grill) as well as the entire center (Taivani Center) is known as the Taivani.

== Summer Festival ==
Every year on March 14, the people of Tirana and Albania have the Summer Festival, their largest pagan festival which is intended to celebrate the end of winter, the rebirth of nature and a rejuvenation of spirit amongst the Albanians. Although the epicentre of this festival is in Shkumbin (Elbasan), the festival is widely celebrated in Tirana and as far afield as the Arbëresh colonies in Italy. In Tirana many festivities are organized including a city marathon and are generally performed between 9 am and 9 pm. In Rinia Park, a circus show is put on the evenings and is packed with circus performers, acrobats, magicians, and people celebrating the festival.
