= Zhan D'Ark Boulevard =

Street in Tirana, Albania

Coordinates: 41.3308°N 19.8347°E

Zhan D'Ark Boulevard is a boulevard of Tirana, Albania. It runs along the north bank of the river Lanë. It was named after the French heroine Joan of Arc (French: Jeanne d'Arc). Until recently, it held the name Rruga Marsel Kashen in honor of the French politician Marcel Cachin. The boulevard, along with Bajram Curri Boulevard which runs parallel to it, underwent reconstruction in 2003.
