= Spartakiad (Albania) =

Mass gymnastics displays (1959–1989)

Albanian Spartakiad
- Status: Cancelled
- Genre: Sports event
- Date: Varying
- Country: Albania
- Years active: 1959–1989

The Albanian Spartakiad was an event similar to the Soviet Spartakiad and to the Czechoslovak Spartakiad. Six such events were held in Albania during Communist rule (in 1959, 1969, 1974, 1979, 1984, and 1989).

The Spartakiad included a mass gymnastics display, professional and amateur sports championships. It was the biggest sports event in Albania during communist rule, with hundreds of thousands of participants.
