= Gherardo Bosio =

Italian architect, engineer and urban planner

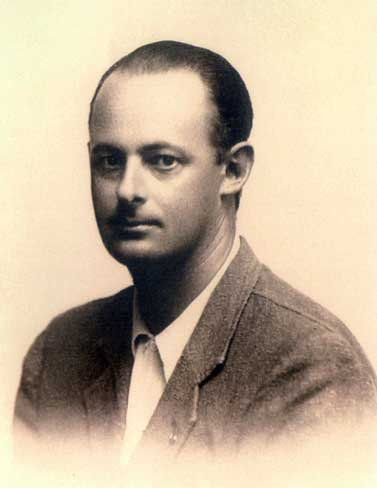
- Born: 19 March 1903; Florence, Tuscany, Italy
- Died: 16 April 1941 (aged 38); Florence, Tuscany, Italy
- Occupation: Architect
- Buildings: Presidential Palace, Tirana, Grand Hotel Dajti

Gherardo Bosio (19 March 1903 – 16 April 1941) was an Italian architect, engineer and urbanist, famed for his work in planning the centre of Tirana, the capital of Albania.

== Life and career ==
Bosio pursued a degree in Engineering in Rome in 1926 and subsequently graduated from the University of Florence School of Architecture in 1931.

After the conquest of Italian East Africa in 1936, Bosio was dispatched by the Italian authorities to Ethiopia, where he prepared the masterplans for the Ethiopian cities of Gondar and Dessie. From 1939 onward, he worked in Albania, especially in Tirana, designing numerous government buildings and urban plans, often in collaboration with Ferdinando Poggi.

Bosio died of cancer at the age of 38, on 16 April 1941, at his villa in Montefonti, Florence.

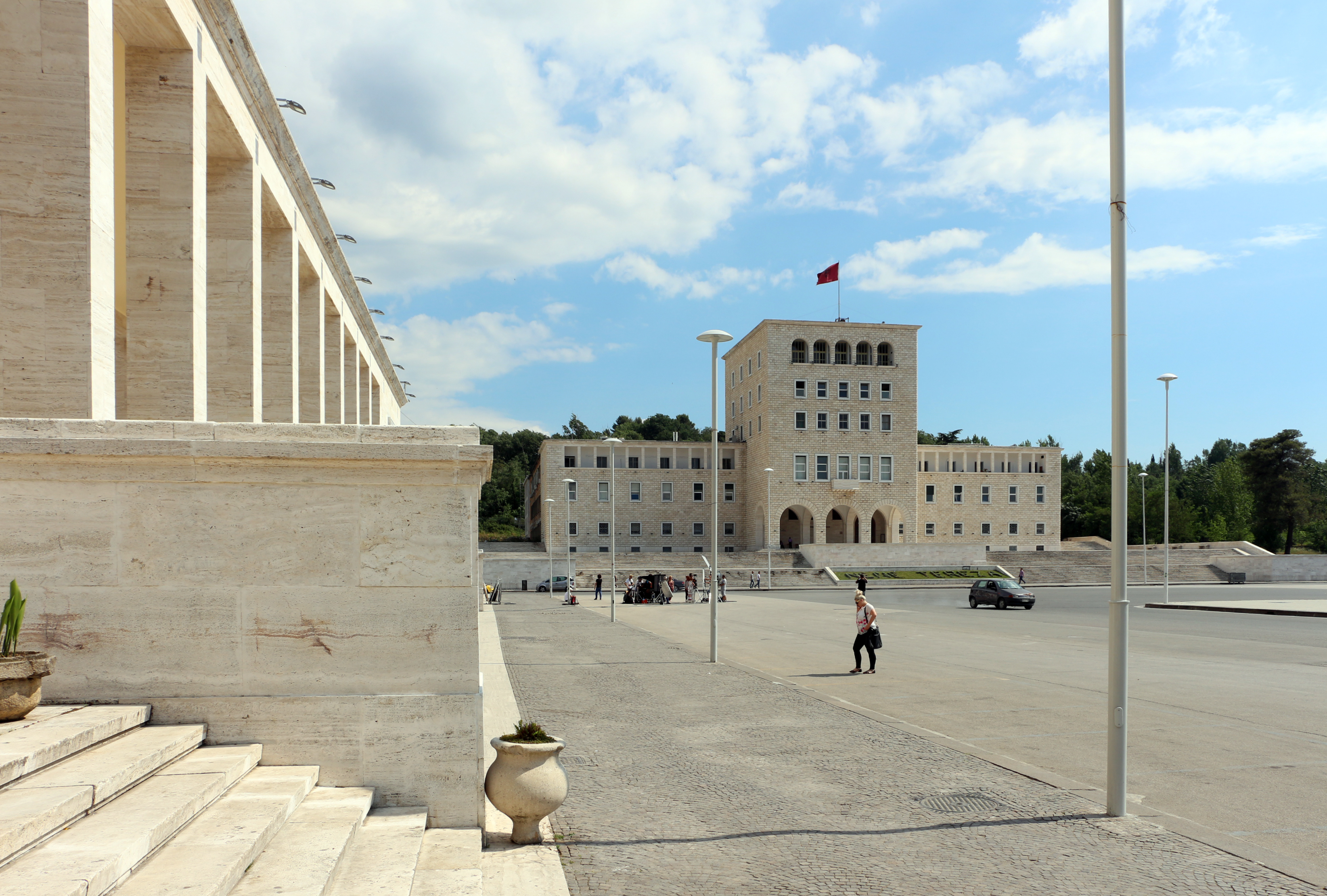
"Nënë Tereza" Square in Tirana, built by Bosio in Rationalist style

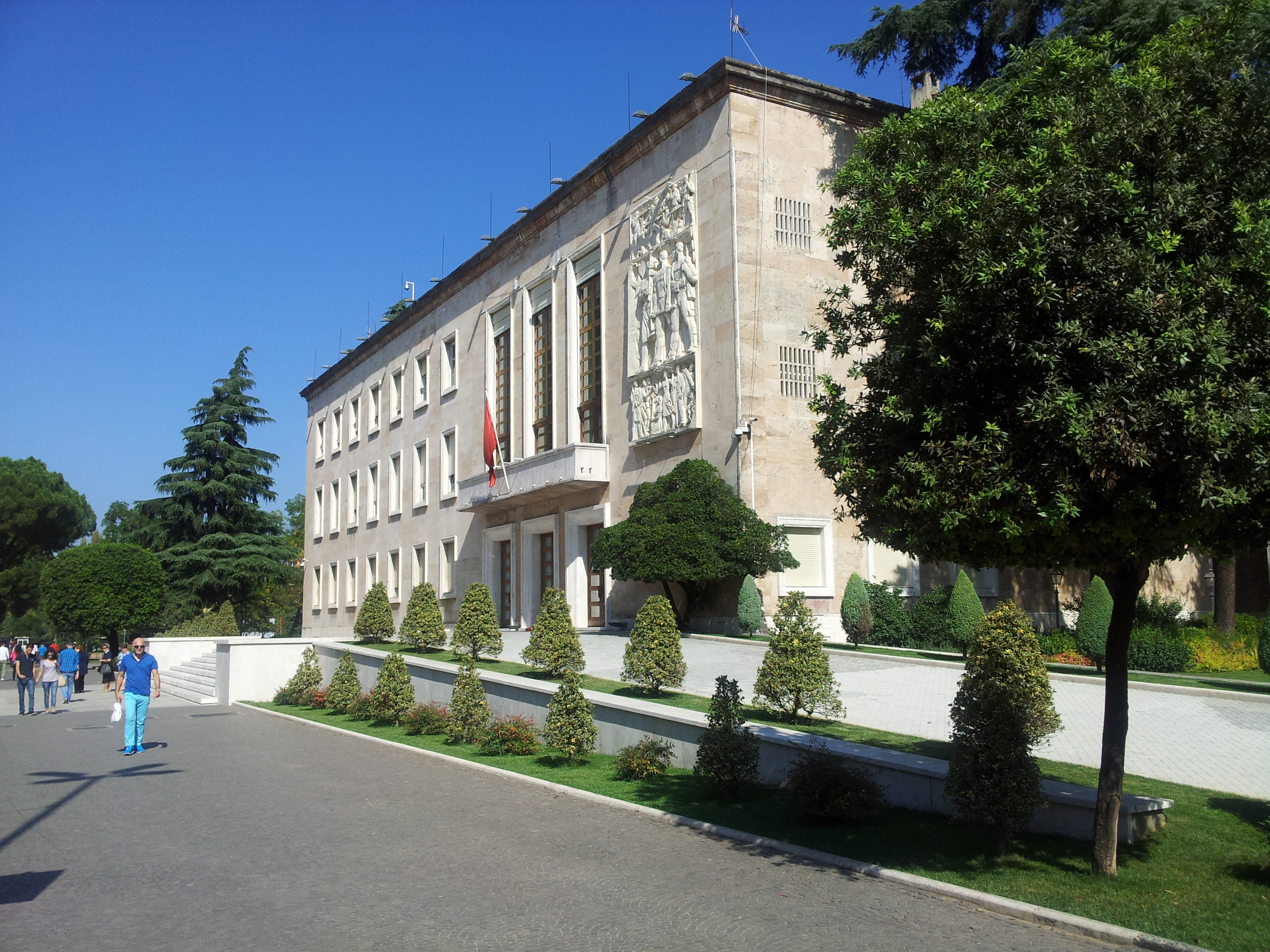
Office of the Prime Minister of Albania, built by Bosio in Rationalist style

== Summary of works ==
- Renovation and extension to Villa Acton, Florence, 1927–29
- Project in the Competition for the Christopher Columbus Memorial Lighthouse, Santo Domingo, 1928–29
- Restoration, expansion and furniture design for Casa Uzielli, Florence, 1929–32
- Sisters of the Blue Chapel on Via Cherubini, Florence, 1930–31
- Furniture design for Casa Maraini, Florence, 1932
- Project of Nursing Home on Viale dei Colli, Florence, 1932
- Furniture design for Casa Traballesi, Florence, 1933
- Villa Ginori Conti, Cerreto di Pomarance, 1934
- Ugolino Golf House, Impruneta, 1934 (in collaboration with Pier Luigi Nervi)
- Furniture design for the Italian Institute of Culture, Budapest, 1935
- Restoration and furnishing of the offices of the Monsavano company, Pontassieve, 1935
- Restoration and furnishing of Villa Pandolfini, Tizzano San Polo, 1935
- Furnishing for the Foreign Ministry, Rome, 1935–37
- Furniture design for Casa Della Gherardesca, Florence, 1936
- Project for the Masterplan of Gondar, Italian East Africa, 1936
- Project for the Masterplan of Dessie, Italian East Africa, 1936
- Project for the Masterplan of Tirana, Albania, 1939
- "Martyrs of the Nation" Boulevard, Tirana, Albania, 1939–41
- Grand Hotel Dajti, Tirana, Albania, 1939–41
- Casa del Fascio, Tirana, Albania 1939–41
- Palazzo della Luogotenenza (now housing the Office of the Prime Minister), Tirana, Albania 1939–41
- Presidential Palace, Tirana, Albania 1939–41

== Bibliography ==
- G. Bosio, Future città dell'Impero , in "Architettura", XVI, July 1937, pp. 417–432
- TO. Maraini, Gherardo Bosio e la sua opera , in "Illustrazione Toscana e dell'Etruria", 9, September 1941, pp. 18–21
- G. Bridges, Ricordo di Gherardo Bosio , in "Stile", July 1941, pp 14–19
- G. Carapelli, Gli operatori, in Edilizia in Toscana fra le due guerre , Edifir, Florence 1994, pp 214–215
- Gherardo Bosio architetto fiorentino 1903–1941 , edited by C. Cresti, Pontecorboli, Florence 1996
- P. Malentacchi, Scheda su Gherardo Bosio in Guida agli archivi di architetti e ingegneri del Novecento in Toscana , edited by E. Insabato, C. Ghelli, pp. 77–83
- R. Renzi, Gherardo Bosio. Le Ville , Alinea, Florence 2010
