= Brez (clothing) =

Albanian traditional belt

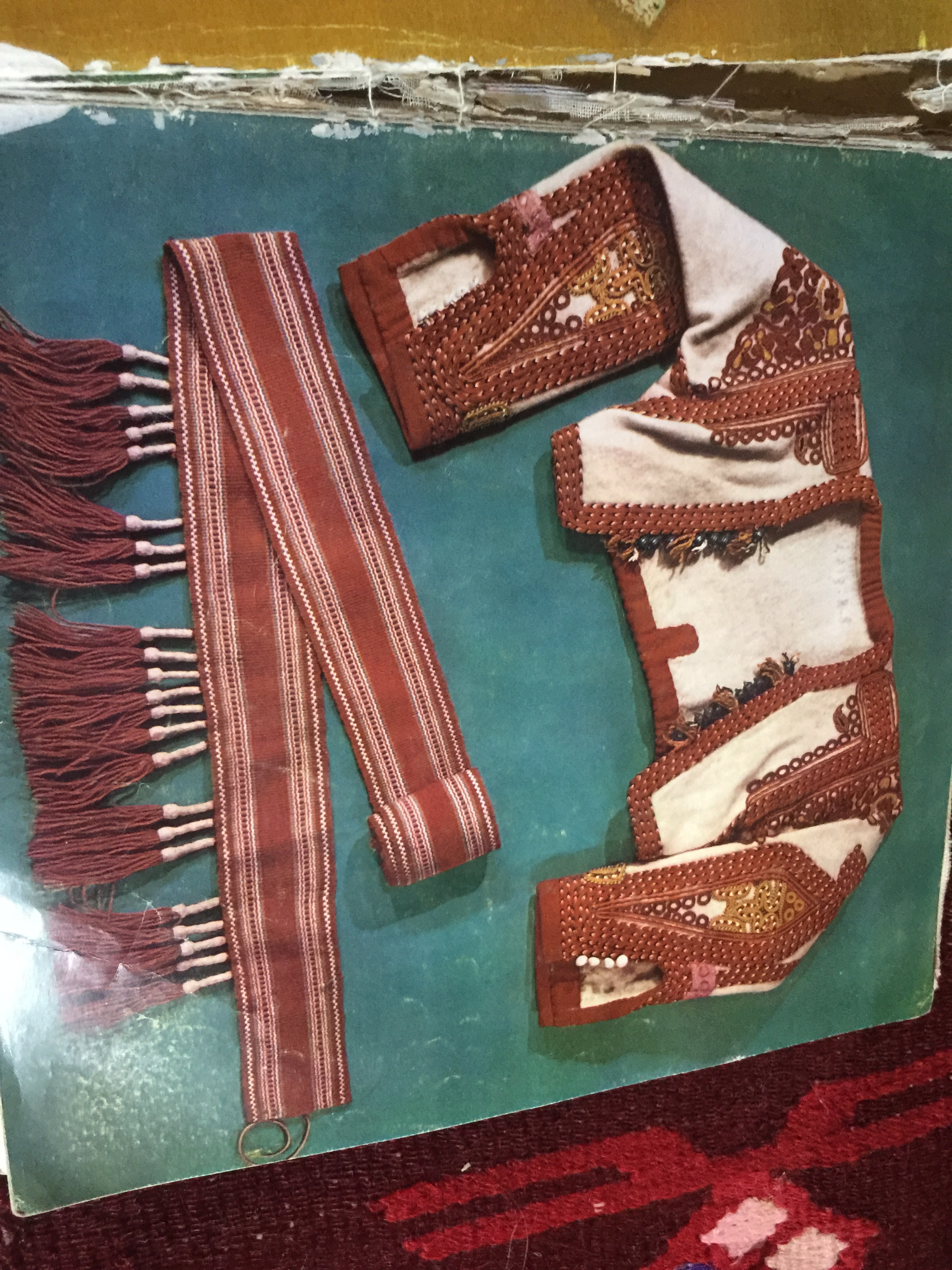
Albanian traditional brez and xhamadan.

The Brez (Albanian: Brez or Brezi) is a traditional belt worn by men throughout Albania, Kosovo, North Macedonia, Serbia, Montenegro, Romania (brâu) and in the Arbëresh villages of Italy. It originates directly from the Illyrian belt. This belt is most commonly worn in the male traditional outfits throughout Albania, notably in the North, near Vlora and other cities.

== See also ==
- Culture of Albania
- Plis
- Vest
- Qeleshe
- Albanian traditional clothing
