= Gjergji =

Gjergji is both a surname and a given name. It is commonly used by Albanian Christians. The name was popularised amongst Albanians by Saint George. Notable people with the name include:

== Surname ==
- Andromaqi Gjergji (1928–2015), Albanian ethnologist
- Dodë Gjergji (born 1963), Albanian Roman Catholic bishop
- Helidon Gjergji (born 1970), Albanian artist
- Matilda Gjergji (born 2003), Albanian footballer
- Beatriçe Gjergji (born 1990), Albanian singer

== Given name ==
- Gjergji Dëma (born 1971), Albanian footballer
- Gjergji Kasneci, German computer scientist
- Gjergji Muzaka (born 1984), Albanian footballer
- Gjergji Papa, Albanian politician

== See also ==
- Gjergj (disambiguation)
