= National symbols of Albania =

The national symbols of Albania are symbols that are used in Albania to represent what is unique about the nation, reflecting different aspects of its culture and history. The symbols may also be used in Kosovo, North Macedonia, Montenegro, Greece (Chameria), Serbia (Preševo Valley) and by the Arbëreshë in Italy.

== Official symbols ==
Type	Image	Symbol
National flag		Flag of Albania The flag of Albania (Albanian: Flamuri i Shqipërisë) is a red flag with a black double-headed eagle in the centre. A banner with a double-headed eagle is attested as having been used by several Albanian principalities since the early Middle Ages such as the Muzaka, Thopia, Kastrioti and Dukagjini families.
National colours		Red and Black Red and black was used much earlier but officially by the League of Lezhë (1444–1479).
Coat of arms		Coat of arms of Albania Adopted by Albanian Parliament in 1992.
National anthem	Himni i Flamurit (Instrumental)	Himni i Flamurit "Himni i Flamurit" was the anthem of the all Albanian states since 1912, composer Romanian Ciprian Porumbescu. Original title "Pe-al nostru steag e scris Unire". Lyrics translated in Albanian by the Romanian of Albanian origin poet Victor Eftimiu.
National motto	Ti Shqipëri, më jep nder, më jep emrin Shqipëtar You, Albania, give me honor, give me the name Albanian	
National animal/bird		Eagle The eagle is the national and ethnic symbol of the Albanians, considered an animal totem associated with freedom and heroism in their folklore. It has been used as a national symbol since their earliest records, and was a common heraldic symbol for many Albanian dynasties in the Late Middle Ages.

== Unofficial symbols ==
Type	Image	Symbol
National hero		Gjergj Kastrioti
National flower		Red Poppy
National tree		Olive
Patron saint		Our Lady of Good Counsel
National instrument		Çiftelia
National instrument		Lahuta
National clothing		Qeleshe/Plis
National clothing		Opinga
National clothing		Fustanella

== See also ==
- Albanian culture & Albanian people
- List of World Heritage Sites in Albania
