= Ti Shqipëri, më jep nder, më jep emrin Shqipëtar =

National motto of Albania

Ti Shqipëri, më jep nder, më jep emrin Shqipëtar (You Albania, you give me honour, you give me the name Albanian) is the national motto of Albania. The phrase was used in the poem O malet e Shqipërisë (O mountains of Albania), written by Naim Frashëri, proclaimed national poet.

== See also ==
- National symbols of Albania
- Culture of Albania
