= Gjergj =

Gjergj, the Albanian equivalent to the given name George, may refer to:

- Gjergj Arianiti (1383–1462), Albanian lord who led several campaigns against the Ottoman Empire.
- Gjergj Bojaxhi (born 1974), Albanian politician
- Gjergj Bubani (1899–1954), Albanian journalist
- Gjergj Cressiac (fl. 1580), Albanian Epirote chief and commander in service of the Duke of Parma of Spain
- Gjergj Erebara, economic and investigative journalist from Albania.
- Gjergj Fishta (1871–1940), Albanian Franciscan friar, writer, educator, and politician.
- Skanderbeg (Gjergj Kastrioti; 1405–1468), Albanian nobleman and military commander who led a rebellion against the Ottoman Empire.
- Gjergj Topia (died 1392), Prince of Albania, Lord of Durrës
- Gjergj Pekmezi (1872–1938), Albanian linguist, philosopher, folklorist and diplomat
- Gjergj Pelini (died 1463), Catholic priest and diplomat for Skanderbeg and Venice
- Gjergj Schambj, a legendary hero in Bosnia and Herzegovina, Kosovo, and Albania.
- Gjergj Suli (1893–1948), also referred to as At Gjergj Suli was an Albanian Orthodox cleric and martyr.
- Gjergj Qiriazi (1868–1912) was an Albanian patriot, author, educator, translator, Protestant Bible distributor, organizer of the First Congress of Monastir (1908), and activist of the Albanian National Awakening.
- Gjergj Xhuvani (1963–2019), Albanian film director, screenwriter and producer
- Gjergj Zheji (1926–2010), Albanian writer, translator, editor, professor, sequence and folklore researcher

== See also ==
- Gjergji, a given name and surname
