= Traditions of Albania =

Cultural customs of Albanian people

The Traditions of Albania refers to the traditions, beliefs, values and customs that belong within the culture of the Albanian people. Those traditions have influenced daily life in Albania for centuries and are still practiced throughout Albania, Balkans, and Diaspora. The Albanians have a unique culture, which progressed over the centuries through its strategic geography and its distinct historical evolution.

Albania is home to various religious communities such as Muslims, Christians and Jews, and religious tolerance is among the most important values of the Albanian tradition. It is widely accepted, that Albanians are well known for those important values; the peaceful coexistence among the believers of different religions and beliefs in the country.

Albania is a very hospitable culture; hospitality is a fundamental custom of the local society and serving food is integral to the hosting of guests and visitors. It is not infrequent for visitors to be invited to eat and drink with locals. The medieval Albanian code of honor, called Besa, resulted to look after guests and strangers as an act of recognition and gratitude.

== See also ==
- Culture of Albania & Culture of Kosovo
- Albanian people & Albanian diaspora
- Bread and salt
