= Xhamadan =

Traditional garment worn by Albanian men

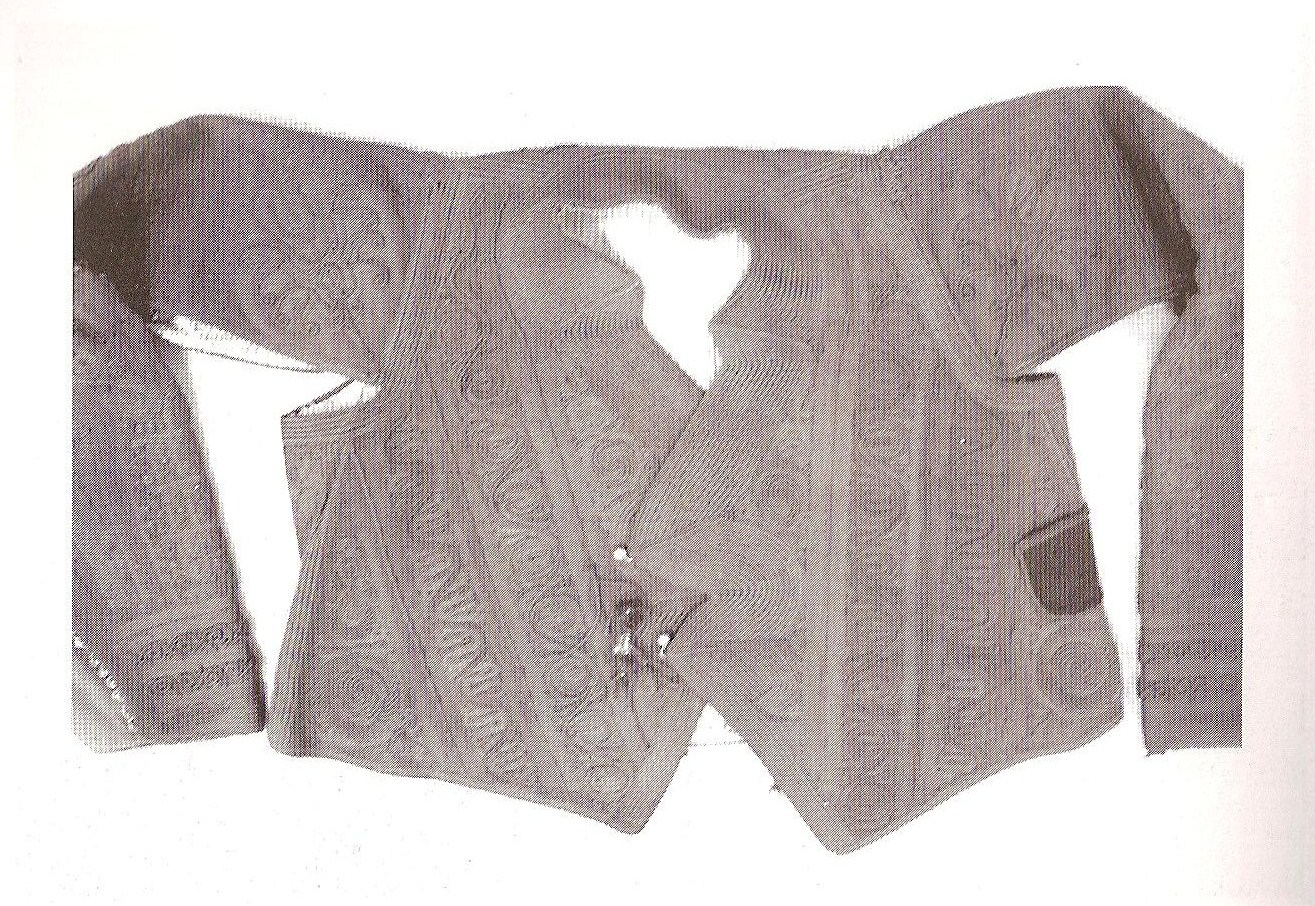
Xhamadan of Isa Boletini, an Albanian freedom fighter of early 20th century

A xhamadan or xhamadani is a traditional wool garment worn by Albanian men. It can be sleeved or sleeveless. The sleeveless xhamadan is only one type of the Albanian vest, the other two being the xhamadani me reshme, and the xhamadani fermele. The xhamadani me reshme went out of use around the beginning of the 20th century. whereas the xhamadan and the xhamadani fermele continue to be used in traditional festivities. A good xhamadan is usually richly embroidered, sometimes in gold: in the past its quality revealed social rank.

== History ==
The xhamadani originated in the northeastern parts of Albania, but is worn throughout the country and in other territories inhabited by Albanians. The xhamadan appears to be the jacket to which 16th-century English poet Edmund Spenser refers in a line of his Faerie Queene, published in the 1590s, where he mentions the sleeves-dependent, Albanese wise. It is mentioned several times by British travel writers, such as John Foster Fraser, who in the first (1906) edition of his book, Pictures from the Balkans, observes the preferences of Albanian men for xhamadans embroidered in gold or silver.

== Types of xhamadan ==
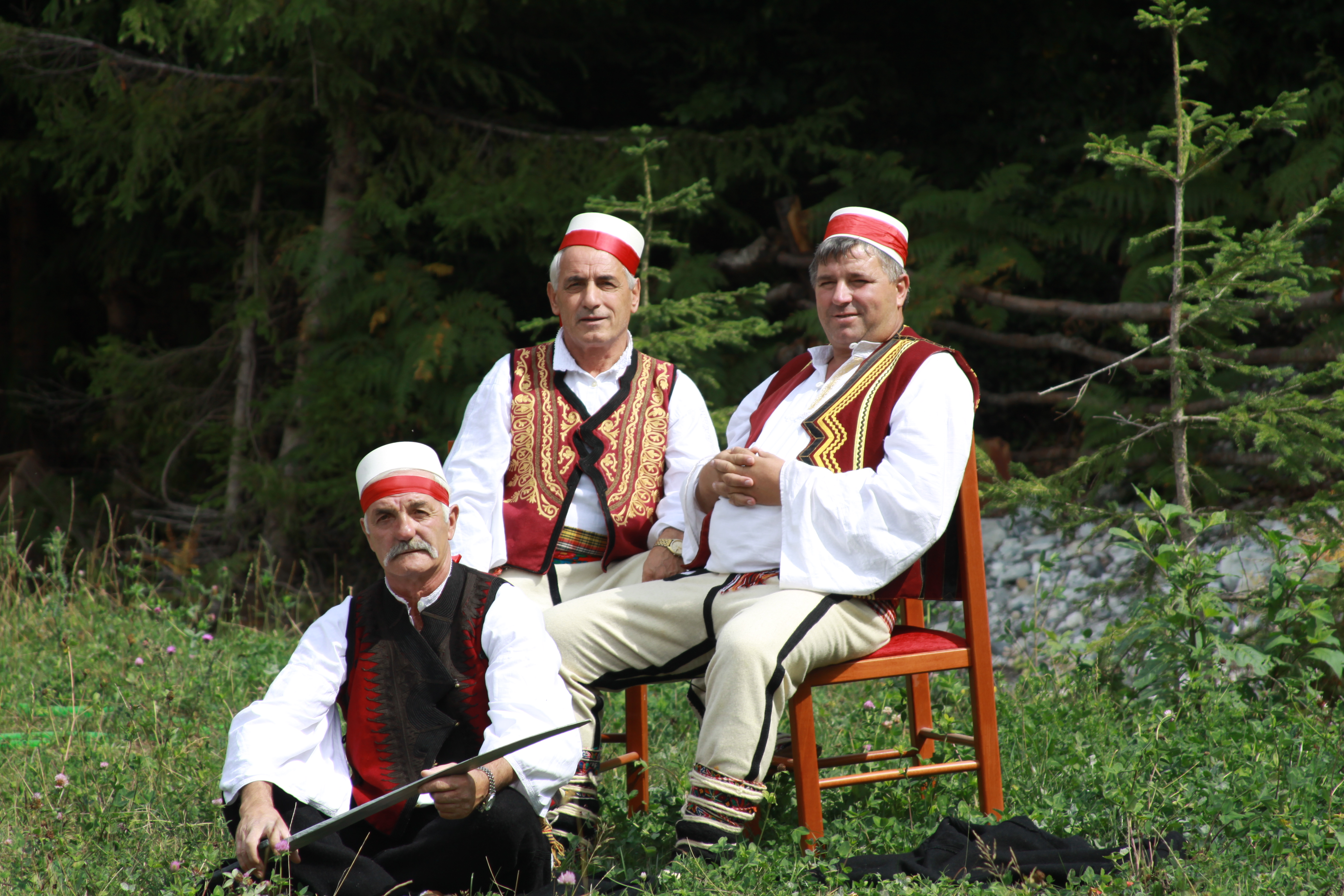
Men from Kukes wearing xhamadan

There were three types of xhamadanis in Albania: the xhamadan, the xhamadani me reshme and the xhamadani fermele, of which only the fermele and xhamadan are still in use, the jermele having fallen out of favour around the beginning of the 20th century.

The xhamadan usually can be closed on the left side, it has usually two pockets, an outside and an inside one, and is adorned with embroidery. In winter time the Albanians would wear the tallagan, a heavy coat, on top of the xhamadan. The embroidery can be in silk or cotton braids.

Northern and southern Albanians each had several types of xhamadan, which differed in color and cut. Northern Albanians would usually wear a xhamadan of red velvet, embroidered in black silk or, sometimes, gold. The quality of the embroidery itself indicates social rank. In particular, the xhamadan worn by Albanians in the region of Tetovo (now North Macedonia), is white, or creamy, and richly embroidered. It is sleeveless, and open on the chest, but it can be closed, with special fastenings. It has been a tradition that the bridegroom would wear it on his wedding day. The southern Albanian version of the xhamadan for men is no longer red like the northern one, but creamy or dark blue.

The northern Albanian xhamadan would usually have one pocket for the pocketwatch, or two, if the watch had a chain. In southern Albania the chain would be worn diagonally, instead.

== Trivia ==
The song "Xhamadani vija vija" (English: "Striped xhamadan"), composed in 1993 by Zef Çoba, refers to the xhamadan, and envisions the union of Albania and Kosovo, united under a common vest.

== See also ==
- Culture of Albania
- Qeleshe
- Opinga
- Albanian traditional clothing

== Sources ==
- Berisha, Anton (1973), Kosovo nekad i danas: Kosova dikur e sot, Borba,"-Radna jedinica "Ekonomska politika,"
- Blumi, Isa (10 May 2011), Reinstating the Ottomans: Alternative Balkan Modernities, 1800-1912, Palgrave Macmillan, ISBN 978-0-230-11908-6
- Condra, Jill (9 April 2013), Encyclopedia of National Dress: Traditional Clothing Around the World, ABC-CLIO, ISBN 978-0-313-37637-5
- Consociazione Turistica Italiana (1997), Albania Guide Rosse, Touring Editore, ISBN 978-88-365-1148-8
- Gjergji, Andromaqi (2002), Albanian Costumes Through the Centuries: Origin, Types, Evolution, Acad. of Sciences of Albania, Inst. of Folc Culture, ISBN 978-99943-614-4-1
- Gjergji, Andromaqi (1988), Veshjet Shqiptare në Shekuj: Origjina Tipologjia Zhvillimi, Akademia e Shkencave të RPS të Shqipërisë, Instituti i Kulturës Popullore
- Gjergji, Andromaqi (1976), Etnografia shqiptare, vol. 7–8, Akademia e Shkencave e RPSH, Instituti i Historisë, Sektori i Etnografisë
- Museo nazionale della montagna "Duca degli Abruzzi" (2000), Argjënd: maestri argentieri in Albania e Kosovo, Museo nazionale della montagna "Duca degli Abruzzi"
- Sulejmani, Fadil (1988), Lindja, martesa dhe mortja në malësitë e Tetovës, Rilindja
- Turino, Thomas (2004), Identity and the Arts in Diaspora Communities, Information Coordinators, Incorporated, ISBN 978-0-89990-124-4
