= Andromaqi Gjergji =

Albanian ethnologist (1928–2015)

- Born: 20 May 1928; Korçë, Albanian Republic
- Died: 8 July 2015 (aged 87); Tirana, Albania

Andromaqi Gjergji (20 May 1928 – 8 July 2015) was an Albanian ethnologist who was a specialist in Albanian costumes and dress.

== Life ==
Gjergji was born in Korçë in 1928. She studied history and philology at the Albanian capital of Tirana. She has published widely about Albanian culture. She became a professor at the Institute of Folk Culture in 1993. She had over 130 publications about Albanian dress. Albanian Costumes through the Centuries was published in 2004.

She reported that the earliest archaeological evidence for Albanian Opinga shoes are from the 5-4th century BC indicating they were an element in Illyrian culture.

Gjergji died in Tirana in 2015.

== Works include ==
- Gjergji, Andromaqi (2002), Albanian Costumes Through the Centuries: Origin, Types, Evolution, Acad. of Sciences of Albania, Inst. of Folk Culture, ISBN 978-99943-614-4-1
- Gjergji, Andromaqi (1988), Veshjet Shqiptare në Shekuj: Origjina Tipologjia Zhvillimi, Akademia e Shkencave të RPS të Shqipërisë, Instituti i Kulturës Popullore
- Gjergji, Andromaqi (1976), Etnografia shqiptare, vol. 7–8, Akademia e Shkencave e RPSH, Instituti i Historisë, Sektori i Etnografisë
