= Matilda Gjergji =

Albanian footballer

Personal information
- Date of birth: 21 May 2003 (age 23)
- Place of birth: Shkodër, Albania
- Position: Defender

Team information
- Current team: Vllaznia

Senior career*
Years	Team	Apps	(Gls)
2017–	Vllaznia		

International career^{‡}
2021–	Albania	3	(0)
- * Club domestic league appearances and goals ‡ National team caps and goals as of 11:18, 18 February 2023 (UTC)

Matilda Gjergji (born 21 May 2003) is an Albanian footballer who plays as a defender for Vllaznia and the Albania national team.

== International career ==
Gjergji made her debut for the Albania national team on 25 November 2021, coming on as a substitute for Mimoza Hamidi against Norway.

== Personal life ==
Gjergji cites fellow Vllaznia footballer Arbiona Bajraktari as an influence on her football career.
