= Qeleshe =

White brimless felt cap traditionally worn by Albanians

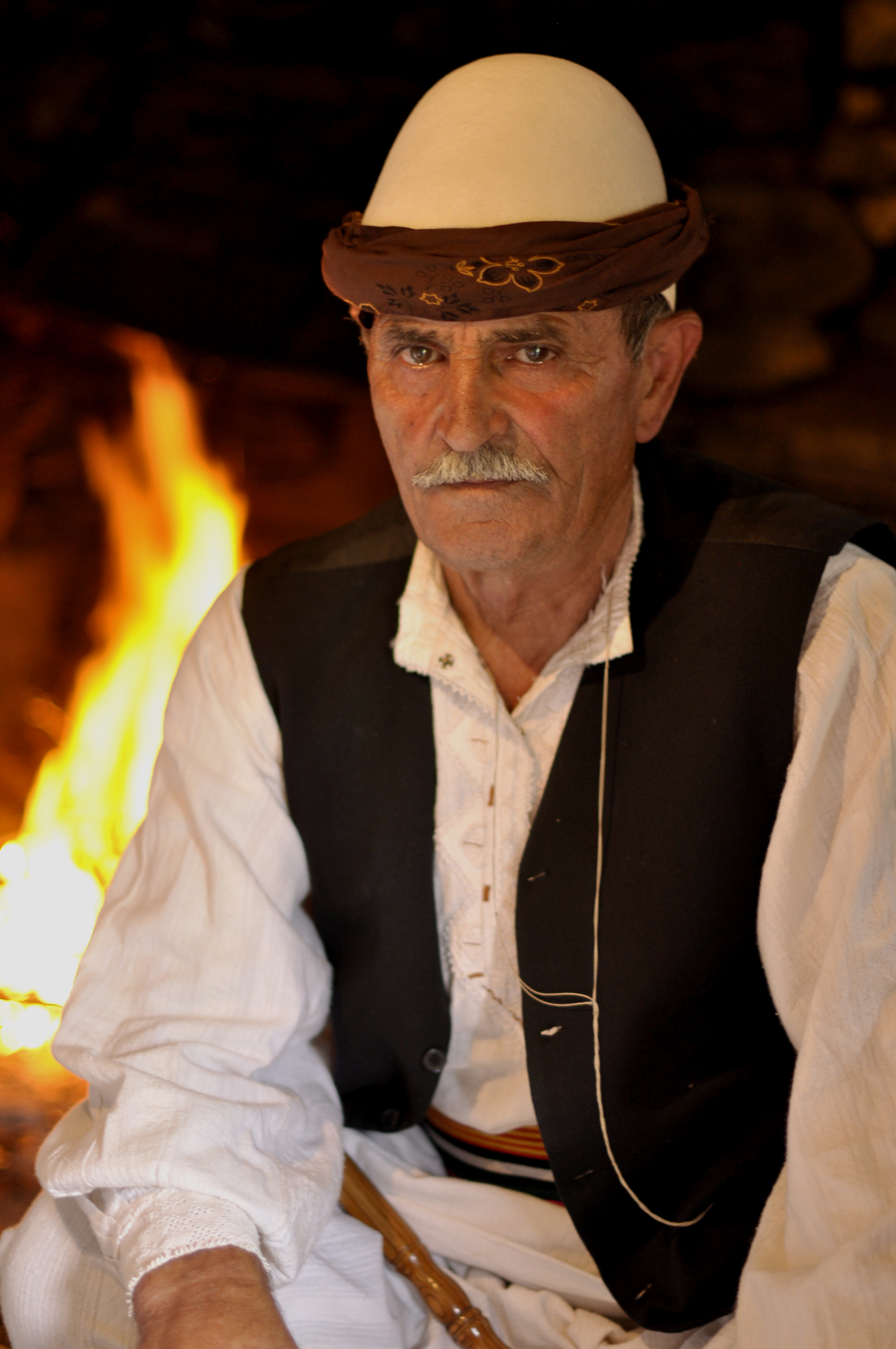
Old man of Has of Prizren wearing a qeleshe

The qeleshe, also known as plis and qylaf, is a white brimless felt skull cap traditionally worn by Albanians. It has spread throughout Albanian-inhabited territories, and is today part of the traditional costume of the Albanians. The height and shape of the cap varies region to region.

== Etymology ==
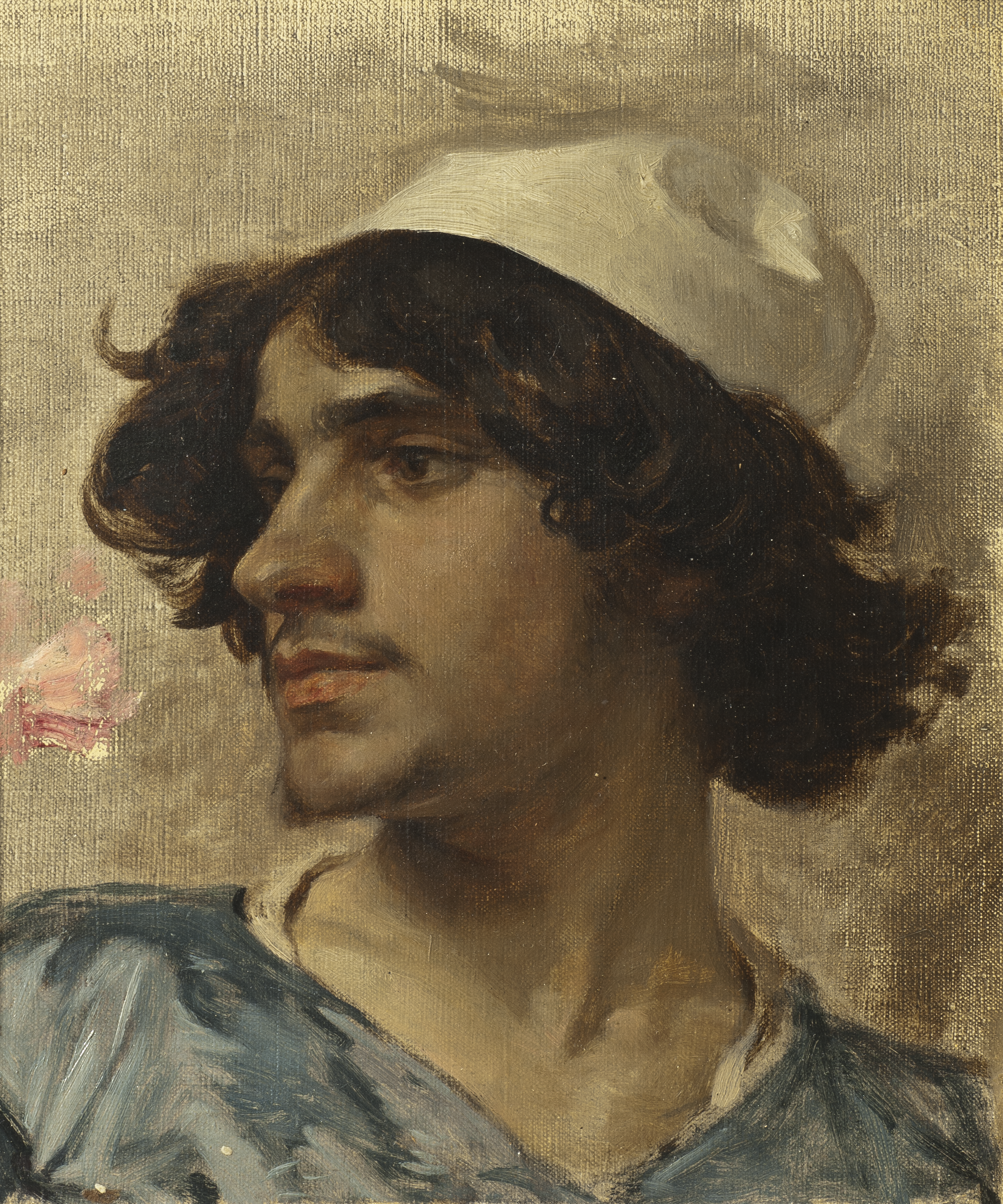
Portrait of a young Albanian soldier wearing a qeleshe. Oil on canvas by Charles Bargue (1826–1883).

In Albanian: def. sin. qeleshja or plisi, indef. pl. qeleshe or plisa, def. pl. qeleshet or plisat.

The word qeleshe comes from the Albanian word for wool (lesh). According to Vladimir Orel, the word plis comes from Proto-Albanian *p(i)litja, related to Old High German filiz id., Latin pellis id. and Greek πῖλος pilos id., Proto-Slavic *pьlstь id.; according to Michael Driesen, Orel's reconstruction of Proto-Albanian *p(i)litja is incorrect.

== Process ==
There are many ways to make the qeleshe but it is always hand made. The most common way, in Kosovo, is using soap on the wool. In the bazaar of Krujë, it is constructed by first getting a small chunk of wool that is placed on a table. Then, an instrument similar to a bow is used to beat the wool by hammering the string with a stone or a sturdy piece of wood. The wool is beaten and pressed until the wool strands become knotted around each other. Finally, it is washed, and shrinks.

It is then pressed by a flat wooden instrument on top of it, multiple times, until the wool becomes completely flat and smooth. Then, it is sealed in a flattener for 24 hours and soaked in hot water and salt. The hat is made by two finished, flattened and pressed wool. The corners are removed to form a round shape. Afterwards, soap is added as a glue substitution to finely keep the fibres smooth while both pieces of wool are rubbed together. Then it is washed and beaten to strengthen the fabric, and placed on a wooden model. The shape of the qeleshe is determined by the wooden model on which it is left to dry, and then rubbed with soap again to fix the shape. The wool will be smoothened with a razor. Lastly, a wooden instrument is firmly rubbed on the qeleshe.

== History ==
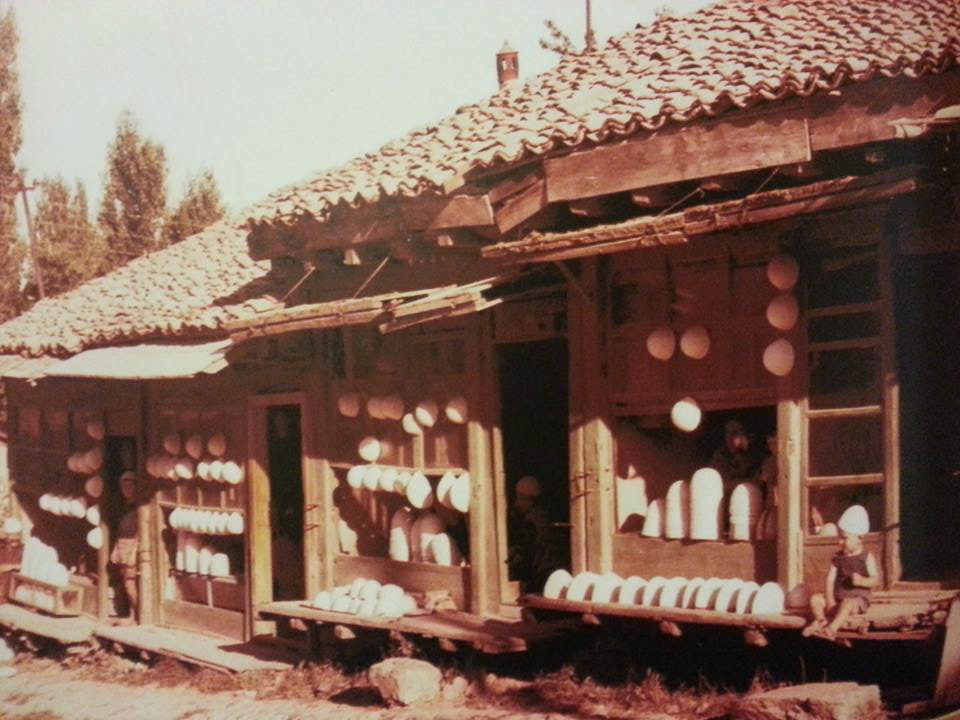
Albanian qeleshe shop in the Old Bazaar - Gjakova, 1936

The Albanian qeleshe has been handed down from Illyrian times.

The Illyrian hemispherical cap dates from the Iron Age, found both in men's and women's graves, hence it can be assumed that it was worn both by men and women. A monument from Illyrian times that was found in Zenica shows a calotte-shaped cap, very similar to the qeleshe. The Albanian/Illyrian cap has been classified in a broader and general Mediterranean framework, relying on illustrations on situlae and girdle plates from the later Iron Age in Northern Italy and the Southern Alps. They also feature figures with hemispherical headgear with a small spike. The wearers of such caps are depicted carrying agricultural tools which leads to consider them as country people. Furthermore, in monuments from the 2nd and 3rd centuries AD from Bosnia, Illyrians under Roman rule are depicted with similar cap shapes. Such caps are absent in the eastern half of the Balkans, in the Pannonian-Carpathian region and in eastern Europe.

In 1322, the Irish Franciscan friar Simon Fitzsimons (Symon Semeonis) passed through the western Balkans, including the port city of Durrës (Dyrrachium), during his pilgrimage to the Holy Land. In his Latin travelogue, ltinerarium Symonis Semeonis ab Hybernia ad Terram Sanctam, he recorded detailed observations of the local populations. Fitzsimons explicitly noted that the Albanians possessed a distinct language and distinguished them from neighboring groups by their attire.

He wrote that, like the Greeks, they rarely wore cowls, but instead wore a "white hat, lowered almost flat to the front and raised at the back" (capello albo quasi plano in parte anteriori humiliato et in posteriori elevato), which allowed them to display their long hair. Fitzsimons contrasted this specific silhouette with the attire of the neighboring Slavs (Sclavi), whom he noted wore a "white hat, oblong and round" (capello albo, oblongo et rotundo) adorned with a feather for nobles.

The 1542 Latin dictionary De re vestiaria libellus, ex Bayfio excerptus equated an Albanian hat with a kyrbasia, and described it as a "tall pileus [hat] in the shape of a cone" (pileus altus in speciem coni eductus). An early depiction of the hemispherical qeleshe can be seen on Johann Theodor de Bry depiction of Moisi Golemi from 1596, however, earlier Italian and documents exist depicting Albanians wearing the qeleshe from earlier centuries. It is also argued by Nopcsa that it may have been coloured red. During the 17-19 centuries, the appearances description and appearances steadily multiplied, depicting it as a common Albanian headdress as it became more widespread and easily accessible to wear. The white version became the most popular one and was finally declared a specific Albanian national costume during the Albanian Renaissance.

In his 1689 encyclopedic work Lexicon Universale, the Swiss scholar Johann Jacob Hofmann noted the traditional conical cap, comparing it to the ancient Greek cyrbasia and the apex worn by Roman Salii priests, stating that it was "otherwise called the Epirote or Albanian cap"(Pileus Epiroticus seu Albanus).

In the 18-19 century, the qeleshe became popularly depicted in painting depicting Arnaut, painters like Jean-Léon Gérôme, Charles Bargue and Marie-Gabriel-Florent-Auguste de Choiseul-Gouffier would paint Albanian subjects of the Osman Empire with the qeleshe, as a diverse presentation of the orient. It would be casually depicted in a formal setting, such as in The Albanian Marriage by Jean Pierre Louis Laurent Hoüel in 1785, where the priest is depicted with a qeleshe.

During the 19-20 century, Albanologists started taking photographs of Albanian national attires, many of which would include the qeleshe. Franz Nopcsa von Felső-Szilvás is photographed multiple times wearing the headdress. It then became a popular headdress for Albanian soldiers to wear during the battle for independence, Shota Galica, Isa Boletini and Azem Galica are depicted wearing the qeleshe while fighting Italian, Turkish, Greek, Serbian and Montenegrin troops during the Partition of Albania. The qeleshe formed part of the official uniform of the Waffen-SS Skanderbeg division and Albanian Legion.

== Overview ==
The cap is part of the traditional costume of the Albanian highlanders and is considered as a national symbol among a large number of Albanian communities. During the Ottoman period, the hat as a white colored fez cap was the characteristic Albanian national headgear, in particular of Muslim Albanians.

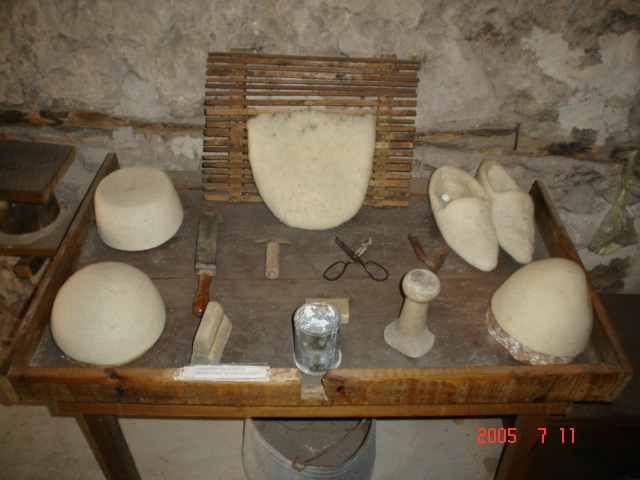
Wool products at the Kruja Ethnographic Museum.

In the northern Albanian highlands, the shape is hemispherical, while in Kukës, it is truncated. In southern Albania, the cap is taller than in northern Albania, especially in the Gjirokastër and Vlorë regions, with the exception of the Myzeqe low plains region. In some areas of southern Albania the cap has a small protrusion. The cap is made from one single piece of woolen felt, usually white, that is molded to the shape of the head.

The cap is used by men during the traditional weddings of the Tirana region.

== Gallery ==
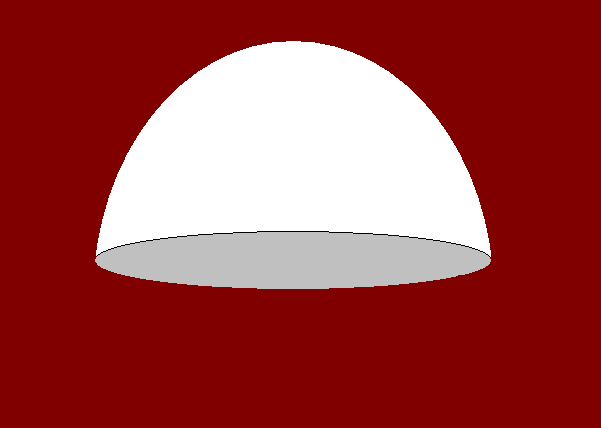
Hemispherical type qeleshe.

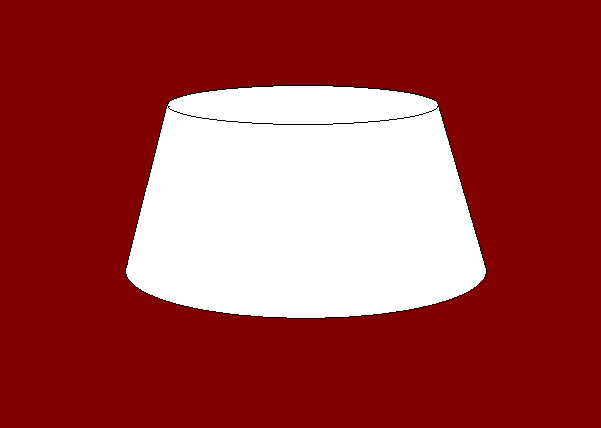
Flat-topped fez type qeleshe.

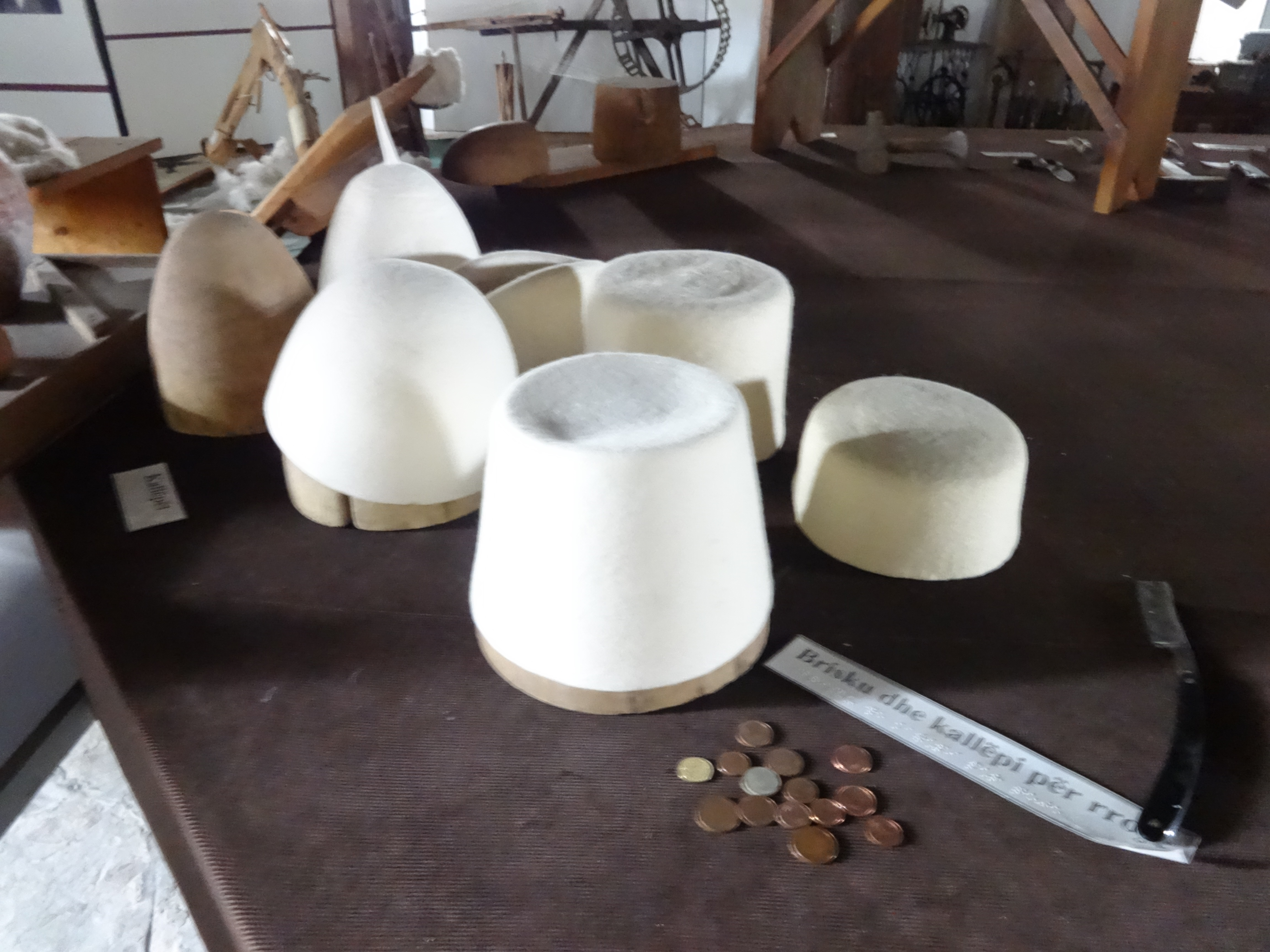
Hemispherical, oval and flat topped shapes of qeleshe.

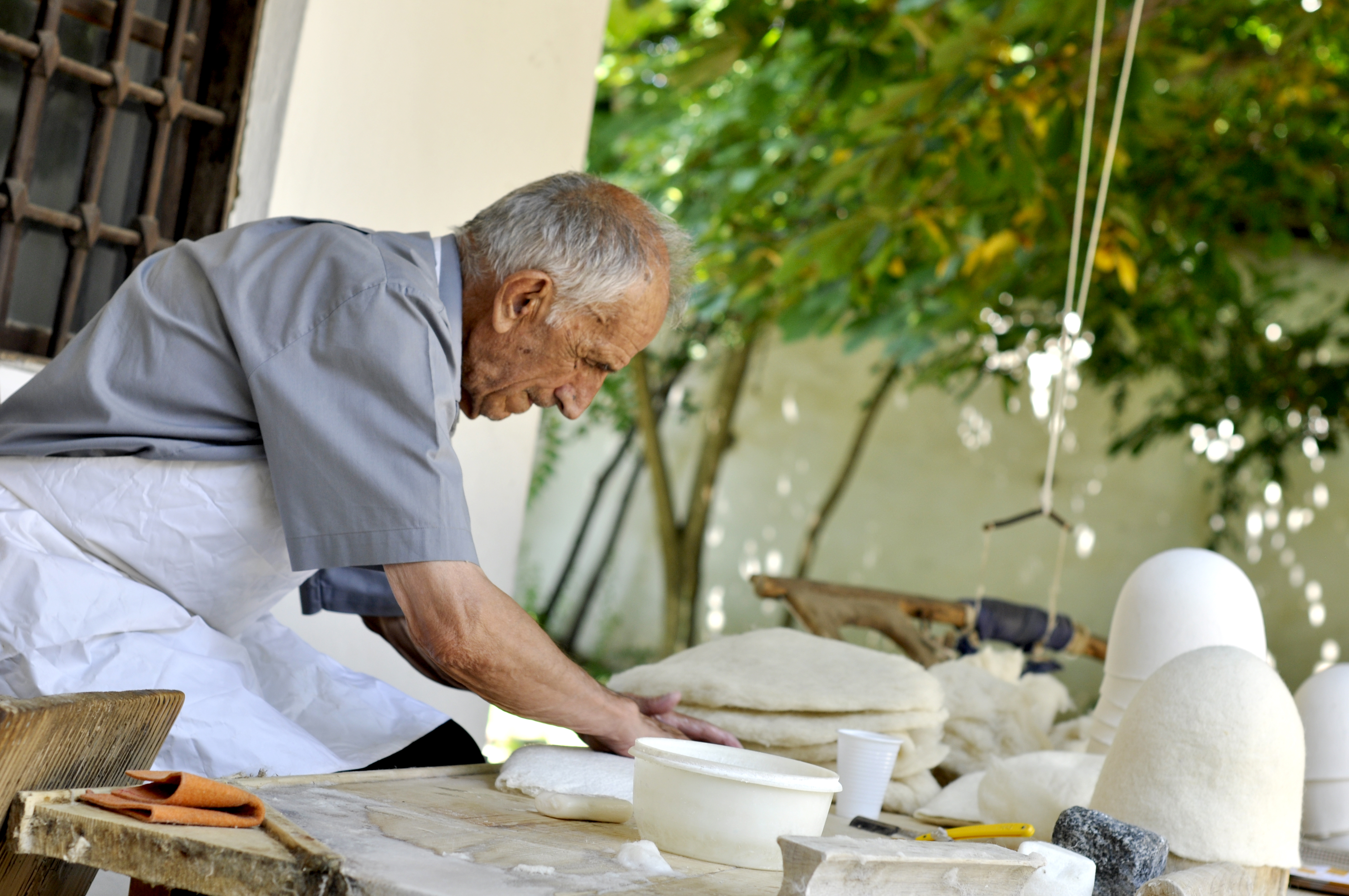
A felt-maker.

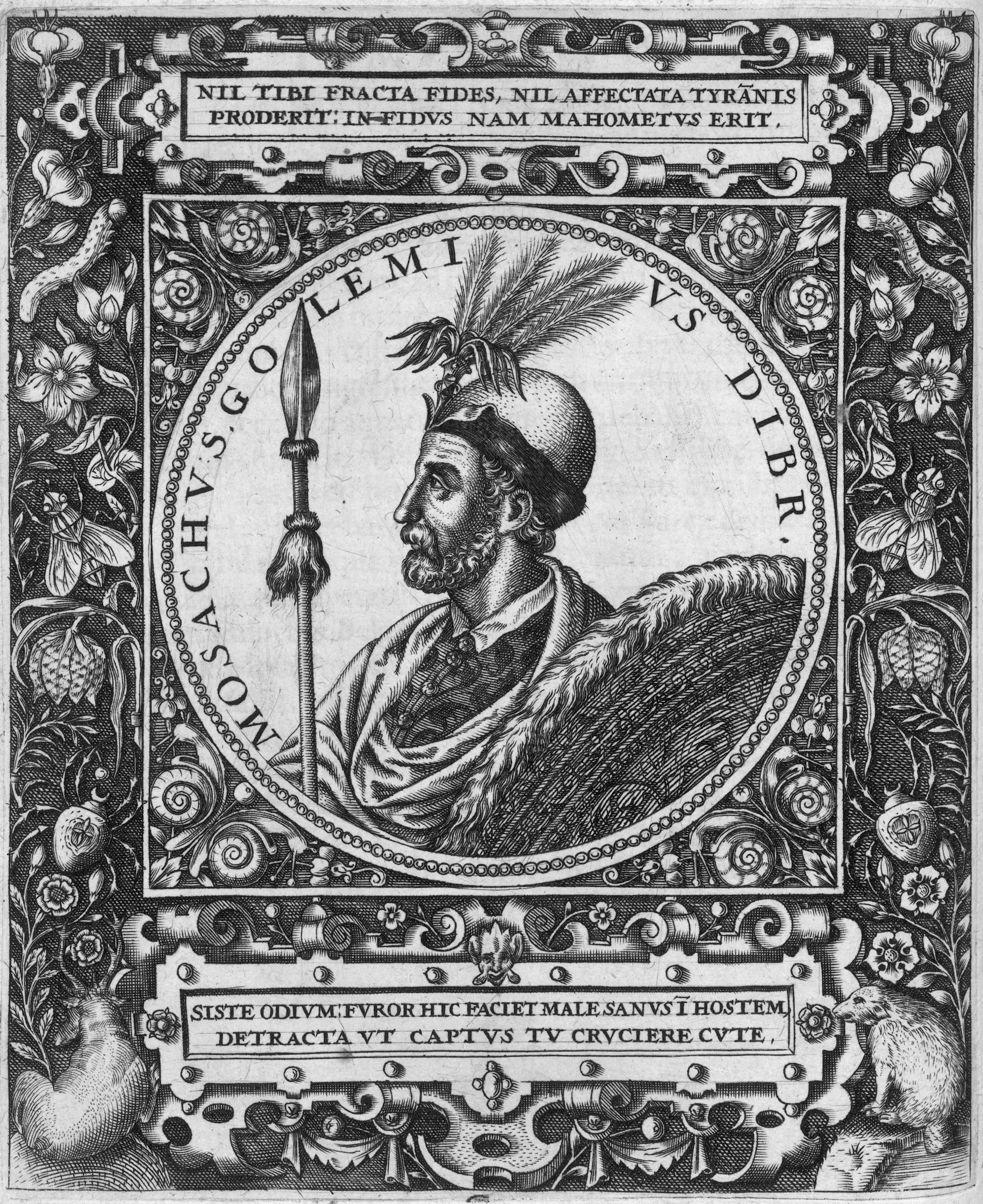
Moisi Golemi, engraving by Johann Theodor de Bry, 1596.

Albanian music trio with hemispherical type qeleshe, Has District.

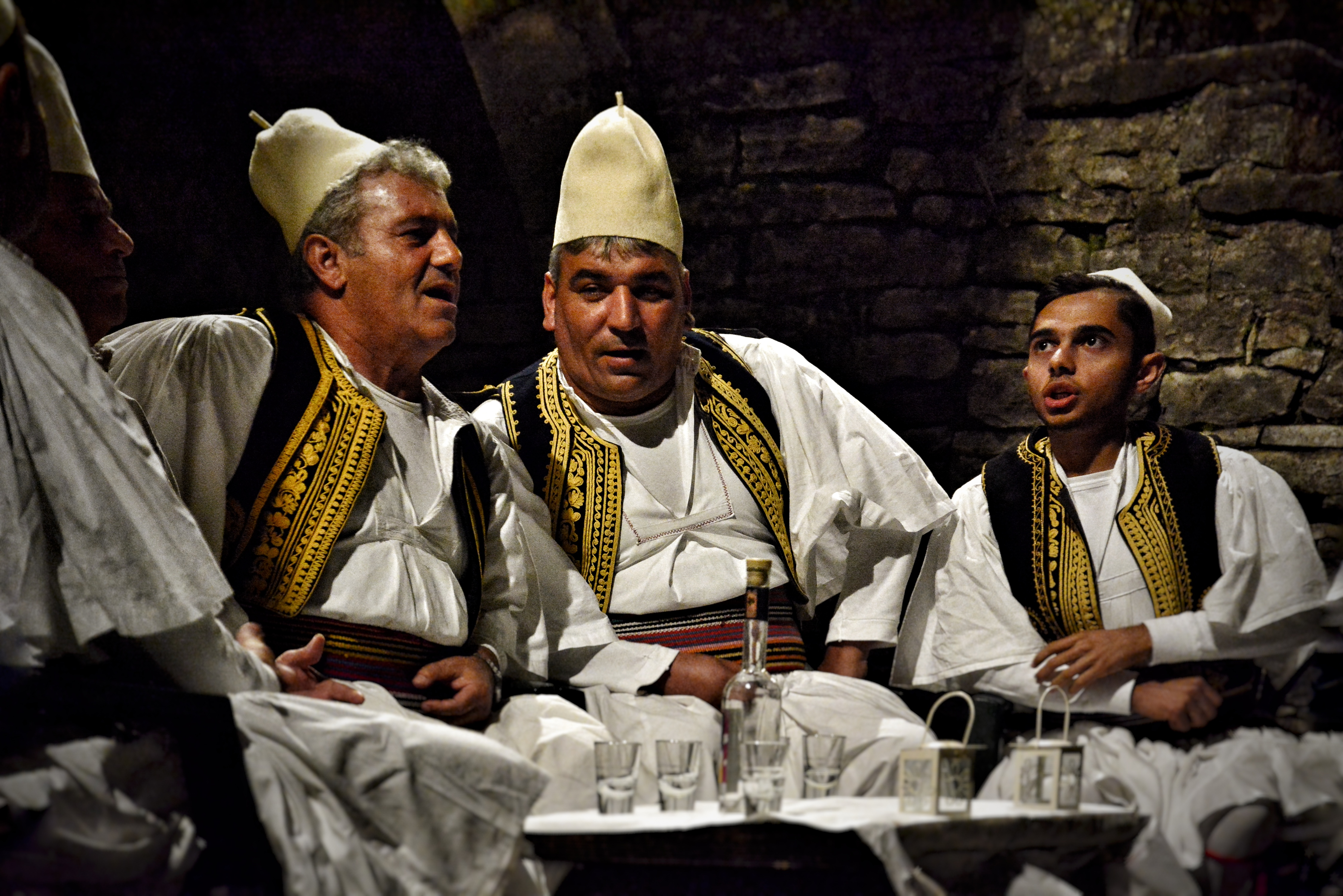
Iso-polyphony ensemble Grupi Argjiro wearing tall qeleshes with a small protrusion on the top, Gjirokastër

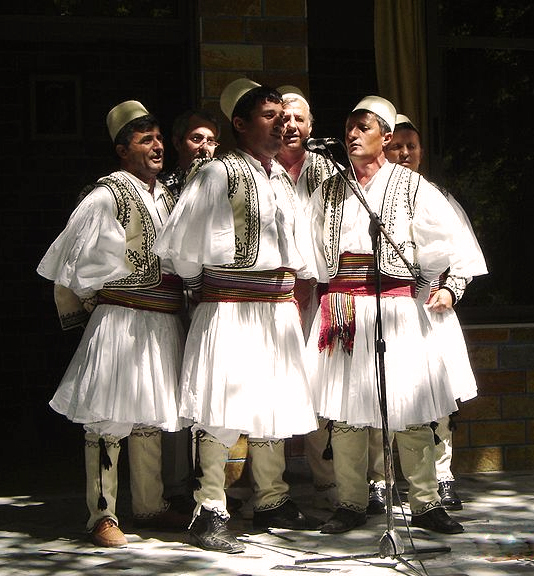
Albanian singers with flat-topped type qeleshe, Skrapar.

== See also ==
- Culture of Albania
- List of hat styles
- List of headgear
- Pileus
- Opinga
- Traditional clothing of Kosovo

== Bibliography ==
- Bernis, Carmen (1972). "Échanges pendant la Renaissance entre les modes espagnoles et les modes de l'Europe centrale et orientale (hongroise, albanaise et turque)". In Rósza, György (ed.). Actes du XXIIe Congrés International d'Histoire de l'Art, Budapest, 1969: Évolution générale et développements régionaux en histoire de l'art (in French). Vol. 1. Akadémiai Kiadó. p. 706.
- Kane, Robert B. (2014). "Skanderbeg SS Division". In Hall, Richard C. (ed.). War in the Balkans: An Encyclopedic History from the Fall of the Ottoman Empire to the Breakup of Yugoslavia. Santa Barbara, California: ABC-CLIO. ISBN 978-1-61069-031-7.
- Schubert, Gabriella (1993). Kleidung als Zeichen: Kopfbedeckungen im Donau-Balkan-Raum. Harrassowitz. ISBN 9783447034050.
- Stipčević, Aleksandar (1977). The Illyrians: History and Culture. History and Culture Series. Noyes Press. ISBN 0815550529.
- Thomas, Nigel; Babac, Dusan (2012). Armies in the Balkans - 1914-18. United Kingdom: Bloomsbury Publishing. ISBN 9781780967356.
