= Opinga =

Traditional Albanian shoes

Opinga (Gheg Albanian: Apânga) are traditional shoes worn by Albanians in Albania, Kosovo, North Macedonia (opinci), Montenegro, Greece (by the Klephts), and the Arbëresh villages of Italy.

They are made of a single leather skin, formed to the feet with leather or wool strips. A southern Albanian variety of opinga are the typical turned up leather shoes with red and black wool pompoms on the ends, which are often used for folk dances.

== Etymology ==
According to the most recent statement on Albanology by Matzinger, the word "opingë" derives from Proto-Albanian "*api + *ga", *api also giving rise to hap (“step”). Related to hap (“open”).

Similarly named traditional shoes are opinca in Romania, opanak in Serbia, Croatia, Bosnia and Herzegovina, opinka in Bulgaria, and elsewhere.

== History ==
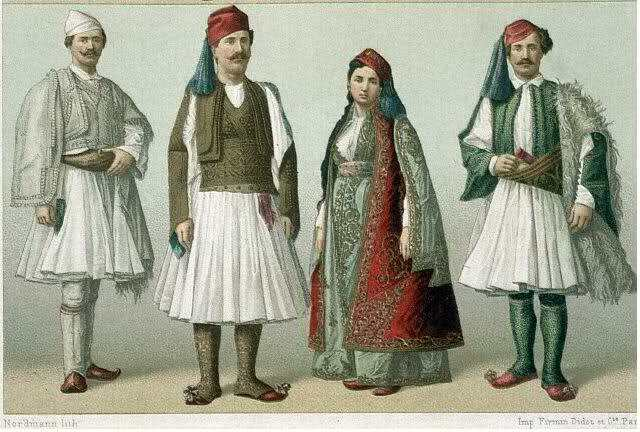
A group of upper-class Albanians wearing different types of opinga (19th century)

The earliest archaeological evidence for opinga dates back to the 5-4th centuries BC, indicating they were an element in Illyrian culture. Later evidence of their use in Albania is apparent in the works of the 16th century iconographic painter Onufri.

It has been suggested that the etymology of the word comes from Proto-Albanian *api (modern Albanian: hapi), meaning "step".

In 1610, Marino Bizzi, a Venetian patrician in Dalmatia and Archbishop of Antivari, noted that the men of Mirdita wore opinga, made of cow skin, prepared by the men themselves.

The artisans of the kaza of Përmet held the monopoly in the trade of opinga in the vilayets of Shkodër and Janina until 1841, when that privilege was revoked under the Tanzimat reforms.

== See also ==
- Opanak
- Culture of Albania
- Albanian traditional clothing
- Qeleshe
- Xhamadan
