= National Museum of Medieval Art (Albania) =

- Muzeu Kombëtar i Artit Mesjetar
- Official logo

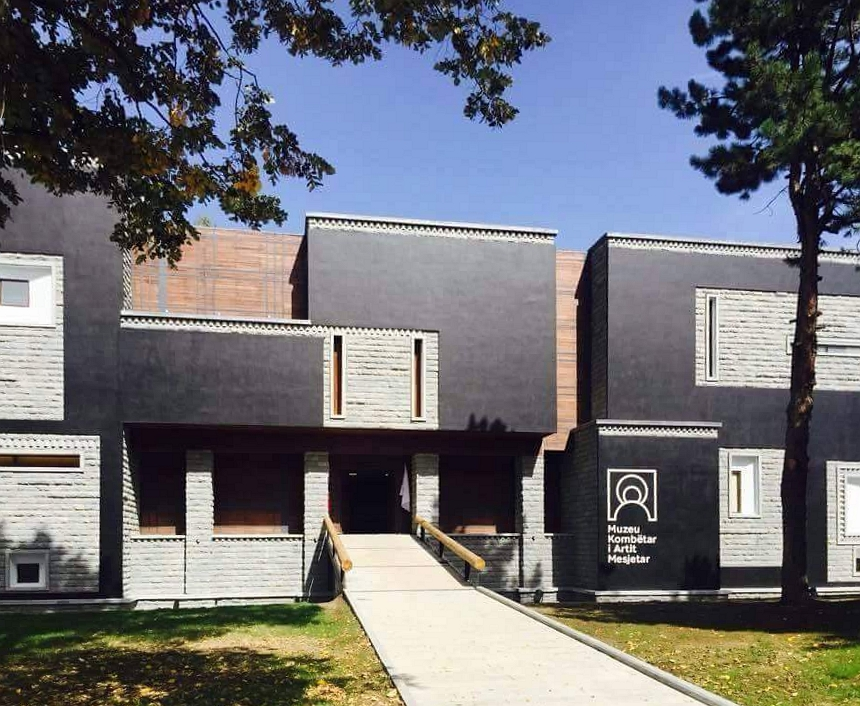
- View of National Museum of Medieval Art
- Established: 14 May 1979; 47 years ago
- Location: Korçë, Albania
- Type: Art museum
- Key holdings: Medieval period
- Collections: Medieval art
- Collection size: over 6.500 icons
- Director: Lorenc Glozheni
- Website: muzeumesjetar.gov.al

The National Museum of Medieval Art (Albanian: Muzeu Kombëtar i Artit Mesjetar) is a national museum dedicated to medieval art and history in Korçë, Albania. The museum is located on Fan Noli Boulevard in the south-east of the city of Korçë. It was established on April 24, 1980, and the building was reconstructed on October 4, 2016, with the cooperation of the city municipality and the Greek Government fund.

The museum has over 7,000 art and cultural items, mainly icons, stone, wooden, metal and textile works, representing various moments in Albania's iconography development. In the principal hall, there are many works from anonymous artists of the 13th-14th centuries and well-known ones including Onufri, Onufër Qiprioti, Teacher Kostandini, Jeromak Shpataraku, David Selenica, and the Zografi Brothers.

Due to the COVID-19 lockdown in Albania, the Ministry of Culture offers 3D tours of the museum.

== Gallery ==
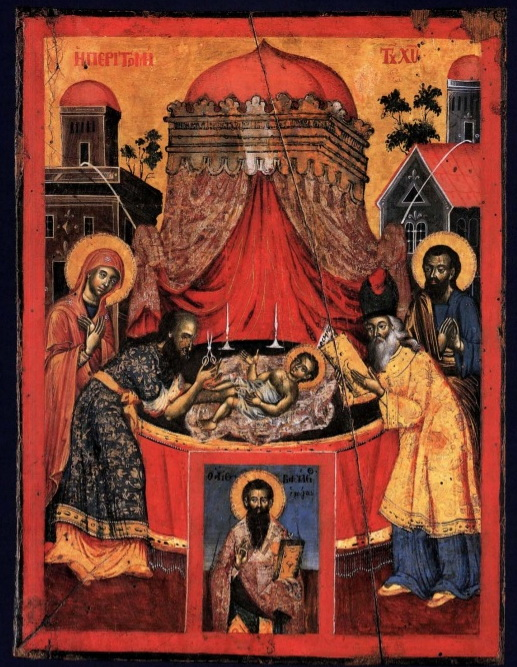

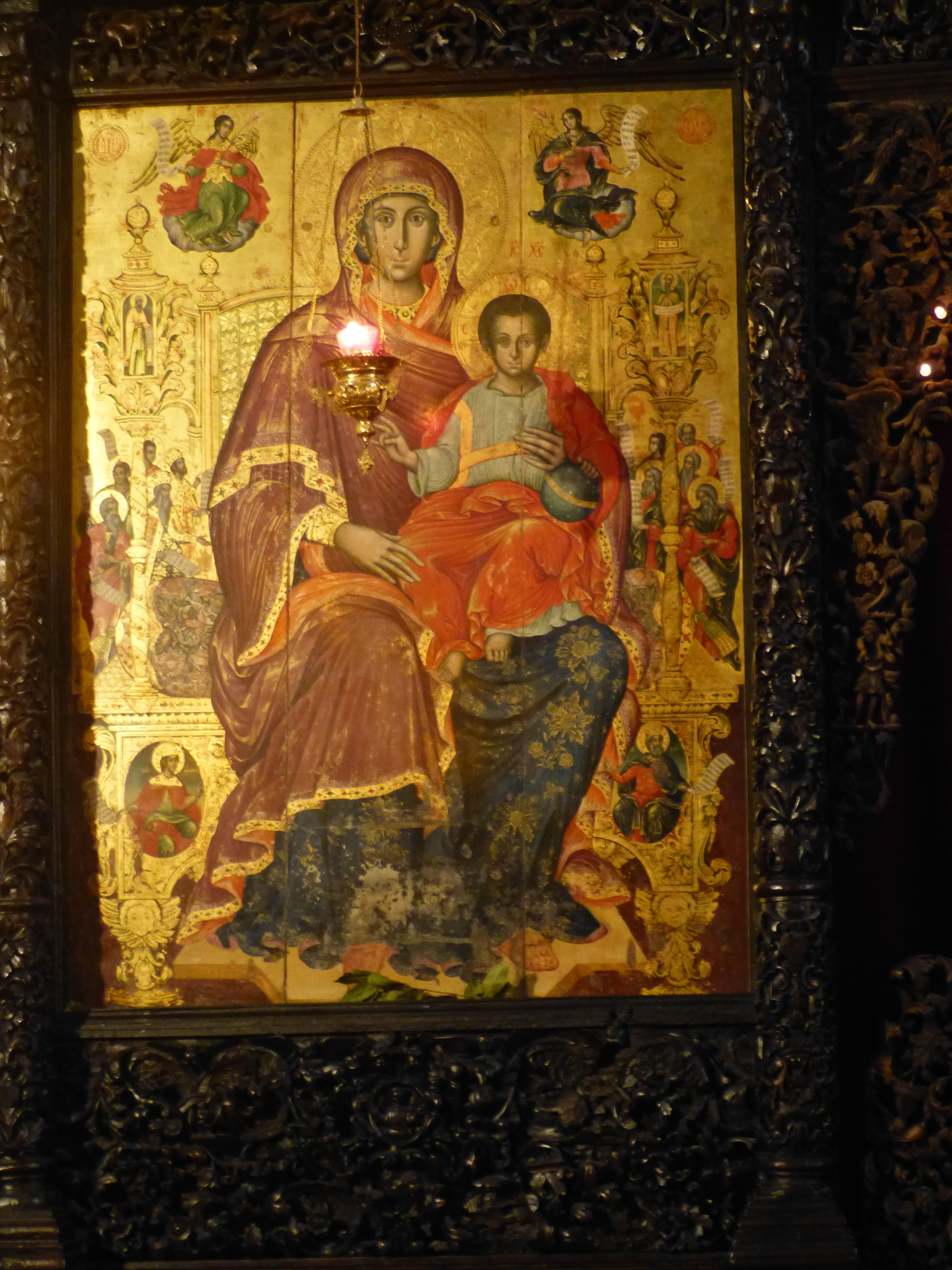

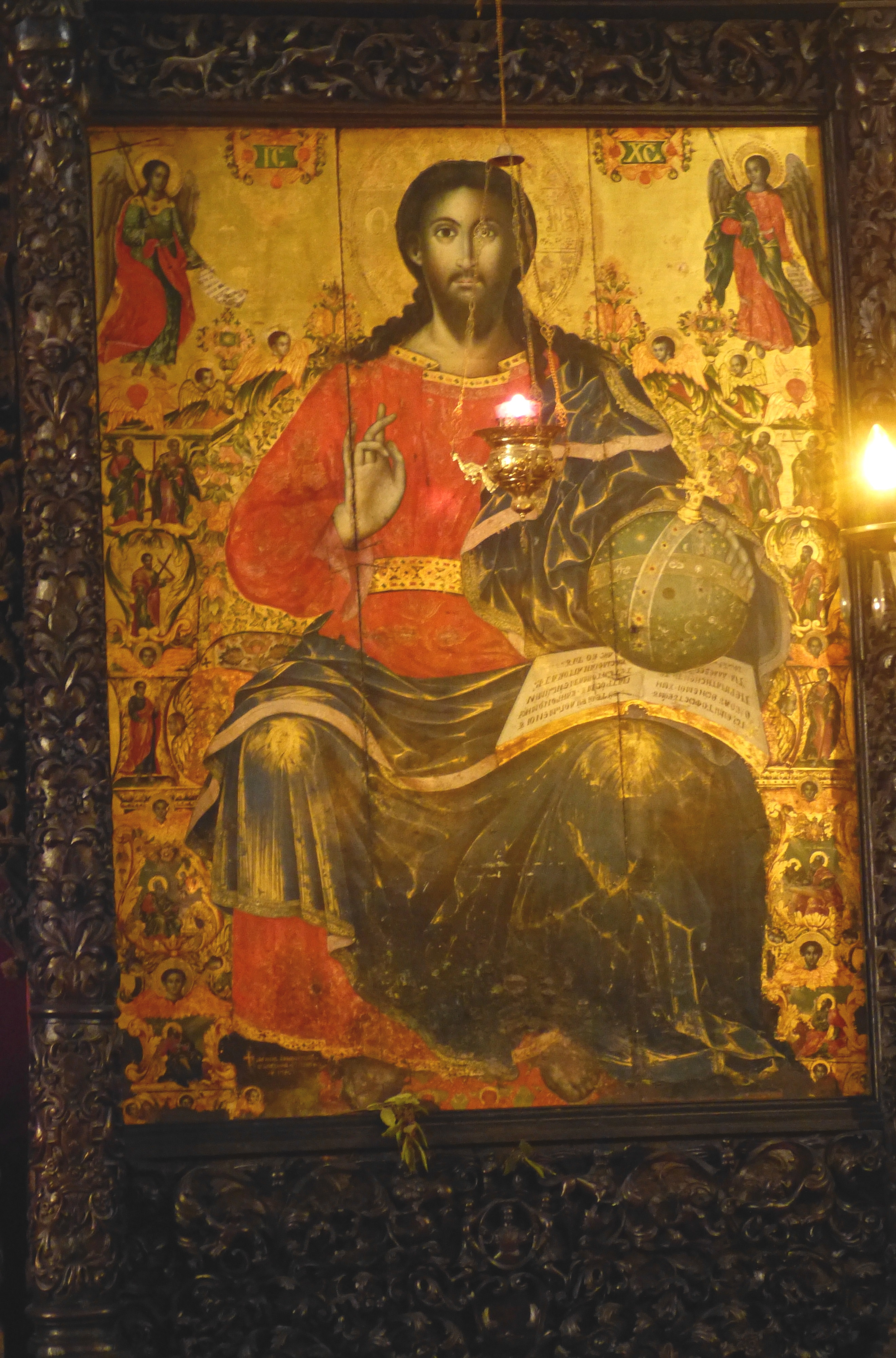

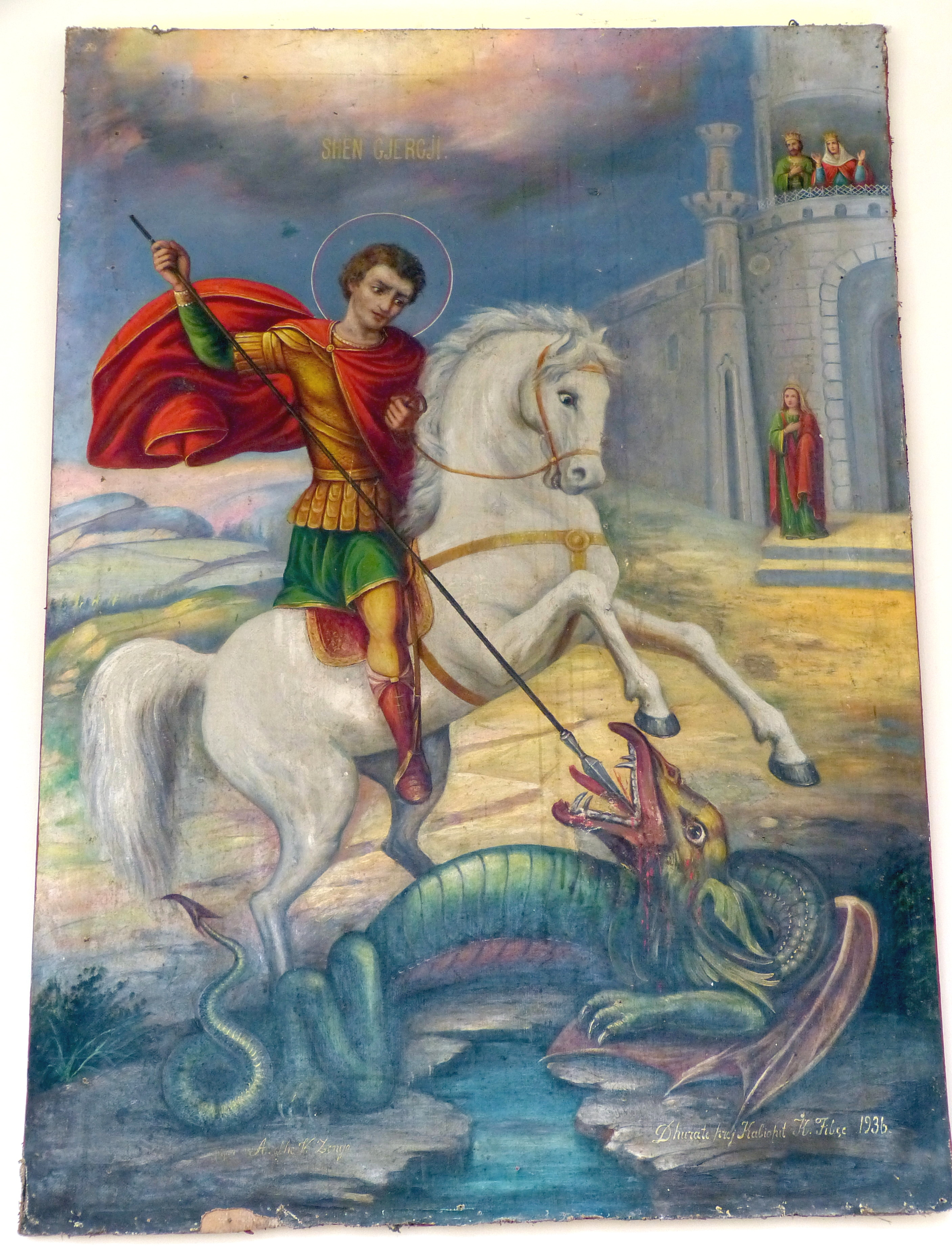

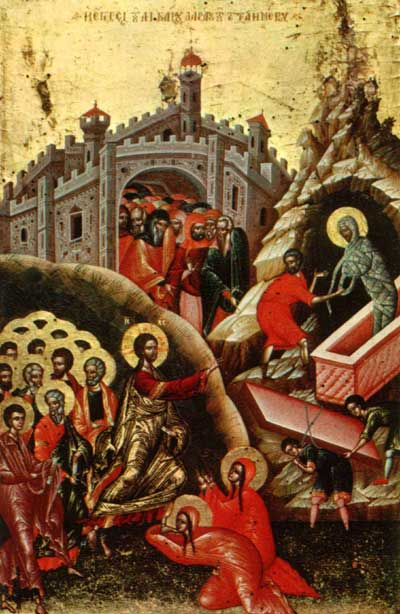
"The Resurrection of Lazarus." Byzantine icon painted by Onufri (Onouphrios). 16th century.

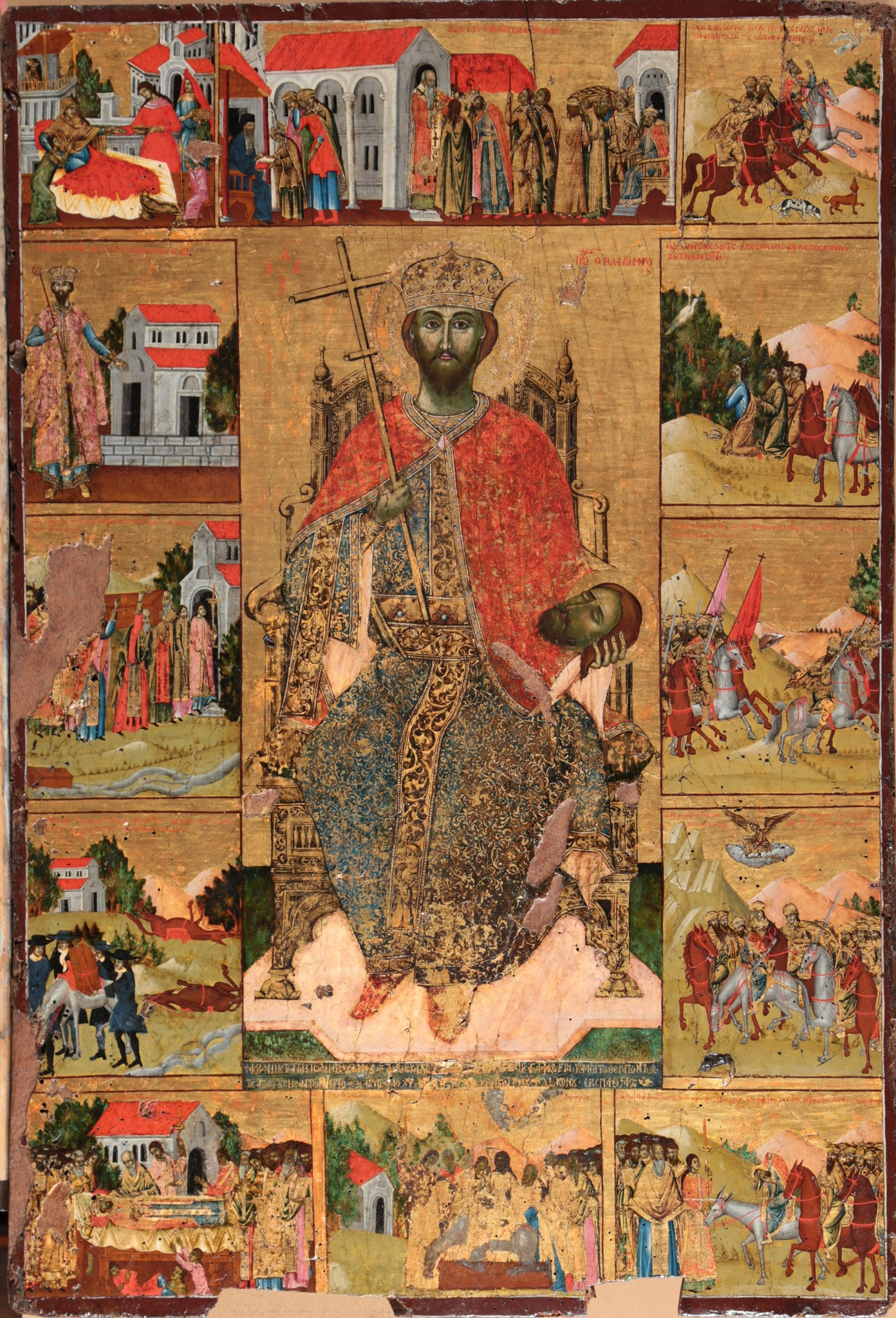
Icon of Saint Jovan Vladimir painted by Kostandin Shpataraku, from the Ardenica Monastery in Albania. The saint is depicted as sitting on a throne in the central rectangle, surrounded by scenes of his life and miracles, according to his Greek hagiography.

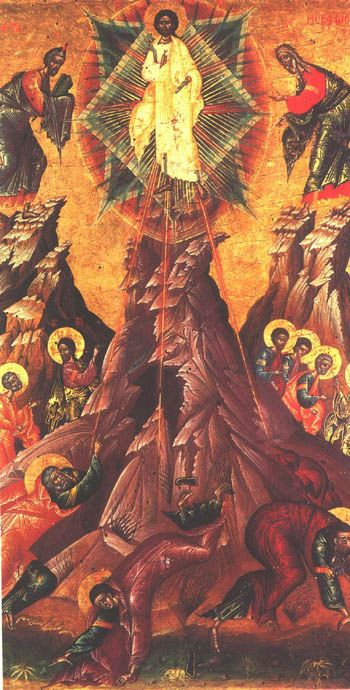
There's a standard representation of Jesus at the top in the centre, either standing or floating, flanked by the two Old Testament figures. Below, the three apostles give various reactions – usually of stunned amazement, half looking away from the radiant light.
