= Gajtan =

Gajtan may refer to:

- Gajtan, Albania, a village in Shkodër County, Albania
- Gajtan cavern, natural monument of Albania
- Donji Gajtan, in Serbia
- Gornji Gajtan, in Serbia
