= Onufri Iconographic Museum =

Coordinates: 40.7092°N 19.9453°E

- Muzeu Ikonografik "Onufri"
- Logo of National Iconographic Museum "Onufri"

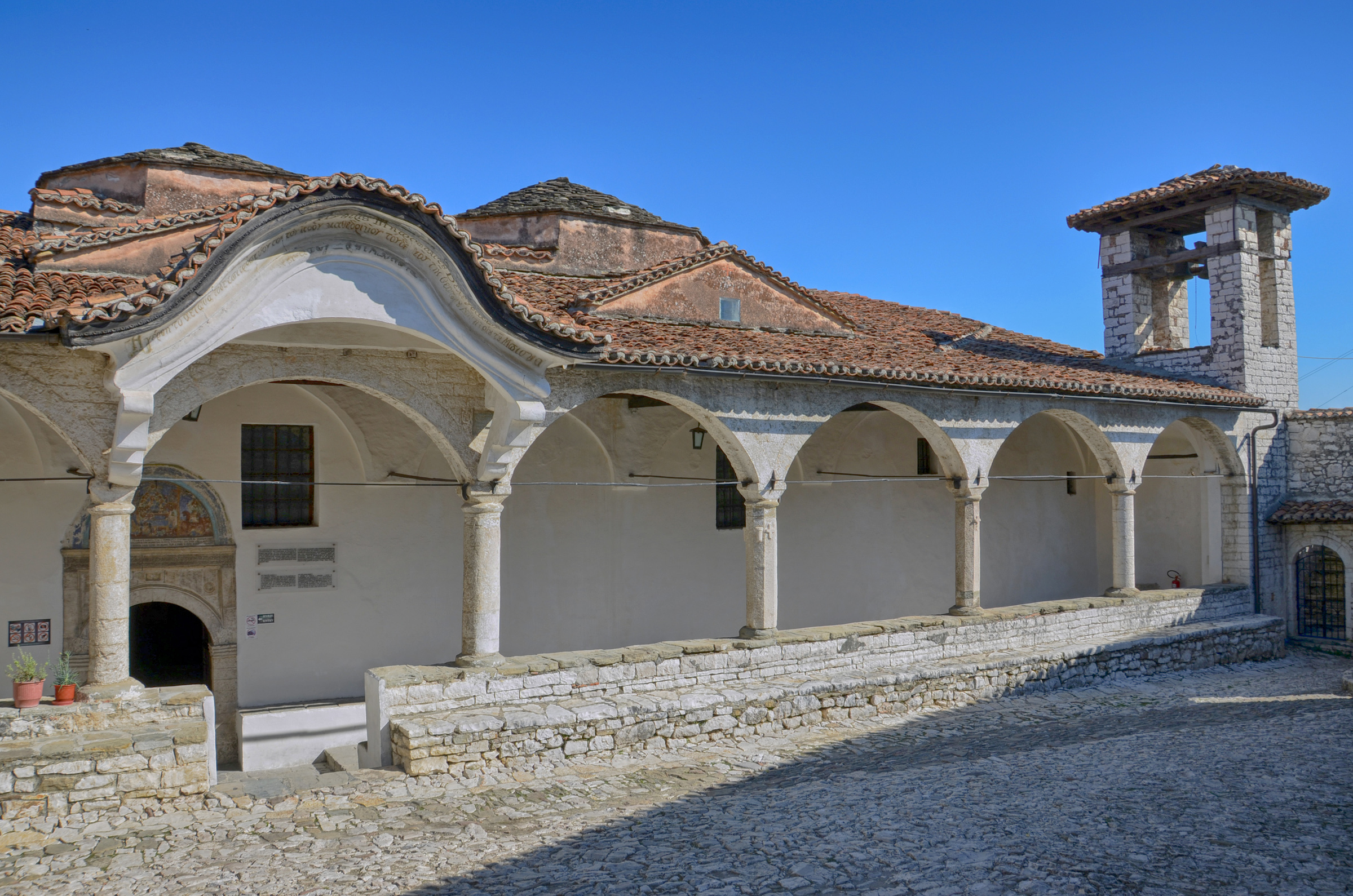
- View of National Iconographic Museum "Onufri"
- Established: 27 February 1986
- Location: Berat, Albania
- Type: Art museum
- Key holdings: Medieval Period
- Collections: Byzantine art
- Collection size: 173 objects
- Website: muzeumet-berat.al/en/onufri-iconographic-museum/

The Onufri Iconographic Museum (Albanian: Muzeu Ikonografik "Onufri") is an Albanian national museum dedicated to Byzantine art and iconography in Berat, Albania. The museum is located inside the Church of the Dormition of St Mary in the castle quarter Berat. The museum was named to honor Onufri, a painting Headmaster of the 16th century.

The museum features on display 173 objects chosen among 1500 objects belonging to the found of Albanian Churches and Monasteries as well as to Berat.

== Collection ==
The collection of the museum consists of 173 objects, 106 of which are icons and 67 are liturgical objects, and belong to the iconographic Albanian painters who created in the 14th - 20th centuries:

- Onufri
- Nikola (Onufri’s son)
- Onouphrios Cypriotes
- David Selenica
- Kostandin Shpataraku
- Çetiri’s (or Katro) tribe (Gjergj, Nikolla, Johani, Naumi, Gjergji junior)
- Many other anonymous painters.

== Gallery ==
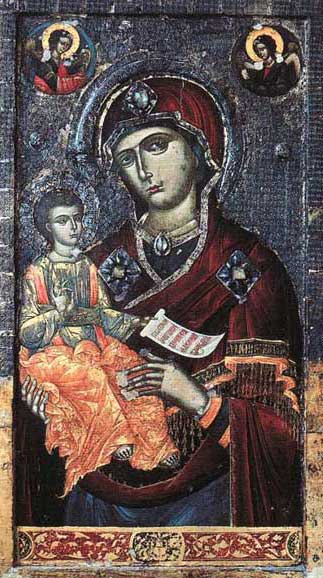
Mary and Child. Icon by Onufri (Onuphrios). 16th century.

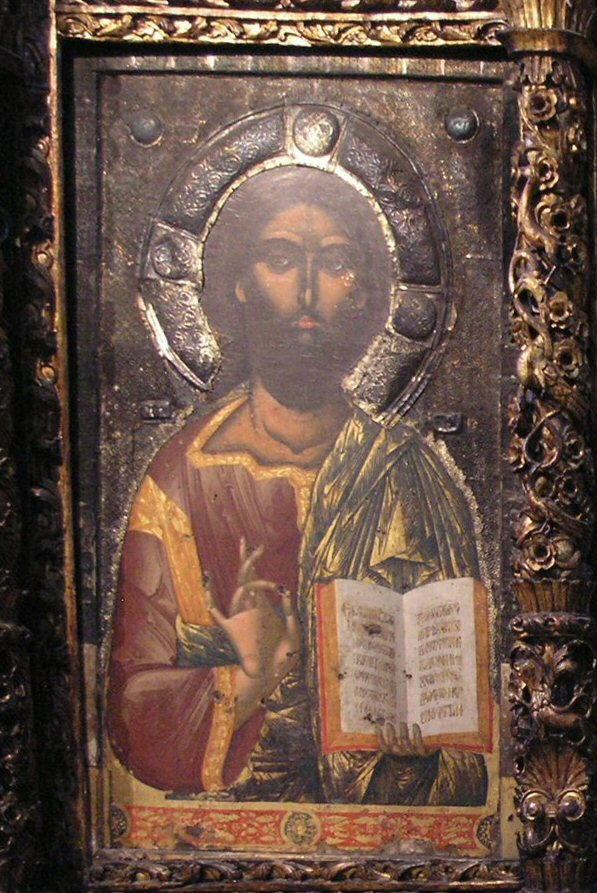
Icon by Onufri. Cathedral of Berat.

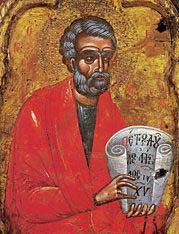
Icon of the Apostle Saint Peter, painted by Nikolla, son of Onufri, second half of the 16th century. Today Onufri-Museum Berat.

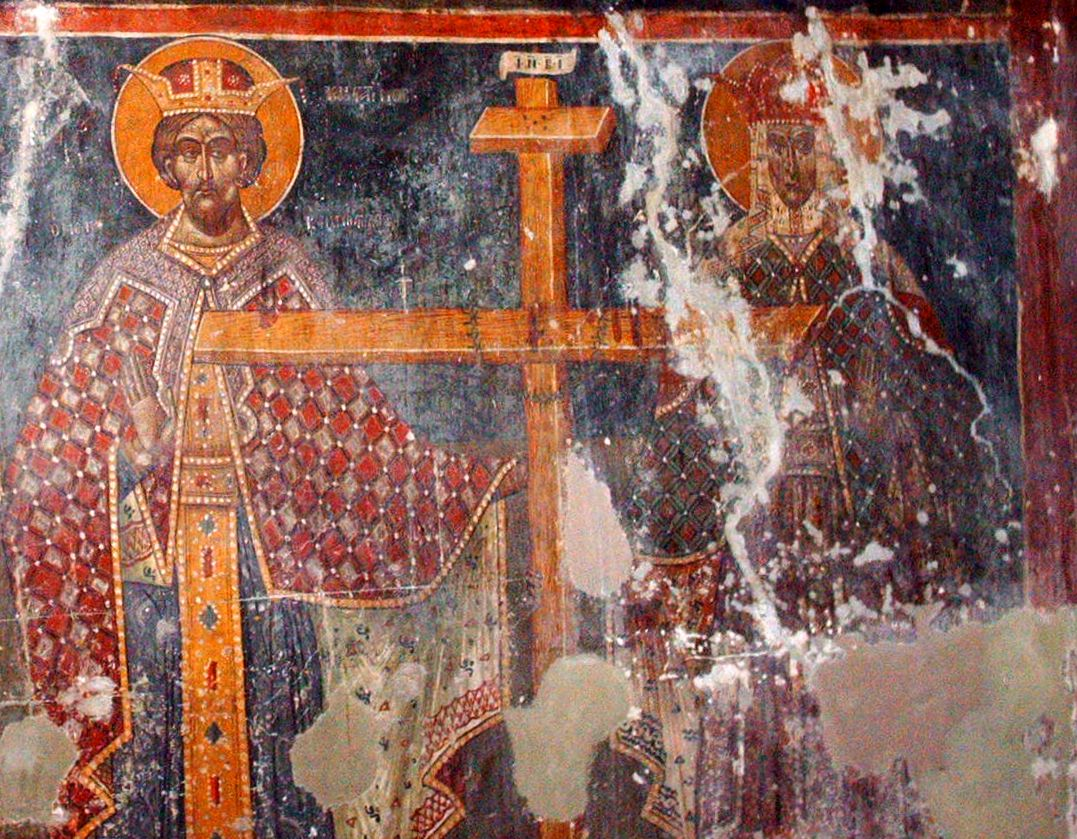
The Roman Emperor Constantine I with his mother Helena of Constantinople, who has found the relic of the holy cross in Jerusalem. Icon painted by Nikolla, son of Onufri, in the St. Mary of Blachernae Church, Berat (Albania), second half of the 16th century.

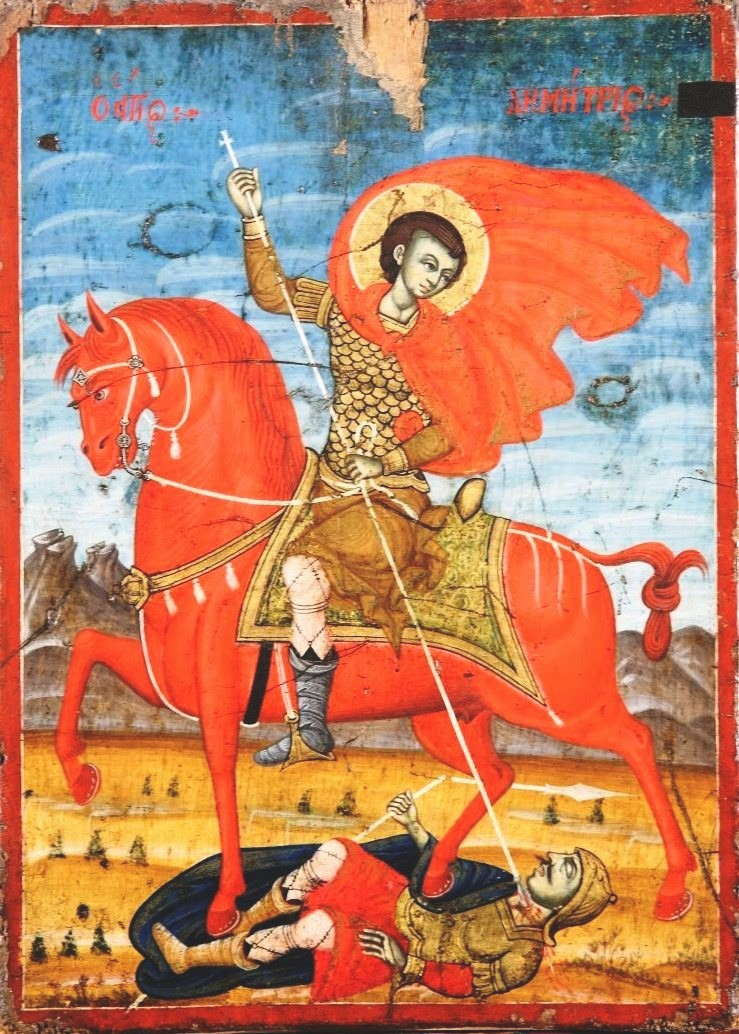
18th century icon painting by Kostandin Shpataraku.
