= Church of Saint Demetrius, Bitola =

Church in Bitola, North Macedonia

Coordinates: 41°01′47″N 21°20′02″E

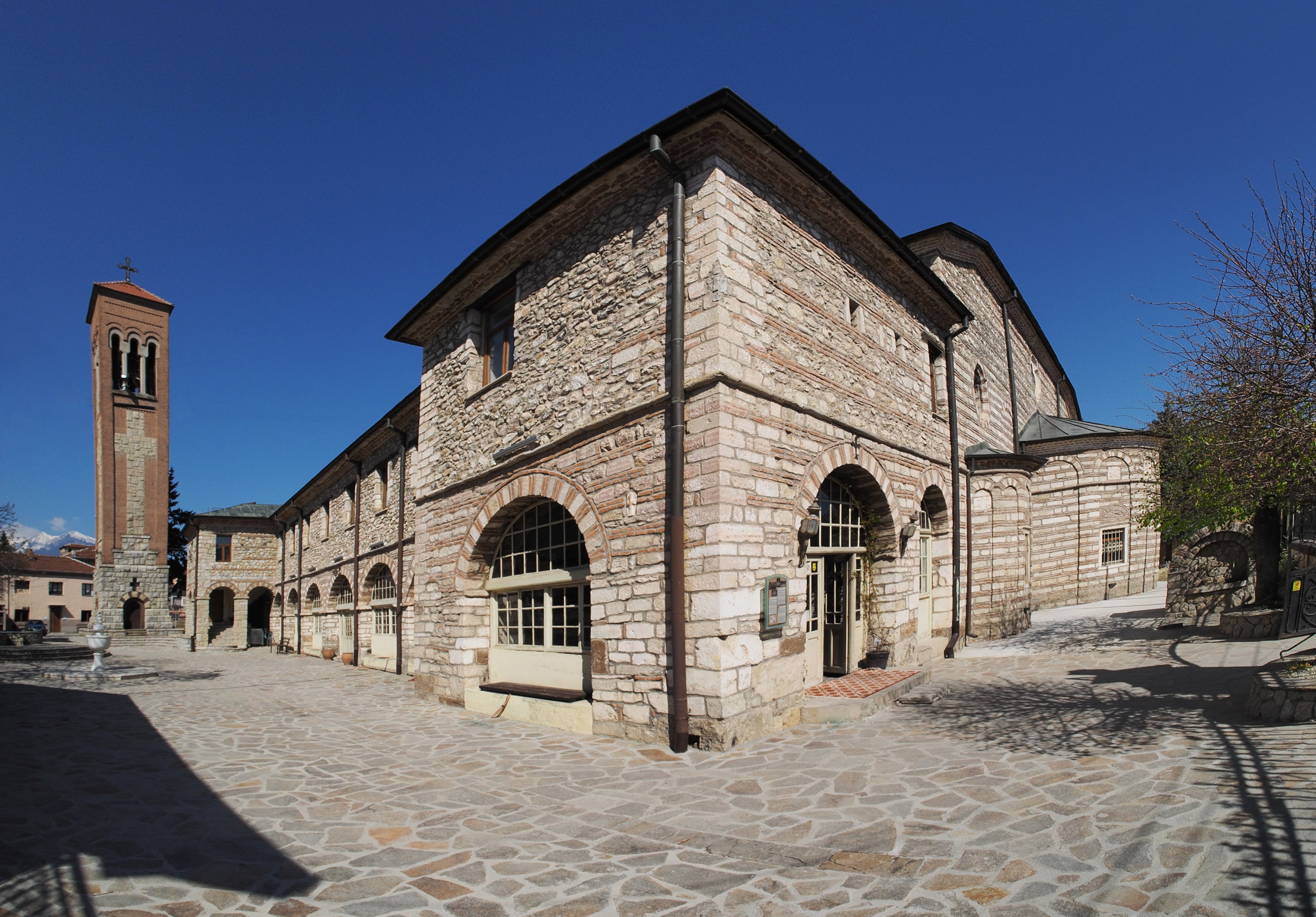
The church and its bell tower

The Church of Saint Demetrius (Macedonian: Црква „Св. Димитриј“, romanized: Crkva „Sv. Dimitrij“) is the main Macedonian Orthodox church of Bitola, North Macedonia, part of the Prespa-Pelagonia Diocese. It was built in 1830 and its most remarkable feature is considered to be its wood-carved iconostasis. The church bell tower was built in 1936. Saint Demetrius is listed as an Object of Cultural Heritage by the Ministry of Culture.

The iconostasis includes icons from 1842, done by Mihail Aganost and his son Nikolai Mihailov. Icons depicting Jesus Christ, the Introduction of the Virgin, the Baptism of Christ, the Entering into Jerusalem, the Crucifixion, Pentecost, and the Denial of Thomas, dated around 1730 and painted by David Selenica are today housed in the Museum of Macedonia in Skopje.
