= Helidon =

Helidon (from Ancient Greek χελιδών khelīdṓn 'swallow') may refer to:

- Helidon, Queensland, town in Lockyer Valley, Queensland, Australia
  - Helidon railway station, serving the town of Helidon on the Main line in Queensland, Australia
- Helidon (record label), a music label in Ljubljana, Slovenia
- Helidon Gjergji (born 1970), Albanian artist
- Helidon Xhixha (born 1970), Albanian artist
