= Nektarios Terpos =

Aromanian scholar and monk

Nektarios Terpos (Aromanian: Nectar Tãrpo; Greek: Νεκτάριος Τέρπος; late 17th century–18th century) was an Orthodox Christian scholar and monk from Moscopole (today in Albania) of Aromanian ethnicity. He was the author of an important religious book, called A Handbook called Faith (Greek: Βιβλιάριο καλούμενον Πίστις), which was first published in 1732. Terpos, together with Cosmas of Aetolia, was one of the major contributors of religious and cultural revival under the Ottoman rule.

== Life ==
Terpos came from a wealthy family and spend his childhood in Moscopole. He was of Aromanian ethnic background. As a missionary he travelled in Epirus, covering vast areas from Arta to Berat. Terpos is also remembered for his work in the Ardenica Monastery where in 1731 he wrote a prayer in the form of a fresco. The prayer is in four languages (Albanian, Aromanian, Greek and Latin) and is the first writing in Albanian found in an Eastern Orthodox Church. It is also the oldest known text in the Aromanian language.

Persecuted, Terpo migrated to Italy, where in 1732 he published his main work named A Handbook called Faith (Greek: Βιβλιάριο καλούμενον Πίστις). The book was republished 12 times in less than a century (1732–1818). In the book Terpo chastises the Crypto-Christians of Albania, and invites them to never abandon the religion of their forefathers.
