= Hetem Ramadani =

Kosovo - Albanian engineer

Hetem Ramadani (born c. 1952) is a Kosovo - Albanian engineer and businessman of Albanian extraction who is the president and founder of Salbatring, an oil products-trading company based in Ljubljana, Slovenia.

== Early life ==
Ramadani was born around 1952, of Albanian extraction. He trained as a mechanical engineer.

== Career ==
Ramadani has claimed that he was dismissed from his civil service job in Kosovo due to his support for Kosovar independence. He then fled to Slovenia in 1991, chased out of Kosovo by Slobodan Milošević's secret police according to the Financial Times, and arrived there penniless and unable to speak the language. In Slovenia, he and his wife Hazbije Ramadani founded the oil products-trading company Salbatring International which specialises in trading oil-related financial derivatives. He is president and Hazbije was the vice president. The firm was named after the couple's first three daughters.

In 2008, Salbatring began direct sales of oil and oil derivatives to its key customer, INA of Croatia. The same year, turnover at Salbatring increased from 60 million euros in 2007 to 611 million euros, despite Salbatring having only 14 employees. Ramadani was calculated to be the seventh-richest person in Slovenia, with estimated assets of over 68 million euros. Results at INA, however, were less successful, with the firm experiencing a "catastrophic" loss of about 1.5 billion kuna in the last three months of 2008. Ramadani moved to Dubai at about this time.

== Personal life ==
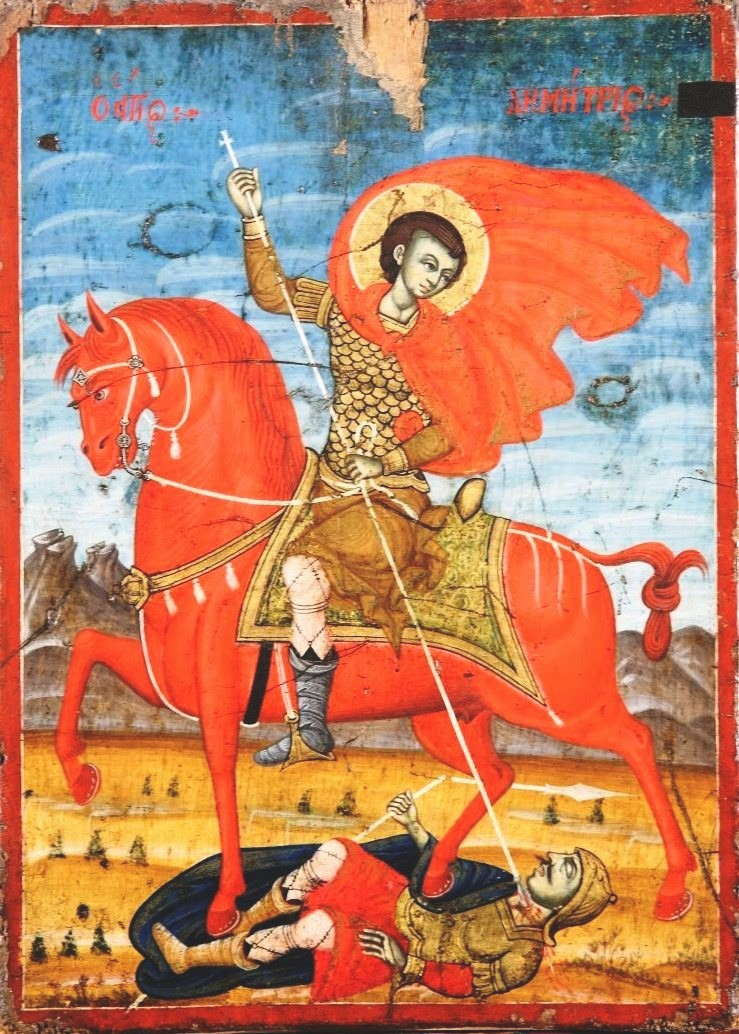
The icon thought to be by Kostandin Shpataraku, bought by Ramadani in 2010.

Ramadani married Hazbije Ramadani in 1981. They had four children but separated in 2008 and Mrs Ramadani moved to London. Mr Ramadani moved to Dubai at about the same time. Their marriage was dissolved by a Slovenian court in 2011. In legal proceedings in London in November 2015, Hazbije Ramadani argued that her former husband could afford to pay her spousal support as, in her opinion, he has assets of at least £48 million. The claim was rejected by counsel for Mr Ramadani who argued that the matter had already been settled in Slovenia. Ramadani is now married to the Albanian opera singer Inva Mula.

== Art ==
In 2010 it was reported that Ramadani was the buyer at auction for 75,000 euros of an icon by mid-eighteenth-century painter Kostandin Shpataraku that was formerly in the ownership of the family of the modern painter, Alush Shima.
