= Ardenica Monastery =

Monastery in Lushnjë municipality, Albania

Monastery of the Nativity of the Theotokos in Ardenica
- Manastiri i Ardenicës
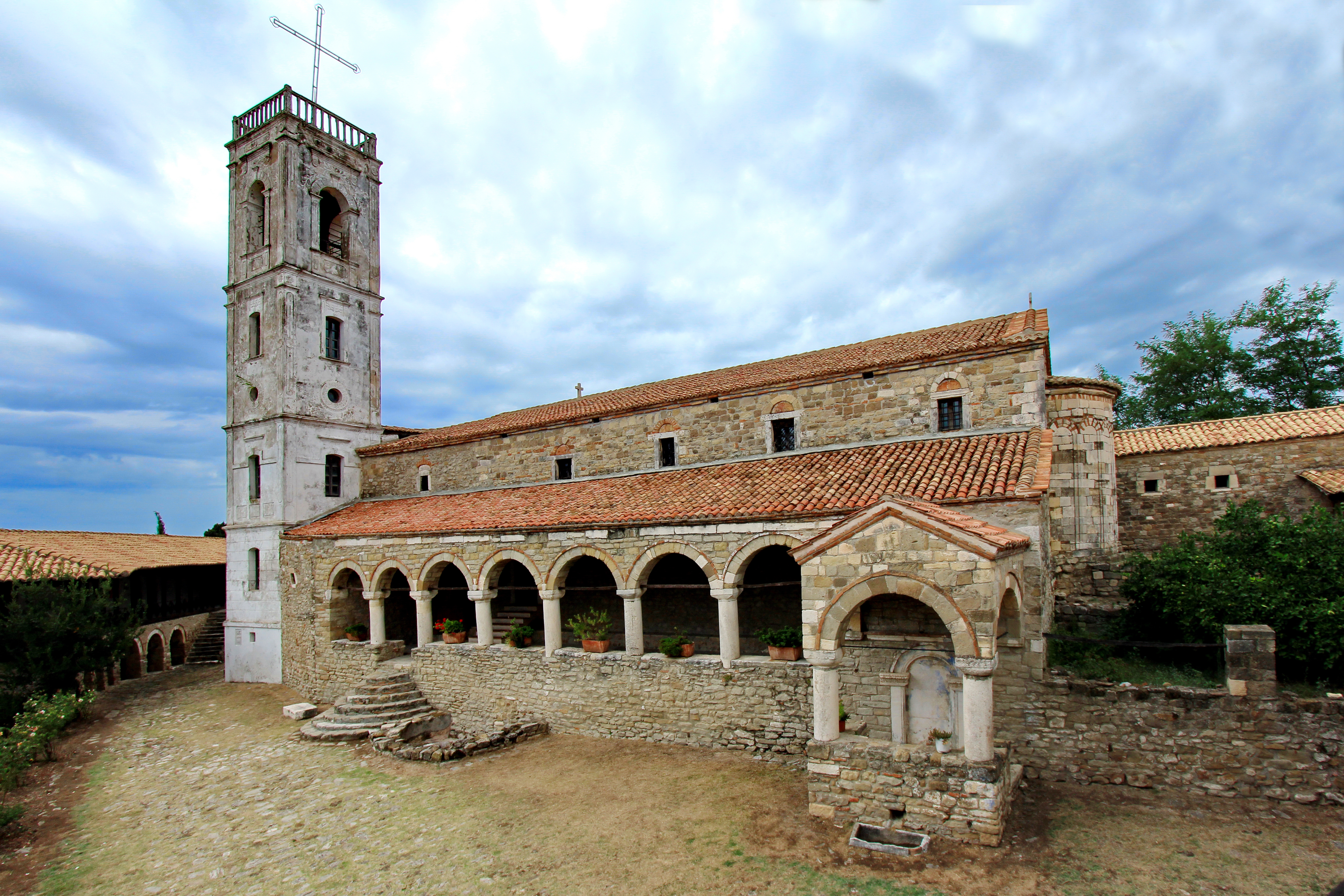
- Interactive map of Monastery of the Nativity of the Theotokos in Ardenica

Monastery information
- Order: Orthodox Autocephalous Church of Albania
- Established: 1282
- Dedication: Byzantine victory over the Angevins during the siege of Berat (1280–1281)

People
- Founder: Andronikos II Palaiologos

Site
- Location: Fier District, Albania
- Coordinates: 40°49′7″N 19°35′33″E
- Public access: yes

The Monastery of the Nativity of the Theotokos in Ardenica (Albanian: Manastiri Lindja e Hyjlindëses Mari) or simply Ardenica Monastery (Albanian: Manastiri i Ardenicës) is an Albanian Orthodox monastery, located 18 kilometers south of Lushnjë, Albania, along the national road that links Lushnjë to Fier.

Built by Byzantine Emperor Andronikos II Palaiologos in 1282, after the victory against the Angevins in the siege of Berat, the monastery is famous as the place where, in 1451, the Albanian national hero Skanderbeg married Andronika Arianiti. In 1780 the Monastery started a theological school to prepare clerics in Greek Orthodoxy. It had an important library with 32,000 volumes, which was destroyed by a fire in 1932. The Church of Saint Mary within the monastery contains frescos by the Albanian Zografi Brothers, notably one of saint John Kukuzelis, born in Durrës, Albania.

== History ==
Scholars claim that the Byzantine Emperor, Andronikos II Palaiologos started building the monastery in 1282 after the victory against the Angevins in the siege of Berat. The chapel of Saint Trinity was already there, erected centuries before. A pagan temple, dedicated to Artemis had existed on the site before the chapel, and it is thought that the name of Ardenica stems from Artemis. The monastery site lies approximately 1 km from the Via Egnatia (a major 2nd century Roman road). On April 21, 1451 in this monastery was celebrated the marriage of George Kastrioti with Andronika Arianiti. The archbishop of Kanina, Felix said the mess in the wedding in the presence of all the Albanian princes, members of the League of Lezhë and the ambassadors of the Kingdom of Naples, Republic of Venice, and Republic of Ragusa. This is mentioned first by A. Lorenzoni in 1940.

One of the most important clerics of the monastery, Nektarios Terpos from Moscopole, wrote in 1731 a short prayer in the form of a fresco. The prayer is in four languages: Latin, Greek, Aromanian and Albanian. This fact is important because it is the first text in Albanian written in a Byzantine-era church. The Albanian text reads Vigjin dhe mame e Perendis uro pren fajt orete. This multilingual short prayer also constitutes the oldest known text in the Aromanian language. It is written using the Greek alphabet, like all other languages in the inscription except Latin. The inscription is Βήργιρι Μᴕμάλ τᴕμνεζί ώρε τρέ νοι πεκιτό..λοι, in modern Aromanian spelling Viryiră, muma-al Dumnedză, oră tră noi pecătoshlji, meaning "Virgin Mother of God, pray for us sinners". It has been classified as belonging to a northern Aromanian dialect. At the end the prayers are signed Hieromonk - Nektarios Terpos the monk.

In 1743, with the initiative of the Berat's archbishop, Methodius, who was originary from Bubullimë, the monastery was renovated: the paintings from this period of the Zografi brothers pertain to this time.

Since 1780, in the Monastery existed a Greek school to prepare clerics. In 1817, the school became a high school, which had also a student house. From this school graduated the Bishop of Berat, Josif. During the Albanian National Awakening period the school became one of the places where the Albanian Language was taught.

An important cleric of the monastery was Father Mark, who was the priest to find the bones of Saint Cosmas of Aetolia, thrown in the Seman by the Turkish chevaliers.

The monastery had an exceptional library of 32,000 volumes that got completely burned by a fire in 1932.

By the late 1960s in this monastery spent the last days of his life the former primate of the Albanian Orthodox Church, Archbishop Irene Banushi. In 1967, when the atheist campaign in the People's Republic of Albania was in full swing, the monastery was saved from demolition due to the intervention of a local priest who stated that Skanderbeg was said to have been married there.

The monastery was closed for the public and for clerical duties in 1969 as the communist regime declared Albania an atheist state. The buildings and its surroundings were left in a state of decay for many years until 1988 when a partial reconstruction took place for tourism purposes. The Orthodox Autocephalous Church of Albania retook possession of the monastery in 1992 after the fall of the communist regime in Albania.

== Architecture, iconography, and watermarks ==
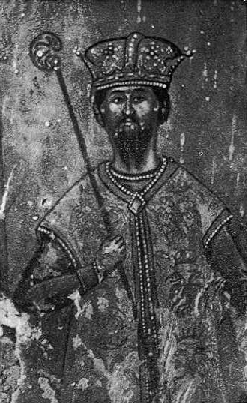
Painting of Karl Thopia found in the Ardenica Monastery

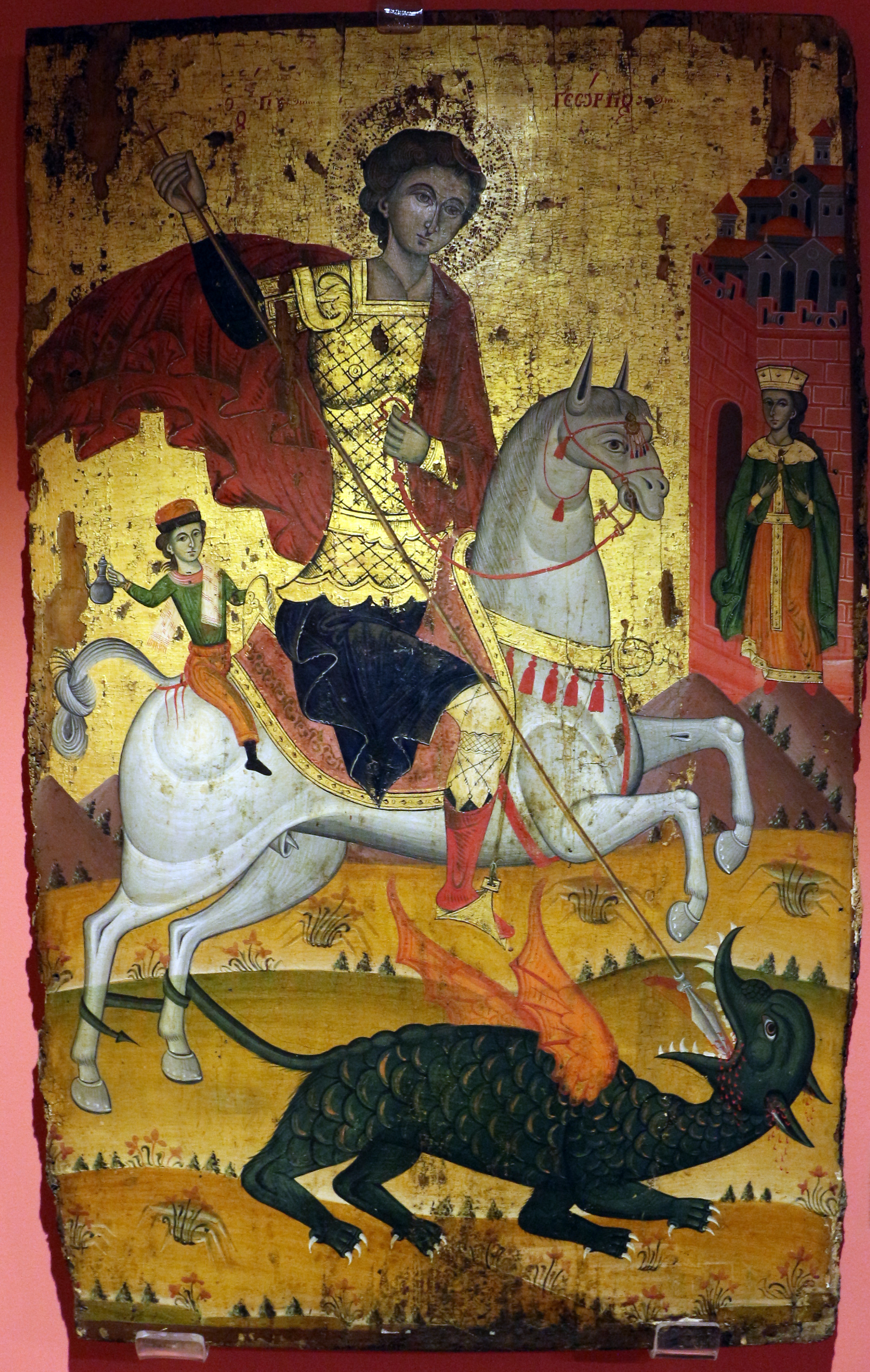
18th century icon of Saint George and the Dragon by Çetiri brothers, from Ardenica Monastery, now in the Albanian National Museum in Tirana

The monastery has a Byzantine-orthodox architecture but with many romanesque features, which lies in a surface of 2.500 meters square. It is composed of the Saint Mary Church, the chapel of the Saint Trinity, a mill, and a barn. The Church of Saint Mary in the Monastery of Ardenica has important frescos from Kostandin Zografi and Athanas Zografi. These painters from Korçë worked on the church in 1744. The frescos include an Old Testament and a New Testament, Dogmatica, Lithurgy, Life of Saints, etc.

Between the frescos is included a fresco of John Kukuzelis, the saint born in Durrës. In the narthex is present the Last judgement fresco.

The iconostasis is wooden and polychromed in gold. It was realized in 1744, with the help of the Moscopole masters. The icons are the work of the 18th century painter Kostandin Shpataraku. Some of the icons are Birth of Saint Mary, Christ on the Throne, Saint Mary and Christ, John the Baptist, Meeting of the Archangels, Crucifixion, ecc.. It is to be mentioned that in the icon of St. Jovan Vladimir of Prespa, can be found the painting of, Karl Thopia, the Albanian prince with a skepter and crown. The painter calls him King of Albania.

All the watermarks are in Greek, with the exception of the prayer written in 1731 from Nektarios Terpos in Albanian. The oldest watermark dates from 1477 and can be found in the principal entry of the monastery. A second watermark dates 1743 - 44 and pertains to the painting period from the Zografi brothers. In the monastery can also be found two plates pertaining to the 17th century. One of them, dated 1754, can be found in the western side of the church, the other, dated 1770 is found in the arches of the stove. Dates can be found also on the church's bells.

== Tourism ==
The hills of Ardenica can be found in southern Myzeqe in a dominant position. From this position, one can see Krujë, Dajti, Tomorr, the Adriatic Sea, the Karavasta lagoon and the Labëria mountains.
