= Kostandin Shpataraku =

Albanian painter (1736–1767)

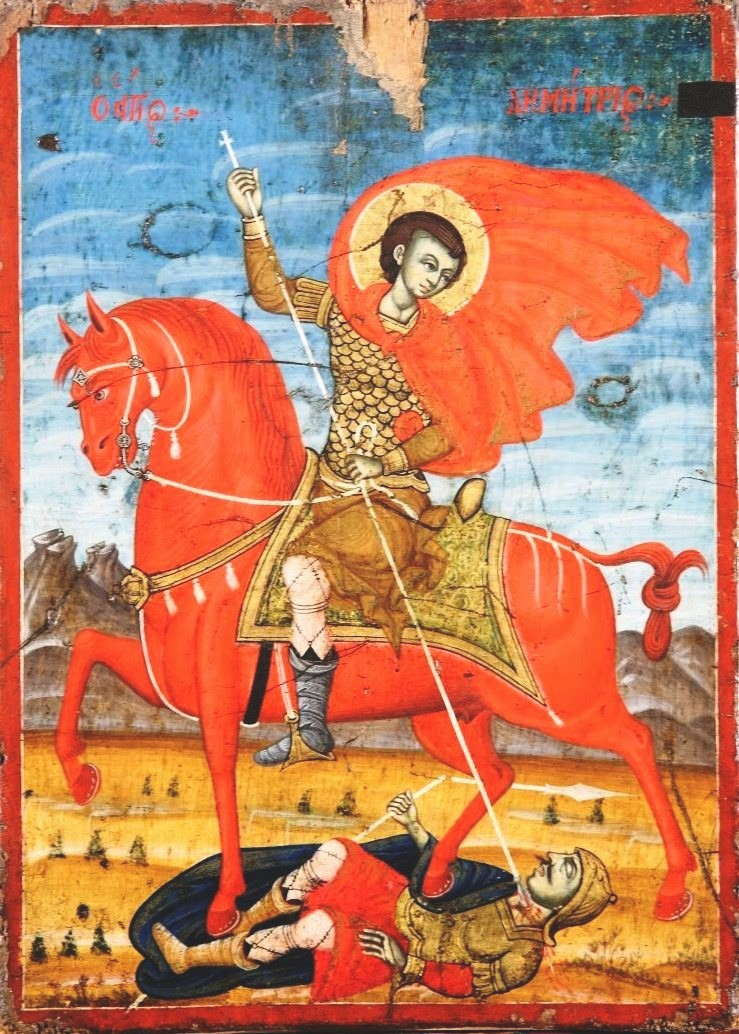
An icon attributed to Kostandin Shpataraku.

Kostandin Shpataraku (Albanian pronunciation: [ˌkɔˈstandin ˈʃpaˈtaɾˌaku]; 1736 – 1767), also commonly known as Shpataraku, was an Albanian Orthodox icon and fresco painter of the Post-Byzantine period in the eighteenth century. He continued to combine Byzantine tradition with influences from the Renaissance. He is regarded as one of the most prominent figures of medieval Albanian art besides Onufri and David Selenica.

== Life ==
Kostandin Shpataraku was born in the Shpat region within the surrounding region of Elbasan, which was at that time part of the Ottoman Empire (modern Albania). Kostandin and his family were ethnic Albanians of the Orthodox Christian faith. He was beheaded by the Ottomans in Elbasan whereby his family took his body and buried him in his village, head apart from the rest of the body, so the Ottomans could not find his exact grave. A small chapel was built subsequently to commemorate him. He is also commemorated as a saint by the locals on September 21.

He died on 13 of May 1769 in Elbasan, as a record from a local church indicates: “We are writing here the name of the Deacon, the painter of the [church of] Holy Saint, with the name Constantinos Ierodaconos, and dedicate 2,000 aspra.”

His art and legacy was distinguished by his miniatures by introducing elements from everyday life in visual art. His artistic work is represented by a collection of icons and frescoes for example inside the Ardenica Monastery and St. Jovan Vladimir's Church. Many of his works belong to private collections. Several works have been collected and restored and are nowadays on display at the National Museum of Medieval Art in Korçë, National Iconographic Museum in Berat and other museums.

In 2010, an icon painting attributed to him was sold to Hetem Ramadani for 75,000 euros at a charity ball hosted by Liri Berisha, wife of the Albanian premier. The icon had formerly been in the ownership of the family of the modern painter Alush Shima.

== See also ==
- Albanian art
- List of Albanian painters
