= Zografi Brothers =

Albanian painters

Kostandin Zografi Athanas Zografi
- Known for: Paintings

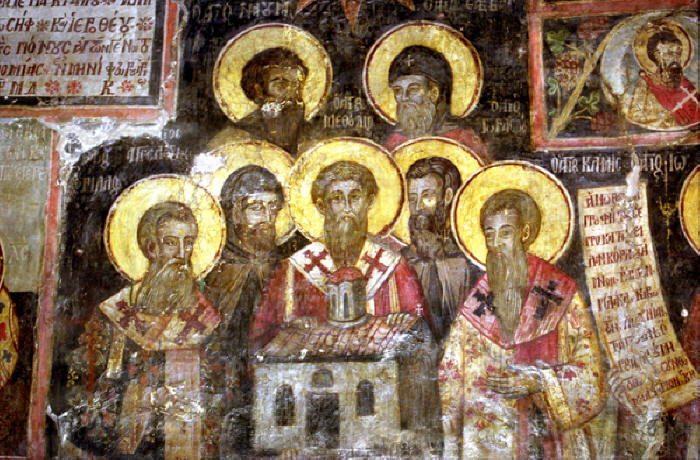
Mural fresco from Zografi Brothers around 1780 AD at the Church of Saint Mary (Kisha e Shën Mërisë) in Ardenica Monastery.

The brothers Kostandin Zografi and Athanas Zografi (or as they were known locally, Kostë and Thanas Korçari) were Albanian painters of the 18th century from Dardhë, in modern Korçë municipality, southern Albania (then Ottoman Empire). They are regarded as the most prominent painters of the Albanian post-Byzantine icon art of the 18th century and generally of the region of Epirus. Along with David Selenica, Kostandin Shpataraku, Terpo Zografi, Efthim Zografi, Joan Çetiri, Naum Çetiri, Gjergj Çetiri, Nikolla Çetiri, and Ndin Çetiri they represent the School of Korçë painting.

== Works ==
The Zografi brothers have decorated with their paintings several Orthodox churches and monasteries throughout central and southern modern Albania, as well as Mount Athos. In particular, their paintings and frescoes in Moscopole, especially in the church St. Athanasius (Albanian: Kisha e Shën Thanasit) and the monastery of Saints Cosmas and Damian in Vithkuq are of unique value. They were active in the period 1736-1783 and usually signed their works in Greek "By the hand of Konstantinos and Athanasios from Korytza [sic] (Korçë)" (Greek: Διὰ χειρὸς Κωνσταντίνου καὶ Αθανασίου απὸ Κορυτζᾶ). Konstantinos signed many of his works (usually portable icons) as "Κωνσταντίνος Aρβανίτης" (aka, Konstantinos the Albanian). Their surname, Zografi, means "painters" in Greek: Ζωγράφοι.

== Technique ==
The work of the Zografi brothers has a marked tendency towards the baroque, with linear depictions of the religious figures, and at the same time adopting an ornamental style using a wide variety of brown and bright colors. The main colors used in their works were white, bright blue, and dark red.

Zografi brothers together with David Selenicasi continued the tradition of the Palaeologan art that was revived at Mount Athos during 18th century.

== Sources ==
- Kirchhainer, Karin (2003). "Das Ossuarium des Petrus- und Paulus- Kloster in Vithkuq (Nordepirus) und seine Freskendekoration (1750)" (PDF). Makedonika (in German). 34 (4): 149–208. doi:10.12681/makedonika.872.
