= List of public art in Albania =

List of public sculptures and monuments in Albania.

== Durres ==
General Thomson - Bust

Hafiz Podgoric - Bust

Hero's Monument

John Lennon

== Elbasan ==
To the Educators of Elbasan

Dedication to Albanian language

== Fushe Kruja ==
George W. Bush

== Koman ==
Virgin Mary

== Korca ==
Unknown Soldier

== Kruja ==
Skanderbeg - Figure on Horse

== Tepelene ==
Ali Pasha Tepelene

== Tirana ==
Abdi Toptani - Figure, Partizan Square

Adem Jashari - Bust, Skanderbeg Street (Embassy Row)

Andon Cajupi - Bust, New Exhibition

Avni Rustemi - Bust, New Market

Azem Hajdari - Democratic Party Headquarters

Fan Noli, - Figure, Parliament

Frasheri Brothers - Bust, Lovers Park (Twin Towers)

Frasheri Brothers - Bust, Tirana Lake Park

Frédéric Chopin - Bust, Chopin Square

Misto Mame - Bust, Kombinat

Mother Albania by Kristaq Rama - Figure, Martyrs Cemetery

Mother Teresa - Figure, Tirana University

Mother Teresa - Figure, Tirana International Airport

Qemal Stafa - Bust, Park next to residence of the President

Skanderbeg by Odhise Paskali - Figure on Horse, Skanderbeg Square

Unknown Partizan - Figure, Partizan Square

== Shkodra ==
Five Heros of Shkodra - Formerly in the city centre (removed in 2009)

Mother Teresa

== Vlora ==
Fisherman - Figure, Beachfront

Monument of Independence
