= Onufri =

Albanian archbishop and painter

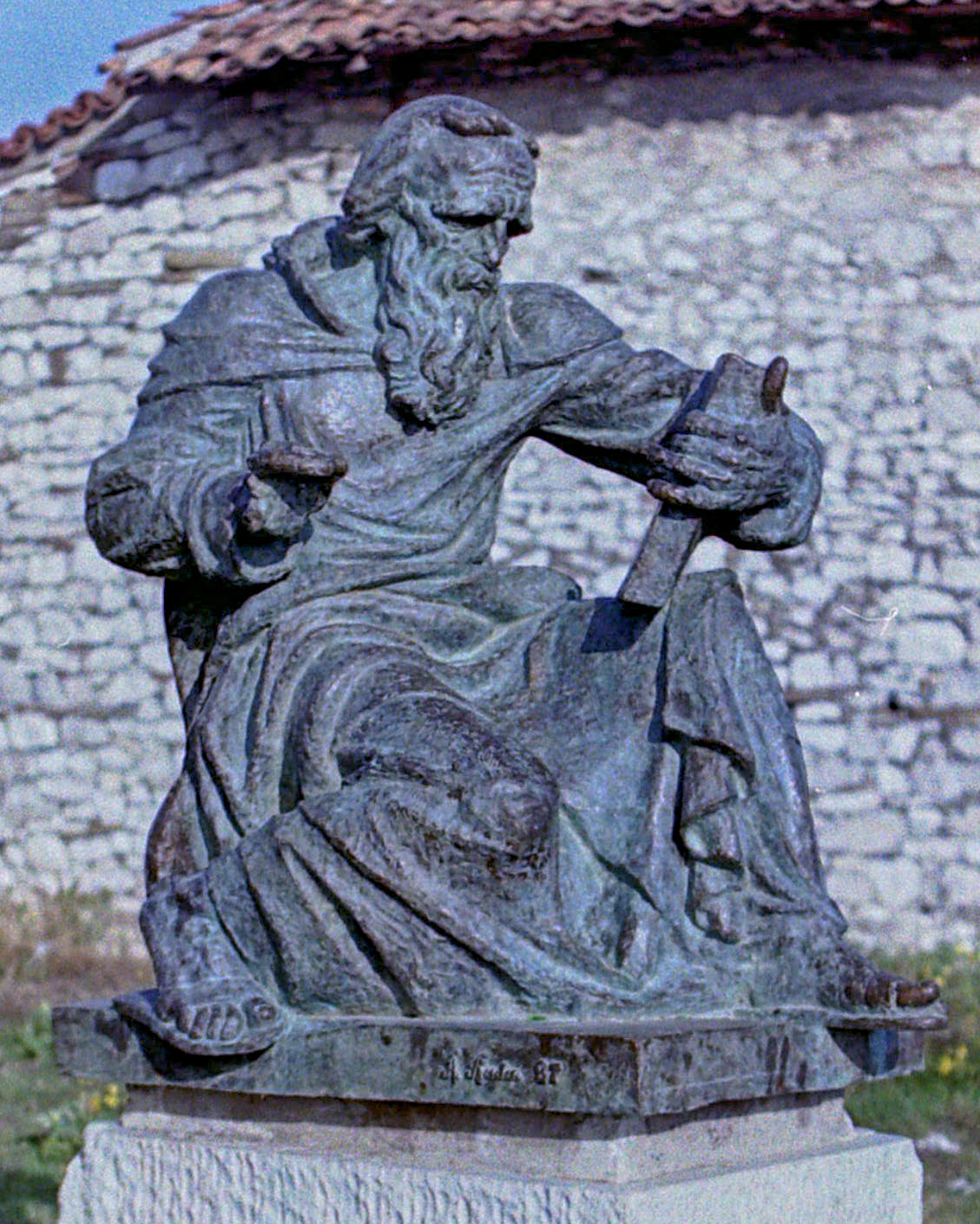
A statue of Onufri in Berat, Albania

Onufri (Albanian: Onufri; Greek: Ονούφριος; Italian: Onufri), Onouphrios of Neokastro or Onouphrios Argytes, was a 16th century Archpriest of Elbasan and the most important painter of Orthodox murals and icons in the early post-Byzantine era in Albania. He founded a school of painting in Berat and extended his influence as far afield as Kastoria. Trained in Venice, he infused Albanian icon painting with the artistic climate of the Italian Renaissance. His works reveal a great degree of originality and ecclesiastically combined post-Byzantine and Gothic elements. Onufri's works played a decisive role in the following trends of Albanian art, up to the 19th century.

The Onufri Iconographic Museum, an Albanian national museum in Berat, is named after the painter.

== Life ==
Little is known with certainty about Onufri's life and his existence only emerged in the early 20th century. Regarding his birthplace only an inscription in the Holy Apostles church near Kastoria has survived. Onufri is believed to have been born in the early 16th century either in the region of Berat (in today's Albania) or near Kastoria or Grevena (in today's northern Greece). The epithet Argitis, which appears in a fresco near Kastoria may point to Argos as his place of birth, although as he used it only once it is regarded probable that it refers to a location in the area of Kastoria. His flawless Greek calligraphic inscriptions is an indicator that he received high-level education. He was educated in the Republic of Venice and was a member of the Greek Brotherhood of Venice.

In the climate of the time, the painting of Christian icons can be seen as an act to restore pre-Ottoman culture. He was active in Berat and possibly Venice until 1547. Then he worked in both Berat and Kastoria and in 1555, in Shelcan near Elbasan. He may have also been the painter of various murals in the church of St. Nicholas near Prilep (North Macedonia). After 1554, he lived and painted in the village of Valsh. In a number of churches his works were signed with the title "Protopapas" (Greek: Πρωτόπαππας), demonstrating a senior position in the church hierarchy. However, his signature has not been preserved on icons that have been also attributed to him such as a Dodekaorton icon at that is preserved at the National Museum of Medieval Art in Korce.

== Work ==
Onufri introduced greater realism and individuality into facial expressions, breaking with the strict conventions of the time. He was the first to introduce the colour pink into icon painting. The secret of this colour was not passed on and died with him. His work is noted for the intense use of colours and the use of natural dyes. Onufri's painting well attests red as a traditional Albanian color. The works of Onufri were significantly influenced by western art, as a result of his possible stay in Venice, being a member of the local Greek fraternity. Western traces are few and they can be probably explained due to the contact with the paintings of the Cretan School.

Onufri founded a school of painting in Berat, which was passed on to his son Nikolla, and upon his death to Onouphrios Cypriotes (Onufri Cypriota) and Kostandin Shpataraku.

== Gallery ==
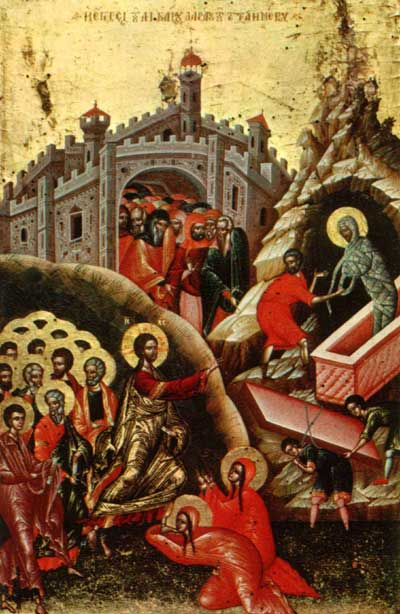
"The Resurrection of Lazarus." Byzantine icon painted by Onufri, 16th century. Museum of Mediaeval Art in Korça.

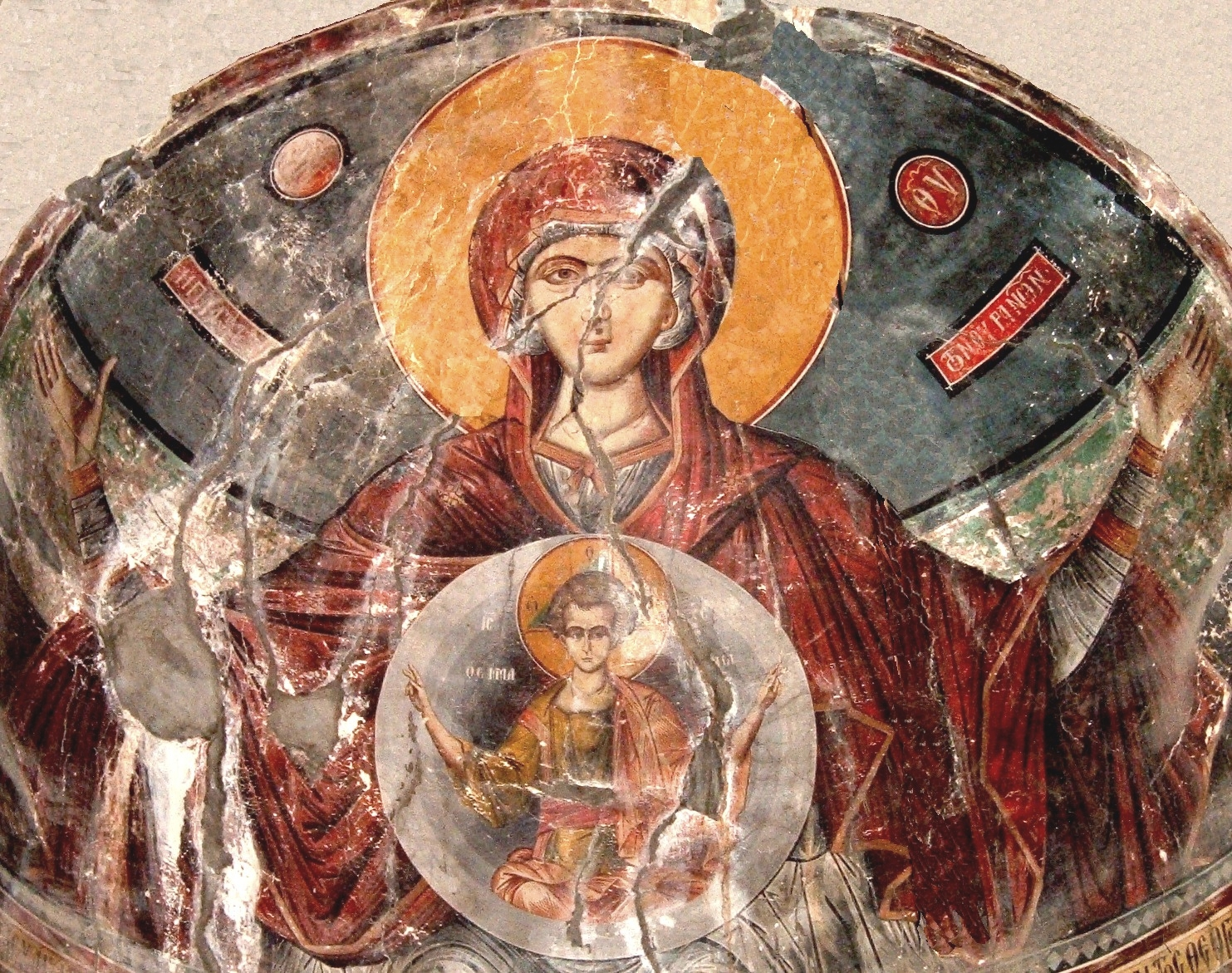
Fresco in Holy Apostles church in Kastoria (16th)

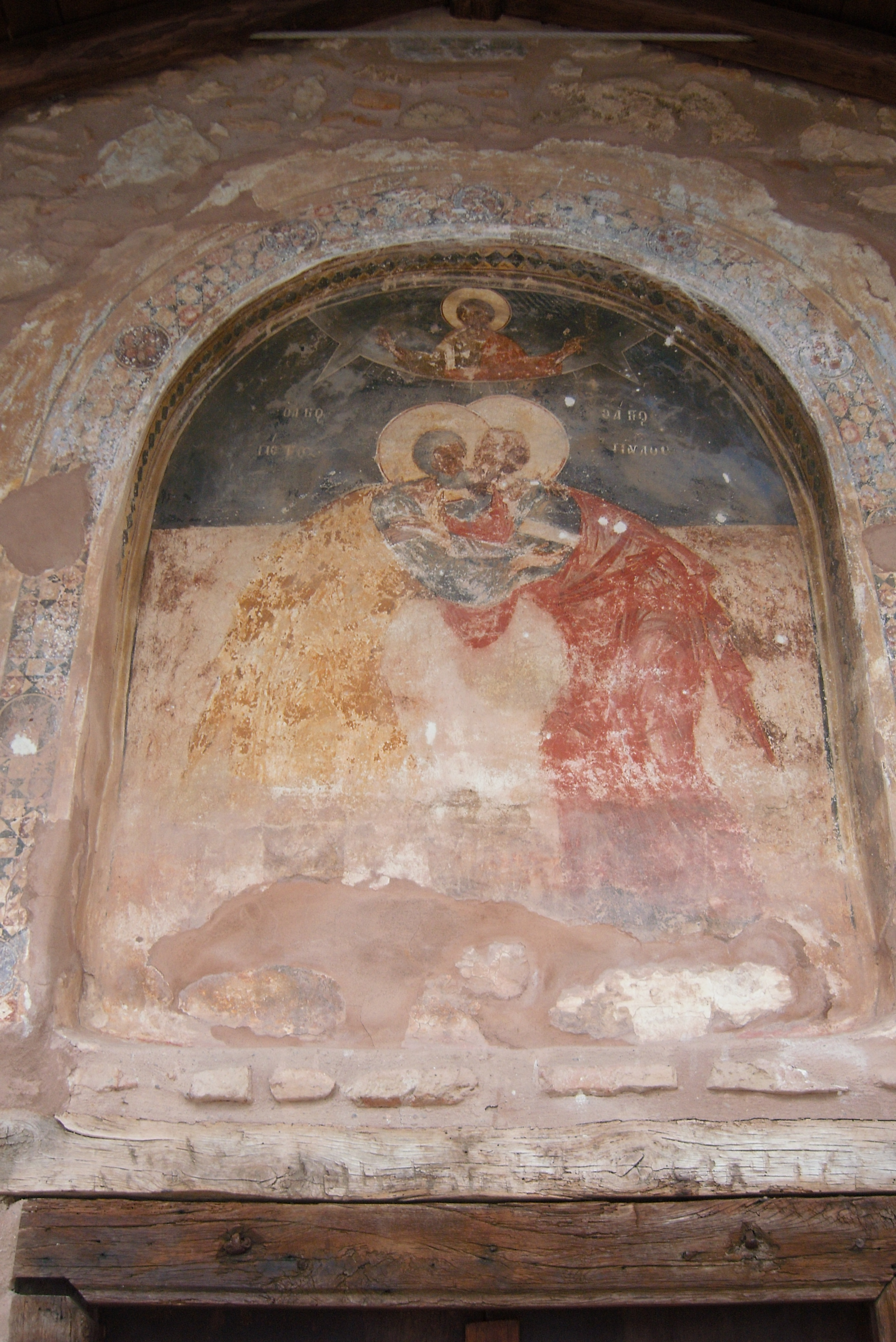
Sts Peter and Paul fresco, Holy Apostles church in Kastoria

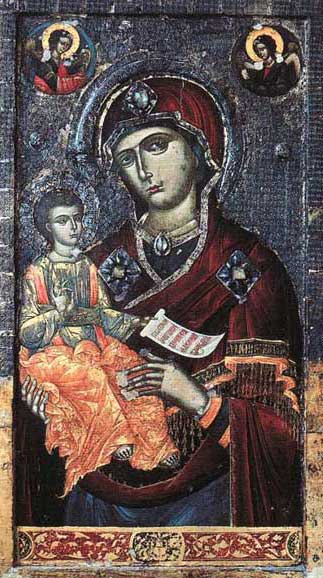
Mary and Child. Icon by Onufri, 16th century.

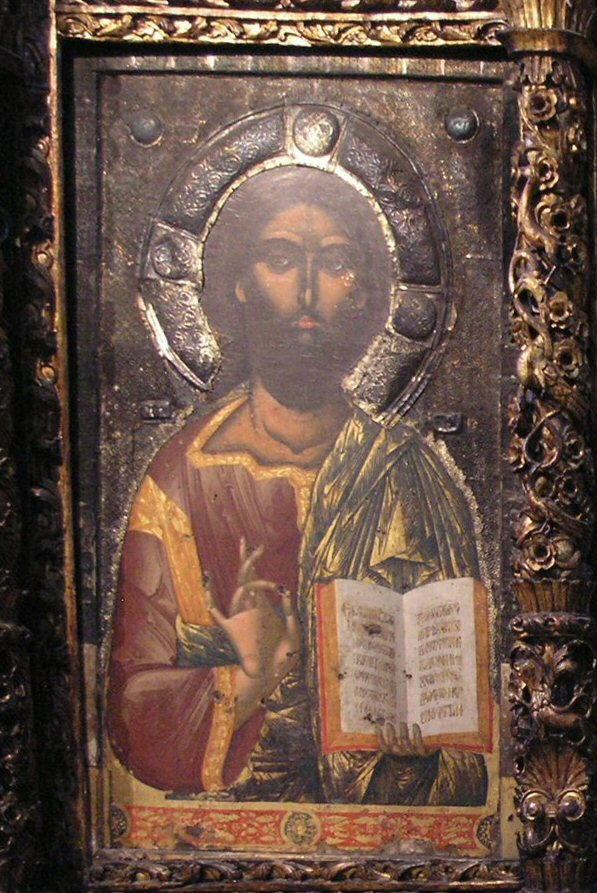
Icon by Onufri in Cathedral of Berat.

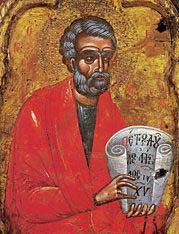
Icon of the Apostle Saint Peter, painted by Nikolla, son of Onufri, second half of 16th century. Today Onufri-Museum Berat.

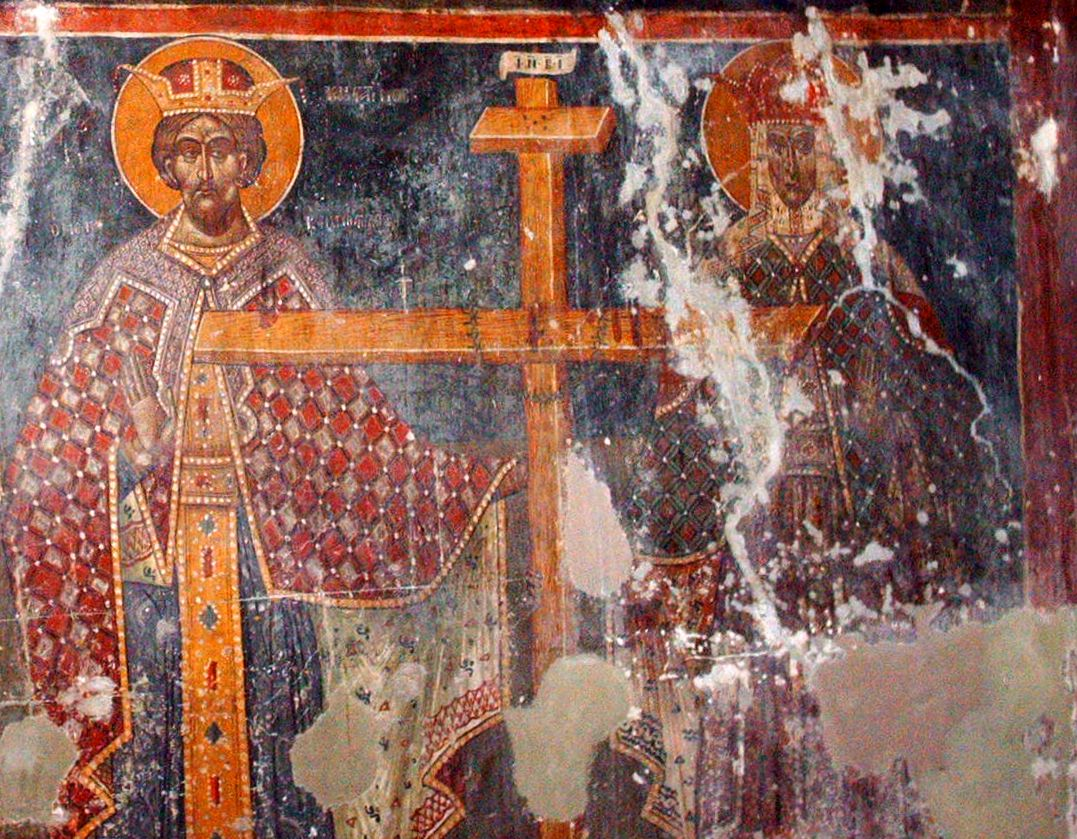
The Roman Emperor Constantine I with his mother Helena of Constantinople, who found the holy cross in Jerusalem. Icon painted by Nikolla, son of Onufri, in the St. Mary of Blachernae Church, Berat (Albania), second half of 16th century.
