= Helidon Gjergji =

Albanian contemporary artist

- Born: 1970 (age 55–56); Tirana, Albania
- Education: Academy of Arts in Tirana; Academy of Fine Arts, Naples, Italy; Northwestern University, Chicago
- Known for: Contemporary art

Helidon Gjergji (born 1970 in Tirana, Albania) is a contemporary artist who works in various media.

He has worked in a variety of mediums, including painting, media installation, and architecture.

Helidon has taught at the State University of New York, Parsons New School of Design (NYC), the School of the Art Institute of Chicago, Northwestern University (Chicago), and others.

== See also ==
- Albanian art

== Bibliography ==
- Cathryn Drake, 2018, “Cetinje, Montenegro: Helidon Gjergji, National Museum of Montenegro,” Artforum
- Ian Bancroft, 2017, "Tito's Arc: Bosnian Nuclear Bunker Transformed into a Contemporary Art Space," The Independent.
- Daria Sito-Sucic, 2015, "Bosnian Artists Plan Cold War Museum in Tito's Secret Bunker," Reuters.
- Jessica De Korte, 2015, "Underground Art in Tito’s Bunker," The Irish Times.
- Cathryn Drake, 2014, “Tirana, Albania: Helidon Gjergji, National Gallery of Arts,” Artforum
- Santa Nastro, 2014, "Stalin? Lo becco su Facebook. Helidon Gjergji a Tirana," Artribune
- Elsa Demo, 2014, Interview at the National Gallery of Albania, ABC News, Albania
- Public Talk, 2014, "Building Communities Through Public Art," Teachers College, Columbia University
- Julia Draganovic, 2011, Interview at Venice Biennale 54, Clocktower Radio
- Marco Purpura, 2011, "Transmedia Memory of Albanian Migration in Italy: Helidon Gjergji's, Adrian Paci's, and Anri Sala's Moving-Image Installations," California Italian Studies Journal, UC Berkeley
- Ana Vukadin, 2010, "New Residents of Murcia," Manifesta 8, Art in America.
- Santa Nastro, 2010, "Da Manifesta: L’opera Piu Apprezzata Da Tutti? Non Si Vede...," Exibart
- Catalogue 2010, Venice Biennale of Architecture 12.
- Francesca Picchi, 2010, "Beyond Color," Domus.
- Diana Marrone, 2010, The Tirana Façades Project, CultFrame
- Marie Liljedahl, 2010, Interview, Swedish Radio
- Katie Donoghue, 2009, "Helidon Gjergji: Waves," Whitewall Magazine.
- Amanda Browder, 2009, Interview, Bad at Sports
- Amalia Piccinini, 2009, Flash Art
- Valentina Sansone, 2008, "Silica," 'Flash Art.
- Jessica Savoia, 2008, "Helidon Gjergji," Espoarte.
- Nicola Bozzi, 2008, "Helidon Gjergji," Exibart.
- Catalogue 2007, Venice Biennale of Art 52.
- Carlo Simula, 2007, L’Uomo Vogue.
- Chiara Canali, 2006, "Helidon Gjergji," Flash Art.
- James Yood, 2006, "Helidon Gjergji," Contemporary Magazine.
- Ivan Quaroni, 2004, "Helidon Gjergji," Flash Art.
- Enrico Giacomelli, 2004, "Helidon Gjergji: Hawaii, Milano" Exibart.
- Michele Robecchi, 2004, "Helidon Gjergji", Ciocca Arte Contemporanea, Milan, exhibition catalogue
- Donatella Galasso, 2003, "Present Future," Teknemedia.
- Pedro Velez, 2002, "Kaleidoscope," Sculpture Magazine.
- Jon Anderson, 2001, "Park-in salutes cars many uses," Chicago Tribune
- Michelle Grabner, 2001, "Helidon Gjergji at Temporary Services," New Art Examiner.
- Giancarlo Politi, 2001, "La Biennale di Tirana 1," Flash Art.
- Francesco Bonami, 2001, "Tirana Biennale 1", exhibition catalogue
