= David Selenica =

Albanian painter

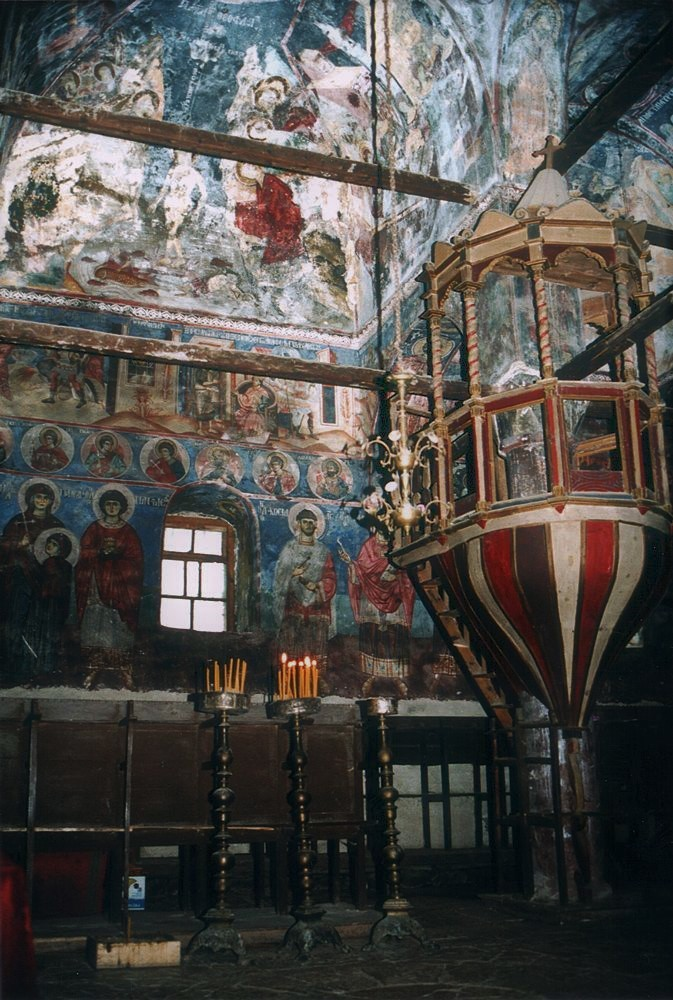
Murals of St. Nicholas church in Moscopole, painted by David Selenicasi

David Selenica (Albanian pronunciation: [daˈvid sɛlɛˈnitsa]; 17th century – 18th century), also commonly known as Selenicasi, was an Albanian Orthodox icon and fresco painter of the Post-Byzantine period in the seventeenth century. Alongside Onufri and Kostandin Shpataraku, he is regarded as one of the most prominent figures of medieval Albanian art.

Selenicasi, also known as David of Selenica, was born in the late 17th century in Selenicë, a village in the region of Kolonjë. He died in the mid-18th century near Korçë.

== Works ==
In 1715 he painted frescoes in one of the chapels of the monastery of the Great Lavra, the first monastery built on Mount Athos in Greece. From 1722 to 1726, David Selenica and his two disciples Kostandin and Kristo painted the murals, the frescoes and the basilica of the church of Saint Nicholas in Moscopole. In 1727 he painted the murals and the frescoes of the church of Saint John the Baptist in Kastoria, and the church of Blessed Virgin Mary in Thessaloniki.

== Technique ==
In contrast to other painters of his era, Selenica uses bright colours in his paintings and icons. Selenica combines elements of Byzantine art of the Paleologan era and Venetian school of art.

== Legacy ==
David Selenicasi's work influenced many of his contemporaries like Kostandin Shpataraku, the brothers Kostandin and Athanas Zografi and works of the early 19th century. He is regarded as the founder of a distinct national school of painters based in Korçë.

His works are exhibited in the National Historical Museum of Albania in Tirana in the pavilion of icon painting and the National Museum of Medieval Art of Korçë. Other works of David Selenicasi are found in several monasteries of Mount Athos. In Moscopole seven of his murals have been preserved.

== See also ==
- Albanian art
- List of Albanian painters
