= Albanian Institute New York =

Cultural organization in New York City

- Purpose: Contemporary Art, Culture, Society, Education
- Location: New York City
- Website: www.albanianinstitute.org

The Albanian Institute New York is a multi-arts and cultural institution supporting, producing, and presenting the full range of performing arts, visual arts, and contemporary culture.

A non-profit contemporary art and cultural established in the State of New York, the institute focuses on presenting emerging artists, promoting artistic excellence, providing a forum for cultural dialogue and strengthening intercultural relations, and creating educational opportunities worldwide.

== Programs ==
Programs range from music to literature, film to theatre and dance, visual arts, to architecture, design and fashion, in addition to talks and lecture series, with collaborations across these disciplines and others, in the US and around the world.

== Design and Architecture ==
Albanian Institute New York represented Albania at the inaugural London Design Biennale 2016, and was the winner and awarded with a Medal for its design contribution. London Design Biennale, that takes place at Somerset Hose, is a global gathering of the world’s most ambitious and imaginative designers, curators and design institutions. London Design Biennale awards four medals to the best contributions from the participating countries, cities and territories.

Albanian Institute was one of the Medal winners, awarded for the best contribution with the most exceptional design, along with Lebanon, Russia, and Switzerland.

== Partnerships ==
The institute has established numerous valuable partnerships and collaborations with some of the world's biggest organizations, museums, and corporations to run our programing including New Museum, Museum of the Moving Image, and online platforms such as Artsy.

The institute is based in Manhattan and is a member of the European Union National Institutes for Culture EUNIC in New York.

"The Group of European Cultural Institutes of New York presents cutting-edge and thought provoking artistic and intellectual European achievements to New York and U.S. audiences."

The institute has also established numerous valuable partnerships and collaborations with prominent organization, including online platforms such as Artsy.

The Institute focuses on "modern trends and progress in society, culture, education, economics and youth among Albanian communities at home and abroad."
