= Gajtan Cave =

Cave in Albania

The Gajtan cave (Albanian: Shpella e Gajtanit) is a natural monument in Gajtan, Albania, Albania.
