= DebatikCenter of Contemporary Art =

DebatikCenter of Contemporary Art (also styled D.C.C.A.) is a contemporary art center and independent film production center based in Tirana, Albania. D.C.C.A defines itself as "nexus of academics, filmmakers, architects, artists, imaginary and real collectives, critics, curators, journalists, activists, translators, etc., that seek to shine a light on these practices but also offer the necessary tools to imagine alternative futures and strategies of resistance to the status quo."

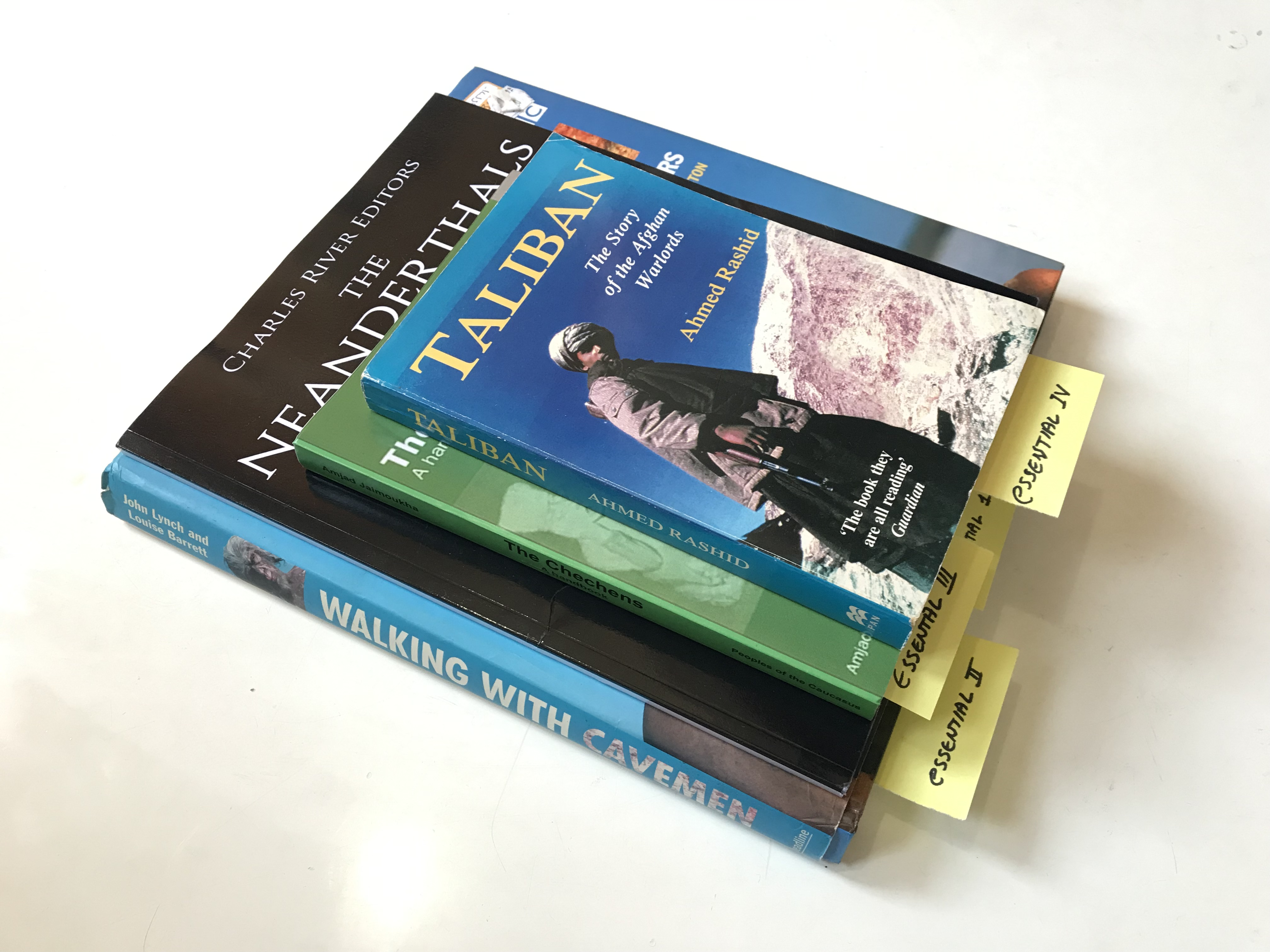
ESSENTIAL LIBRARY by DebatikCenter of Contemporary Art Documentation of four books 2018

== History and projects ==
The D.C.C.A. was founded in 2003 in Bologna by Armando Lulaj, Salvator Qitaj, and Ergin Zaloshnja, as a center for discussing and examining the country's social changes. DebatikCenter took its name from the Albanian anti-fascist youth organization Debatik. D.C.C.A made its first appearance during "U-topos,” the 2nd Tirana Biennale in 2003, with the public performance "Brotherhood Phobia.”

In 2017, D.C.C.A. reorganized under the direction of Armando Lulaj, Jonida Gashi, and Pleurad Xhafa, rethinking the objectives of the institution in relation to visual, cinematic, theoretical, and political arts. As a result, it embarked on an examination of Albania's past while maintaining a critical gaze on neo-liberal consolidation, focusing on social reality while proposing a new chapter in the country's historical narrative. They also founded the art collective La Société Spectrale.

In the same year, D.C.C.A. started organizing a series of “Strikes,” compact performances and actions in public space, for example around the then recently renovated Skanderbeg Square, featuring projects by Armando Lulaj, Pleurad Xhafa, La Société Spectrale, Underground Movement, Skarlet Hori, and others. Many of the Strikes were in direct response to political events and public works in Tirana.

In response to the illegal demolition of National Theatre of Albania, D.C.C.A. initiated in 2020 the drafting of a public letter against the artwashing tactics of the government of Prime Minister Edi Rama. The letter was publicly released in Albanian, French, Italian, and English, gathering hundreds of signatures.

=== Moving Billboard ===
Moving Billboard (2018) brought together a group of international artists showing their work on twenty-four billboards across twenty-four locations in Tirana over the course of twenty-four hours for a single hour each. The project focused on issues such as economic corruption and police brutality, environmental collapse, war, and terrorism. Participating artists included Shuji Akagi, James Benning, Charlotte Beradt, Skarlet Hori, David Kampi, Shpëtim Koloshi, Katherine Liberovskaya, Underground Movement, Phil Niblock, Jun Jin, Sokol Peçi, Victor Strato, Tim Shaw, La Société Spectrale, and Wolfgang Staehle.

A second iteration of ‘’Moving Billboard’’ was created in collaboration with art collective Manifesto as part of the project Manifesto Desertion (2023). Collaborating and featured artists included Issam Badr, Zef Bumçi, Deniz Gezmiş, Barbad Golshiri, Martin Johnson Heade, Alban Hajdinaj, Osamu Kanemura, Theodore John Kaczynski, David Kampi, Edward Kienholz, Kiumars Pourahmad, Tong Lam, Chris Marker, Marco Mazzi, Pınar Öğrenci, The Question of Funding, Walid Raad, Sara Rahbar, Ketty La Rocca, Christoph Schlingensief, Alessandro Scotti, La Société Spectrale, Dziga Vertov, and Ian Wilson.

=== Manifesto ===
In 2022, D.C.C.A. started a collaboration with Zeta Center for Contemporary Art and the Manifesto art collective, developing a series of long-term projects: Manifesto HIJACKING (2022), Manifesto DESERTION (2023), and Manifesto GREAT WAVE (2024).

== Collaborations ==
Over the years, DebatikCenter of Contemporary Art has collaborated with or shown works by many international artists, curators, and thinkers, often organizing their first showings in Albania. They include: Maryam Ashrafi, Tatiana Bazzichelli, Franco “Bifo” Berardi, Simon Critchley, Giovanni De Donà, Arben Dedja, Liu Ding, Marco Gatto, Gianluca Ghini, Barbad Golshiri, Yi Gu, Çiçek İlengiz, Vladan Jeremic, David Kampi, Elpida Karaba, Thomas Logoreci, Carol Yinghua Lu, Michael Marder, Luca Martignani, Théodore Mclauchlin, Viktor Misiano, Stuart Munro, Hadas Pe’ery, Nina Power, Theo Prodromidis, Rena Rädle, Ilya Repin, Abderrahim Rossetti, Arjan Serjanaj, Zef Shoshi, Ares Shporta, Jonas Staal, Ergin Zaloshnja, Despina Zefkili, and Mark A. Weitz.
