= Armando Lulaj =

Albanian artist

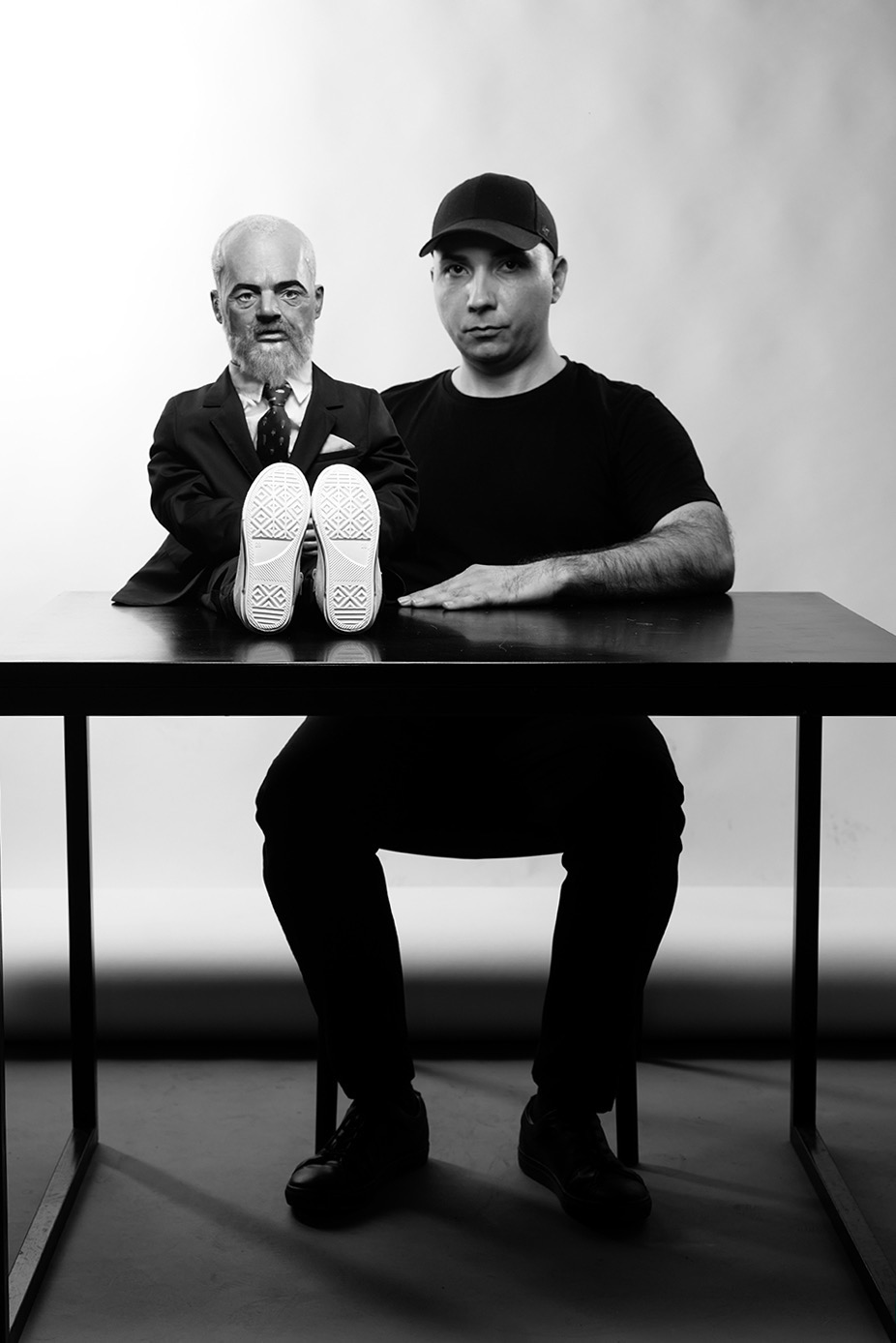
- Lulaj with his uncontrollable dummy in the play "2030, Launch into Contemporaneity", featuring Edi Rama PM of Albania.
- Born: June 24, 1980; Tirana, Albania.
- Education: Accademia di Belle Arti di Firenze and Accademia di Belle Arti di Bologna
- Known for: Contemporary art.

Armando Lulaj (born 1980 in Tirana) is an artist, playwright, filmmaker, and film producer, living and working in Tirana, Albania. His work “constantly negotiates the borders between economical power, fictional democracy and social disparity in a global context.” Lulaj is the founder of DebatikCenter of Contemporary Art. Lulaj has been called “one of the most prominent Albanian artists of his generation.” Since 2022, Lulaj is a member of the art collective Manifesto.

== Early life and education ==
After completing his studies at the Jordan Misja Artistic Lyceum of Tirana, he left Albania for Italy a week after the murder of Azem Hajdari, a member of the Albanian parliament, in 1998. After attending the Accademia di Belle Arti di Firenze for two years, his work “Walking Free in Harmony”, 2001, led to his expulsion from the academy. He opened his first solo show in Florence on September 11, 2001, curated by Pier Luigi Tazzi. He continued his studies at the Accademia di Belle Arti di Bologna. He returned to Albania in 2011.

== Works ==
He represented Albania at the 52nd Venice Biennale (2007) as part of a group show curated by Bonnie Clearwater. In 2015, he was selected to represent Albania at the 56th Venice Biennale with the solo show ‘’Albanian Trilogy: A Series of Devious Stratagems’’, curated by Marco Scotini.

=== Albanian Trilogy: A Series of Devious Stratagems ===
“Albanian Trilogy: A Series of Devious Stratagems” (2011–2015) is a cinematic project focusing on the Cold War period, in which Lulaj recreates informal archives based on state documents, his own memories and oral narratives regarding Albanian history. The trilogy comprises the films It Wears as it Grows (2011), NEVER (2012), and Recapitulation (2015).

An eponymous catalog, edited by Marco Scotini and with texts by Jonida Gashi, Boris Groys, Hou Hanru, Armando Lulaj, Edi Muka, Elidor Mëhilli, Marco Scotini, was published in 2015 by Sternberg Press to accompany the project at the occasion of the 56th Venice Biennale.

=== DebatikCenter of Contemporary Art (D.C.C.A.) ===
Lulaj founded the DebatikCenter of Contemporary Art in 2003 in Bologna. Since 2017, he leads the center together with Jonida Gashi and Pleurad Xhafa. D.C.C.A has been engaged in the production of Lulaj's film projects and the exhibitions and performances of art collective Manifesto.

== Exhibitions and film festivals ==
Lulaj's work is part of important public and private collections. He has participated in a number of international exhibitions and film festivals all over the world, such as: Prague Biennale (2003; 2007); Tirana Biennale (2005); Onufri 06, National Gallery, Tirana (2006); Bunker o no Bunker, Ramis Barquet Gallery, Mexico (2006); AYOR. No Man's Land, Hellenic Foundation for Culture, Athens (2006); Action Field Kodra, Boundary Lines, Thessaloniki (2006); Sweet Taboos, Mini Tirana Biennial, Apexart, New York (2006); 4th Gothenburg Biennial (2007); Italian Vision Film Festival, Cineteca di Bologna (2007); Laws of Relativity, Fondazione Sandretto Re Rebaudengo, Turin (2007); Opening Hours, Rebecca Camhi Gallery, Athens (2007); 8th Baltic Biennial of Contemporary Art, Szczecin (2009); 6th Berlin Biennale (2010); 63rd Berlin International Film Festival (2013); Utopian Days, Total Museum of Contemporary Art, Seoul (2014); Lost in Landscape, MART Museum, Rovereto (2014); Uninspired Architecture: Public Space and Public Memory in Albania, Sincresis Spazio d’arte, Empoli (2014); 56th Venice Biennale - Albanian Pavilion (2015); Workers Leaving the Studio. Looking Away from Socialist Realism, National Museum of Fine Arts, Tirana (2015); Cinéma du reel, Centre Pompidou, Paris (2016); The Whale That Was a Submarine, Ludwig Museum of Contemporary Art, Budapest (2016); Teatri i Gjelbërimit, FAB Gallery, Tirana (2016); RE.USE Scraps, Objects, Ecology in Contemporary Art, S. Caterina Museum, Treviso (2019); Bilbao, Artra Gallery, Milan (2020); South by Southwest, Gene Siskel Film Center, Chicago (2020); Material Zone 2, Alt Medium Gallery, Tokyo (2020); Open Air Festival, Haus der Kulturen der Welt, Berlin (2020); No Room for Manoeuvre 3, Artra Gallery, Milan, 2022; 34th Message to Man International Film Festival, St. Petersburg, 2023; The Archives of Decay and Other Stories, Zone of Contemporary Art, Academy of Art, Szczecin, 2024; f/\kt, ZETA Center for Contemporary Art, Tirana, 2024.

== Awards ==
- Onufri Prize (2006)
- Premio Carmen Silvestroni (2008)
- Premio Paolo Parati (2011)
- Marco Magnani Prize (2011)
- Albanian prize for Visual Arts “Danish Jukniu” (2014)

== Publications ==
- Albanian Trilogy, edited by Marco Scotini. Berlin: Sternberg Press, 2015. ISBN 9783956791468
- Control. Cinisello Balsamo: Silvana Editoriale, 2019 (with Marco Mazzi). ISBN 9788836645169
- Broken Narrative: The Politics of Contemporary Art in Albania. Prefaces by Jonida Gashi and Osamu Kanemura. Earth: punctum books, 2021 (with Marco Mazzi). ISBN 978-1685710583
- fʌkt: Një kundërhistori e së tashmes. Preface by Sonja Lau. Translated by Alfred Bushi. Tirana: Pika pa sipërfaqe, 2022 (with Marco Mazzi). ISBN 9789928373106
