= List of art galleries in Albania =

This is a list of art galleries, paint studios, cultural centers and other institutions operating in Albania.

== National Art Institutions ==
- National Art Gallery of Albania
- National Museum of Photography (Marubi)

== Art Galleries and Institutions ==
- Albanian Visual Arts Network
- Bazament Art Space
- Gjikondi Art Gallery
- Contemporary Art Platform Harabel
- Cultural Center Tirana
- DebatikCenter of Contemporary Art (DCCA)
- Gallery of Contemporary Art Tirana (GOCAT)
- NAAN Gallery
- Tirana Art Lab
- Zenit Art Gallery
- ZETA Center for Contemporary Art

== Foreign Art Institutions ==
- Alliance Française in Tirana
- Cultural Center Kontakt Austria
- Deutschezentrum
- Italian Cultural Institute

== Painter studios ==
- Amos paint studio
- Kërpaçi paint studio
- Tica paint studio
- Xhevdet Dada paint studio
- Zaya paint studio

== See also ==
- List of museums in Albania
