= Jonida Gashi =

Jonida Gashi (born in 1984 in Fier) is an Albanian cultural theorist and senior researcher at the Centre for Art Studies at the Academy of Sciences of Albania.

== Career ==
She completed her MRes and PhD in Humanities and Cultural Studies at the London Consortium, University of London. Gashi is editor-in-chief of the journal Art Studies, published annually by the Academy of Albanological Studies.

Gashi is specialized in cinema and moving image art during the Albanian communist period. She has published about the cinematic work of Albanian artist Armando Lulaj, communist show trials, and the politics or exhibiting communist archives.

As one of the directors of the DebatikCenter of Contemporary Art, Gashi led the open-letter campaign against the demolition of Albanian National Theatre, leading to publications in Albanian, French, Italian, and English, gathering hundreds of signatures. She has linked the artwashing tactics of the Edi Rama government in Albania directly to the eventual destruction of the theater.
