= Linda George =

Linda or Lynda George may refer to:

- Linda George (Australian singer), Australian pop singer popular in the 1970s
- Linda George (Assyrian singer), Assyrian-American pop singer popular in the 1980s–2010s
- Lynda Day George, American television actress popular in the 1960s and 1970s
- Linda K. George (born 1947), American sociologist and gerontologist
