= Carol Aneshensel =

American sociologist

Carol Aneshensel (1947-June 14, 2019) was an American sociologist. She specialized in the sociology of mental health, focusing especially on how social inequalities lead to corresponding disparities in mental health. She was professor and vice chair for the Department of Community Health Sciences in the School of Public Health at University of California, Los Angeles (UCLA), before becoming professor emeritus.

== Education ==
Aneshensel received her B.S. in Industrial and Labor Relations and an M.A. and a Ph.D. in sociology at Cornell University.

== Work ==
Aneshensel specialized in mental health and medical sociology. Her research investigated connections between how society is organized and how that relates to mental health of its citizens, specifically focusing on the way that social inequalities around gender, socioeconomic status, race/ethnicity, and age lead to differences in mental health along those differentiators. She worked with large survey samples and utilizes complex statistical analysis of data spanning multiple life stages of subjects.

Aneshensel studied the epidemiology of depression and help-seeking behavior under a grant from the National Institute of Mental Health (1984–1987). Under continued support from NIMH, she studied models of ethnicity and depression over time, (1987–1992), sources of stress and depressive symptoms in adolescents (1988–1992), and social origins and emotional impact of adolescent stress (1992–1997). She was funded by the California Department of Health Services, Alzheimer's Disease to research the long-term impact of family caregiving (1999–2000). She followed this by a study of neighborhood, socioeconomic status, and adolescent distress beginning in 2000, and later neighborhood SES and emotional distress in old age, both supported by grants from NIMH.

== Publications ==
She wrote and edited several books, such as the Handbook of the Sociology of Mental Health and Theory-Based Data Analysis for the Social Sciences. Aneshensel also published numerous papers.

== Awards and honors ==
Reuters named her as a highly cited scientist in 2001, and she is on the Institute for Scientific Information's Highly Cited Researchers List. Aneshensel's book, Theory-Based Data Analysis for the Social Sciences, received honorable mention for best publication in 2003 from the Sociology of Mental Health section of the American Sociological Association (ASA).

Aneshensel received the ASA's Leonard I. Pearlin Award for Distinguished Contributions to the Sociological Study of Mental Health in 2004

She won the ASA's Leo G. Reeder Award for Distinguished Contribution to Medical Sociology in 2008.
