= ZETA Center for Contemporary Art =

Exhibition space in Albania

The Zeta Center for Contemporary Art (also styled ZETA), founded in 2007 by Valentina Koça, is an Albanian non-profit exhibition space.

On July 4, 2024, Koça received the Decoration of Honour in Gold for Services to the Republic of Austria “for her excellent work in promoting cultural relations between Austria and Albania, supporting artists particularly from Salzburg and Styria in the framework of cultural partnership programmes (artists’ residencies) with Albania.”

== Exhibitions and artists ==
One of the longest standing independent art spaces in Tirana, ZETA plays a key role in exhibiting contemporary artists from Albania. Since its opening, it has organized solo shows of Edi Hila (2007, 2010, 2011), Ali Oseku (2008), Lumturi Blloshmi (2009), Ardian Isufi (2010), Gazmend Leka (2011, 2014), Jutta Benzenberg (2011), Stefano Romano (2011, 2018, 2021), Lekë Tasi (2012), Leonard Qylafi (2013, 2016, 2022), Enkelejd Zonja (2014), Dritan Hyska (2014), Matilda Odobashi (2014), Yllka Gjollesha (2015), Andi Nallbani (2015), Shpëtim Kerçova (2015), Gentian Shkurti (2016), Blerta Hoçia (2016), Ilir Kaso (2017), Remijon Pronja (2017), Sead Kazanxhiu (2018), Lek M. Gjeloshi (2018), Alketa Ramaj (2019), Fani Zguro (2019), Pleurad Xhafa (2022), Olson Lamaj (2023), Alban Hajdinaj (2023), Ergin Zaloshnja (2023), Theo Napoloni (2024), Armando Lulaj (2024), and others. Furthermore, ZETA has also regularly hosts curated group shows with Albanian and international artists.

== Collaborations and residencies ==
Since 2022, ZETA started the collaboration with DebatikCenter of Contemporary Art and has become the headquarters for the Manifesto art collective, of which ZETA founder Valentina Koça is also a member. The Manifesto art collective has developed a series of projects exhibited at ZETA: Manifesto Hijacking (2022), Manifesto Desertion (2023), and Manifesto Great Wave (2024).

== Ardhje Award ==
The Ardhje Award is an annual award for young visual artists from Albania up to 35 years. Initially initiated by TICA – Tirana Institute of Contemporary Art in 2005, the award has been organized by ZETA since 2008. The Ardhje Award is part of the regional network YVVA (The Young Visual Artists Awards in Central and South Eastern Europe).

Previous winners:

- 2007: Irgin Sena
- 2008: Leonard Qylafi
- 2009: Luçjan Bedeni
- 2010: Dritan Hyska
- 2011: Ledia Kostandini
- 2012: Olson Lamaj
- 2013: Alketa Ramaj
- 2014: Pleurad Xhafa
- 2016: Lek M. Gjeloshi
- 2018: Remijon Pronja
- 2019: Endri Dani
- 2020: Lori Lako
- 2021: Fatlum Doçi
- 2022: Sead Kazanxhiu
- 2023: Eros Dibra
- 2024: Gerta Xhaferaj
- 2025: Olsi Hoxha
