= National Theatre of Albania protests =

2018–2020 protests in Tirana, Albania

National Theatre Protest in Albania
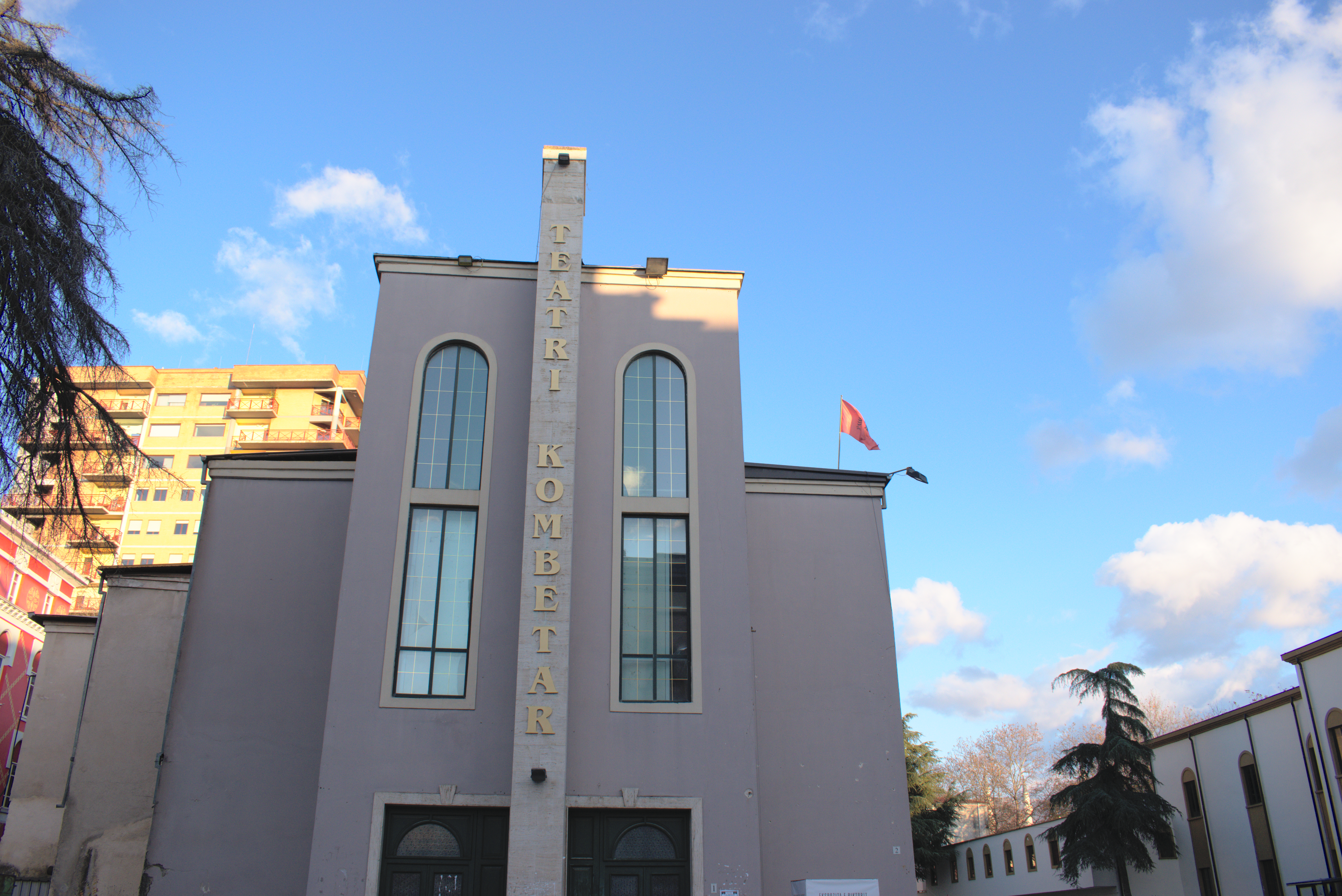
- The building of the National Theatre in Tirana, built in 1939.
- Date: 8 February 2018 – 17 May 2020
- Location: Tirana, Albania
- Caused by: Albanian Government's plan to demolish the National Theatre's building
- Goals: Annulation of the government plan; Restoration of the building; Better working conditions for artists
- Methods: Street protests; Street Occupations; Online activism

Parties
(Albania) Albanian artists	Government of Albania; Ministry of Culture; Municipality of Tirana

Lead figures
(Albania) Collective leadership	(Albania) Edi Rama (Albania) Elva Margariti (Albania) Erion Veliaj

For two years, artists and activists in Tirana, Albania, demonstrated to protect the historic National Theatre building from being demolished.

Built in 1939, during the early years of Italian rule, Albania's National Theatre worked as a cinema until the end of the Second World War, when a stage replaced the former screen.

In 2018, due to the lack of maintenance and investments over the years, the government announced a plan to demolish the National Theatre's building and send the artists into an alternative stage until the new theatre would be built in the same place. In March 2018, Prime Minister Edi Rama revealed Bjarke Ingels's design for the new National Theater, the construction of which would be granted through a special law to a private company. This law was later criticized by the EU as a violation of the Stabilisation and Association Process. The government, in return, claimed it had no money for the project.

The artists started a petition, firstly signed by more than 90 artists and started to gather daily at the public square in front of the theatre to protest the demolition. After many citizens joined the protest, it was discovered that the public property where the theatre stands today, would be sold to a private investor, who planned at that time to build high-rise buildings together with a new theatre. The new theater would cover a much smaller part of the now public property.

The then Minister of Culture, Mirela Kumbaro, was accused of trying to destroy heritage and demolish the theatre for private interests of investors with close ties with government officials.

The Association of Albanian Architects also made a declaration opposing the demolition of the theatre, stressing the historical and aesthetic value of its rationalist architecture.

Following student protests, PM Edi Rama decided to reshuffle his cabinet and replaced 8 ministers, including the Minister of Culture Mirela Kumbaro, a decision applauded by the artist's community.

As of January 2019, Architecture firm Bjarke Ingels Group of Danish architect Bjarke Ingels, has dropped the construction project of the National Theater. The municipality opened a new tender call, but since then it hasn't made any announcement on how the procedure is going or who is applying for it.

Regardless of constant protest by Albanian artists together with the political opposition, the demolition of the National Theatre of Albania started approximately on 4:30 am of 17 May 2020. The area was overrun by the State Police as they forcibly evacuated every person in the area protesting and detained many artists and high members of the Albanian opposition. Soon after the demolition started, people started gathering in the main boulevard just before the Ministry of Internal Affairs and the National Theatre to protest its demolition. This protest led to numerous other detainments due to the prohibition of gatherings and protests as per COVID-19 restrictions by the Government.

An open letter drafted by members of the DebatikCenter of Contemporary Art in the aftermath of the demolition, accusing the Rama government of artwashing, gathered hundreds of signatures and was published in Albanian, French, Italian, and English.

== The Case in the Constitutional Court ==
On 24 July 2019, after two days of activists clashing with police forces who surrounded the theatre and tried to forcibly evict the Alliance activists from the surroundings of the theatre, the President of Albania Ilir Meta decided to file a case in the Constitutional Court to stop the attempt for the demolition of the National Theatre building. While addressing the media, he considered the special law for the destruction of the theater as a symbol where, like never before, a national cultural constitutional crime is performed in full harmony and all this only in interest what I can call, the opposite of the rule of law, in favor of the rule of oligarchs.

On 30 December the Constitutional Court ruled to consider Meta's request to repeal the special law and asked several institutions involved in the case to send their arguments for drafting and adopting this special law. The deadline for these institutions to respond is January 22, 2020.

== List of Endangered monuments ==
Activists of the Alliance for the Protection of the Theatre, also applied to include the National Theatre in the list of the 7 most endangered European heritage sites for 2020 – a programme run by Europa Nostra, which is a Europe-wide heritage organization. The Theatre was shortlisted on the list of the 14 most endangered monuments in Europe, and the final results is expected to come out by March 2020.

In July 2019, Europa Nostra urged the Albanian Government to save the National Theatre from demolition, considering it as one of the most prominent cultural centers in Tirana and an important social and public space in the city.

In May 2020, more than 20 Members of the European Parliament, including Michael Gahler, David Lega, Johann Wadephul, Doris Pack and Ramona Strugariu, condemned the planned demolition of the historical building. The President of the European Council, Donald Tusk, along with the Swedish, German and British Embassies in Tirana, spoke against it as well.

== Demolition of the National Theatre Building ==
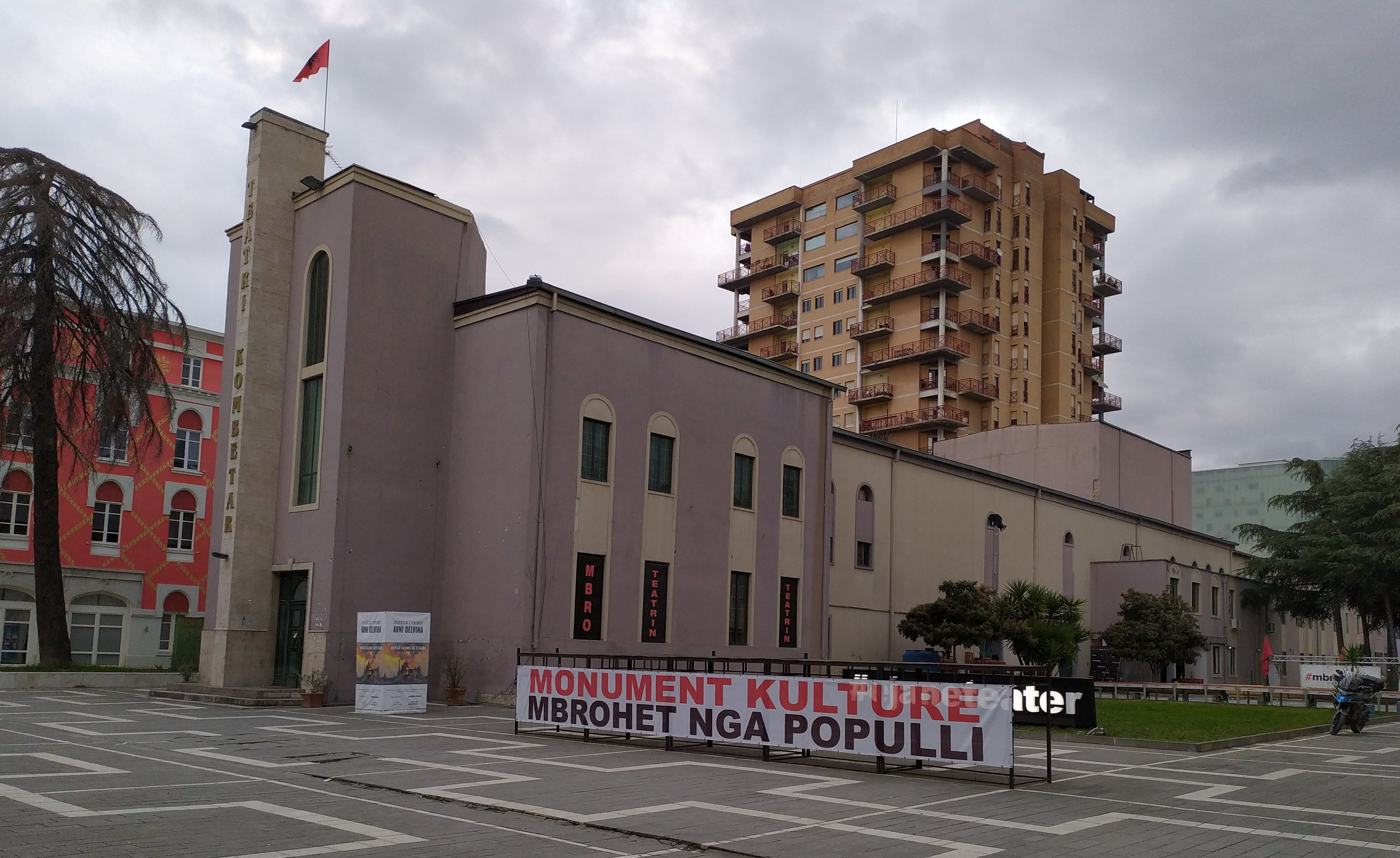
Banner outside the National Theater of Albania placed by the protestors opposing the demolition of the building in favour of a new bulging complex that would replace it and add also shopping facilities as claimed by the protesters.

On the early morning of May 17 2020, Albanian authorities began demolishing the national theatre building. Hundreds of special police forces showed up before dawn and removed members of the Alliance to Protect the Theatre and activists occupying the theatre building, by using pepper spray. Diggers then began demolishing its front column, bearing the words “National Theatre”.

This decision drew the widespread condemnation from several local activists, opposition political parties and artists against the Municipality of Tirana and the Albanian government. Europa Nostra called the demolition of the theatre as "illegal' and "against the rule of law". The Delegation of EU in Albania voiced their concern regarding the lack of dialogue between the authorities and activists before the demolition took place. In Kosovo, 10 theatres cancelled their performances in protest of the demolition.

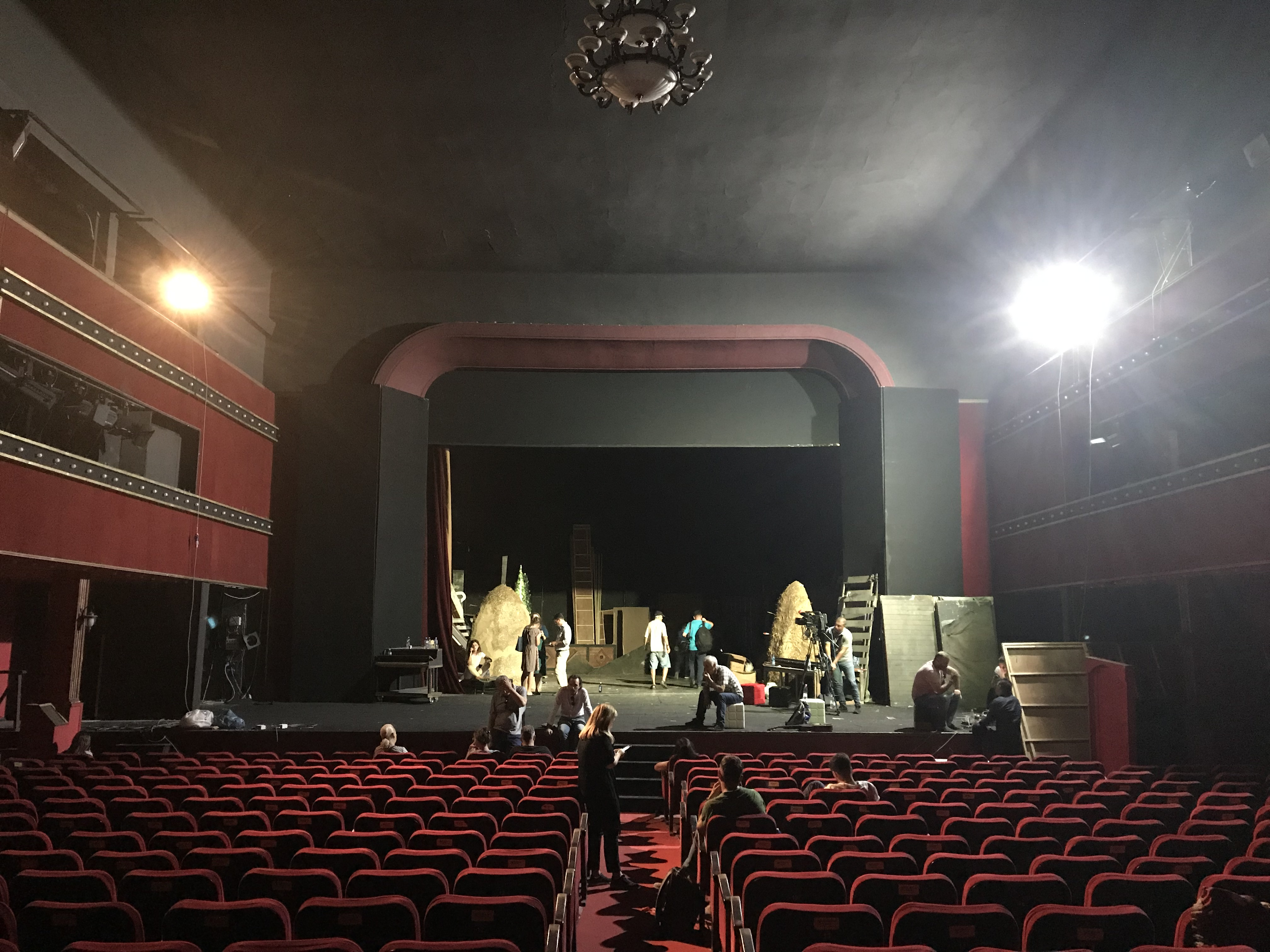
National Theatre of Albania photographed the day of the occupation by artists and actors

== Aftermath ==
On the 5th of May, 2023, the Tirana Municipal Council approved the transfer of a 1,266 sq.m plot next to the National Theater to Fusha, as part of a deal involving 50% of the floor space in any future constructions on the site. This decision aligned with a proposal made by Shkëlqim Fusha as early as 2020. However, in March 2024, it came to light that Fusha intended to construct a 23-story building on the property, contradicting previous guarantees made by Prime Minister Rama and Mayor Veliaj.
