= List of museums in Albania =

This is a list of museums in Albania. In 2017, museums in the country welcomed 200,986 visitors. Most museums are closed on Mondays.

== List of museums in Albania ==
=== Archaeological museums ===
- National Archaeological Museum
- Archaeological Museum of Durrës
- Archaeological Museum of Butrint
- Archaeological Museum of Apolonia
- Archaeological Museum of Korçë
- Archaeological Museum of Lezhë
- Archaeological Museum of Saranda
- Museum of Kamenica Tumulus

=== Ethnographic museums ===
- Ethnographic Museum of Berat
- Ethnographic Museum of Krujë
- Ethnographic Museum of Elbasan
- Ethnographic Museum of Vlorë
- Ethnographic Museum of Durrës
- Ethnographic Museum of Kukës
- Ethnographic Museum of Gjirokastër
- Ethnographic Museum of Kavajë
- Museum of Rozafa Castle

=== History museums ===
- National History Museum
- Skanderbeg Museum
- Congress of Lushnjë Museum
- National Museum of Education
- Museum of National Independence
- History Museum of Shkodër
- History Museum of Fier
- History Museum of Lushnjë
- Historical Relics Museum of Vlorë
- Memorial Museum of Skanderbeg
- History Museum of Mat
- Museum of Pogradec
- Museum of Gramsh
- Bunk'Art 1
- Bunk'Art 2
- Museum of Secret Surveillance
- Communist Crimes Museum
- Museum of LANÇ
- Armed Forces Museum
- Kastrioti Museum of Sinë
- Woman's Museum
- Hebrew Museum

=== Arts museums ===
- National Museum of Fine Arts
- Marubi National Museum of Photography
- National Museum of Medieval Art
- Bratko Museum of Oriental Art
- Onufri Iconographic Museum
- Mezuraj Museum
- Gjon Mili Museum
- Home of Poliphony

=== Collections museums ===
- Natural Sciences Museum
- Bank of Albania Museum
- Museum of Albanian Stamp
- National Guard Museum
- National Armaments Museum
- Clocks Museum
- Kadare Studio Home

=== Cult museums ===
- Sapa Diocese Museum
- Shkodër-Pult Diocese Museum
- Bektashi Museum

== See also ==
- List of libraries in Albania
- List of archives in Albania
- List of art galleries in Albania
- List of museums by country
