= Bratko Museum of Oriental Art =

Coordinates: 40.612708°N 20.784628°E

- Muzeu i Artit Oriental "Bratko"
- Established: June 2003
- Location: Korçë, Albania
- Type: Art museum
- Collections: Asian art
- Collection size: 432 objects
- Directors: Jonilda Trebicka, Director general
- Architect: Kliti Kallamata

The Bratko Museum of Oriental Art (Albanian: Muzeu i Artit Oriental "Bratko") is an Albanian national museum dedicated to Asian art in Korçë, Albania. The museum was established and opened in June 2003, thus fulfilling the dream of George Dimitri Boria, an Albanian-American photographer, who donated his own collection of Asian art to the museum. Collection which Boria began during his 14 years in post-war Japan as photographer for General Douglas MacArthur, and which continued as a lifelong passion embracing all countries and cultures of the Orient. The name "Bratko" Museum was chosen by G.D. Boria in memory of her beloved mother, Viktoria Bratko, who waited for him in Korca.

The "Bratko" Museum serves as a monument to an extraordinary man, his family, and his native land.

== Building ==
The architecture of the new museum is a startling, new contribution to the variety of buildings already represented in Albania. Its style is avant-garde while reflecting elements of traditional architectures of Asia. As such, the museum itself is a contemporary masterpiece.

== History ==
The idea of opening the Museum was born around 1985 by G.D Boria who provided to the Albanian state of that period his own collection, which he had collected during the post-war years. In 1990 G.D Boria died entrusting the realization of this dream to his American cousin, Laura Bratko Schlesinger. The realization of his dream to open a museum dedicated to Asian art was made possible only in the early 2000s when the Municipality of Korca offered the site for the museum's construction.

The completion of the works was completed in 2003 and the museum was opened in June to the same year under the name of the Museum of Oriental Art "Bratko", thus becoming the first Asian art museum in the Balkan region.

The museum was awarded the Japanese Foreign Minister’s Commendation for their contributions to promotion of Japanese culture in Albania on 1 December 2020.

== See also ==
- National Museum of Medieval Art (Albania)
- List of museums in Albania
