= Ethnographic Museum of Kavajë =

Museum in Kavajë, Albania

- Muzeu Etnografik i Kavajës
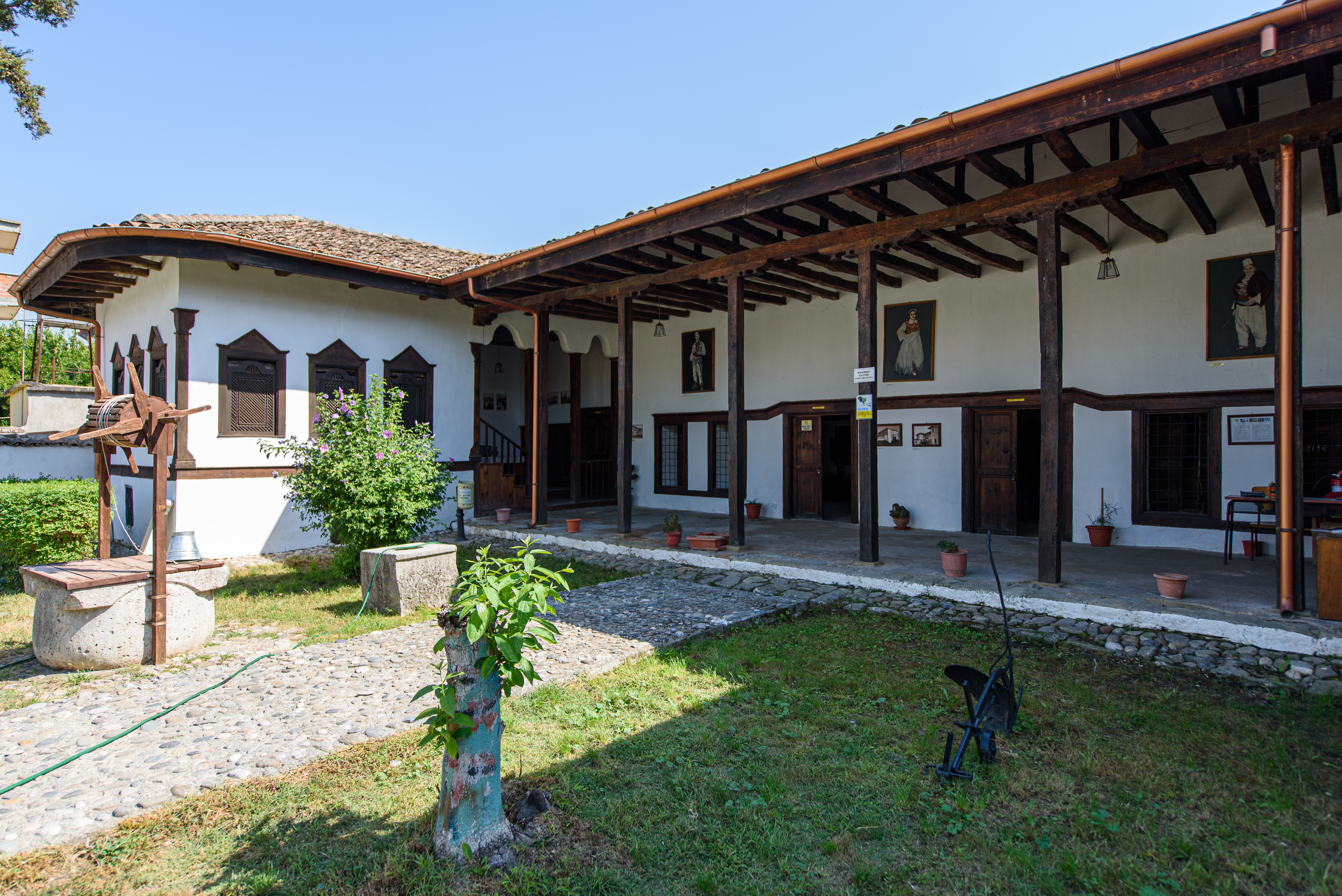
- A front yard view of the museum
- Established: 1971
- Location: Rruga "Mehmet Babamusta, 2501 Kavajë, Albania
- Coordinates: 41°10′49″N 19°33′20″E
- Type: Ethnographic
- Collections: Various craft works
- Collection size: 810
- Owner: Bashkia Kavajë

Site notes
- Architectural style: Ottoman style

Cultural Monument of Albania
- Type: Cultural
- Criteria: Cat. I
- Designated: 10 June 1973
- Reference no.: 1886

The Ethnographic Museum of Kavajë (Albanian: Muzeu Etnografik i Kavajës) (completed in 1971) was built on a restored building with a hajat or gallery, the type of which was widespread throughout 18th century Albania. Its architectonic origin however dates back to late antiquity in the typology of a villa rustica, commonly present in the region. After the full restoration of the building, the newly formed museum was given the status of a cultural monument. The managing group which programmed the conceptual orientation and realisation of the museum was made up of the most reputable authorities of the time in the studies of ethnography. The main characteristic of the museum's ethnographic fund is defined by the variety of its objects and their diverse origin. Craft works composed in ceramic, copper and textiles from local craftsmen representing the city and the region are present for display. So is a large collection of works from the Northern, North-Eastern and Southern regions of Albania. The elements of the traditional costumes from these regions are distinguished for their level of mastery and finesse, for the richness of the ornaments and symbols merged into geometric, zoomorphic and anthropomorphic forms.

== See also ==
- List of museums in Albania
