= Horizontal mobility =

Social status concept

Horizontal mobility is the mobility of the individual or group in the same social class, in the same situation category, without changing the level of power or status. Horizontal mobility, which is a type of social mobility, refers to the change of physical space or profession without changes in the economic situation, prestige, and lifestyle of the individual, or the forward or backward movement from one similar group or status to another.

== Definition ==
Pitirim Sorokin defines horizontal mobility as a change in religious, regional, political, or other horizontal shifts without any change in vertical position.According to Andrew W. Lind, horizontal mobility occurs when a person changes their profession, but their social status remains unchanged. E.g. if a doctor switches from a job in health care to teaching in medical school, the profession changes, but dignity and social status remain the same. According to Cameron Anderson, social status is the level of social value that a person is considered to have. The American sociologist Linda K. George listed the social status factors in horizontal mobility as work, wealth, success, education, ethnicity, and marital status.

== Timeline ==
Pitirim Sorokin defined social mobility between positions as two types: vertical and horizontal. According to Sorokin, the first period in which horizontal mobility tended to increase was the second half of the nineteenth century. Academic studies have been carried out on the direction of the movement that will maintain and improve this distinction made by Sorokin. The vertical or horizontal social mobility that a person shows in his own life is called intragenerational mobility. According to Weber, when mobility changes, up or down, class conflicts lose their central importance and group solidarity gives way to competition. According to the conflict theorists, the diversification of social roles due to competition and industrialization led to the emergence of horizontal mobility.

== Metrology ==
Horizontal mobility is one of the quantitative research methods. Werrett Wallace Charters conducted a horizontal mobility study on American teachers called "The Social Background of Teaching". John W. Alspaugh from the University of Missouri referred to the Charters, in his research called An Index of Teacher Horizontal Mobility, "The properties of horizontal mobility and attempting to measure it arose from an interest in testing research hypotheses regarding the mobility of various types of educators." Alspaugh, developed formulas for measuring the horizontal mobility of teachers.

=== Works ===
==== Teacher mobility study ====
The goal of Alspaugh's study was to develop an index of teacher mobility that would be used as research.

Years	Teachers	Teacher mobility table														
3	1			●												
2	2		●								●			●		
1	3		●													
MOVES		1	2	3	4	5	6	7	8	9	10	11	12	13	14	15
MOVES		Teacher 1 changed jobs only once, at the end of the third year. Teacher 2 changed jobs three times at the end of the second, tenth, and thirteenth years. Teacher 3 changed jobs at the end of the second and fourth years. Teacher 1 is the least mobile and teacher 2 is the most mobile.														

For the mobility index to be valid, the trainer must have accepted the general mobility concept. The table above is a ranking of the 3 career orders from least to most.

==== The Power Elite ====
The Power Elite is a book published in 1956 by the American sociologist C. Wright Mills. In this book, Mills dealt with the horizontal mobility of the relationship between the political, military and economic elites. Mills has written that horizontal mobility moves within and between three institutional structures.
