= National Museum of Education (Albania) =

- Muzeu Kombëtar i Arsimit
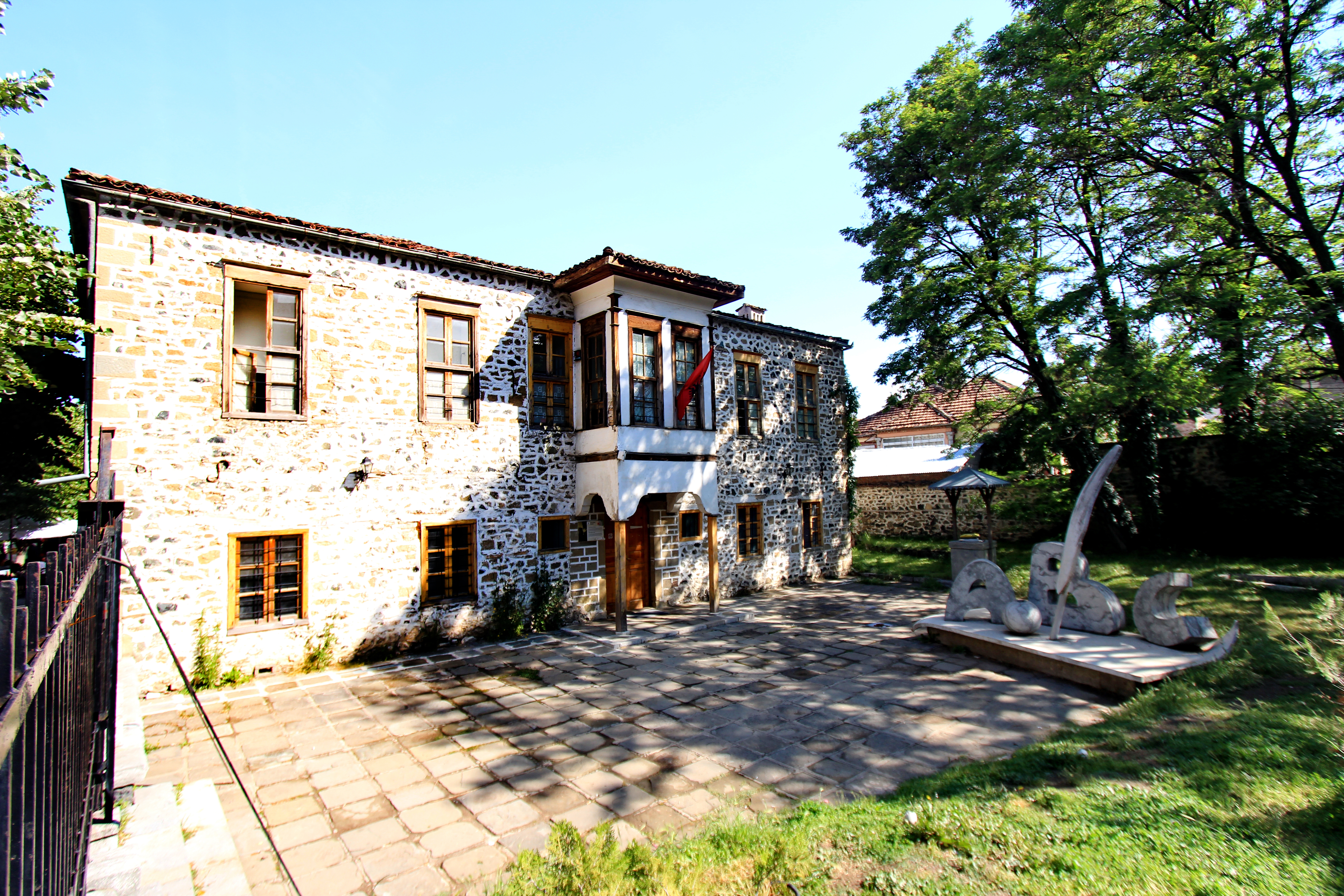
- Established: 7 March 1887 as school 1967 as museum
- Location: Korçë, Albania
- Coordinates: 40°37′00″N 20°46′47″E
- Type: Historical museum; Education Museum
- Director: Niko Kotherja

The National Museum of Education (Albanian: Muzeu Kombëtar i Arsimit) is a national museum located in Korçë, Albania. The museum is set up in the building where the March 7, 1887 opened the first Albanian school, otherwise known as Mësonjëtorja. It contains the history of Albanian writing and Albanian publications, such as the first Albanian alphabet written by patriot Naum Veqilharxhi and the second Albanian alphabet written by Kostandin Kristoforidhi. There are also pictures and photos of prominent patriots who contributed to the opening of the school, such as Pandeli Sotiri, Petro Nini Luarasi and Nuçi Naçi.

== Building ==
The National Museum of Education is located in the building where the first school of Albanian language was opened (on 7 March 1887), or as otherwise known as "Mësonjëtorja e Parë Shqipe" (transl. First Albanian School). The building itself dates back to the 1840s, the house retains many of its original features and today it holds the status as "Monument of Culture" in Albania. Since the time of its construction, the building has been mostly in public function towards the society. The building was the home of the patriot of Korçë, Diamanti Tërpo, who donated the building to the Albanian school. From 1887 to 1902 there was "Mësonjëtorja", where it was later administered by Ottoman authorities, which used the building as a prison until the Young Turk Revolution, where local Albanians took over again the administration of the building, to reopen the Albanian school and to set up the musical and patriotic band called "Banda e Lirisë" on 1 October 1908. As a school, the building continued until 1967, the year when it was given the function as a museum space with the name of National Museum of Education, as well as still called today.

== Exhibits and collections ==
The museum offers interesting material for visitors, the historic journey of the first Albanian school, such as photographic portraits of the founders, contributors, directors and its pupils in years. There are also exposed books and texts used by its pupils and alumni at "Mësonjëtorja" time, objects used by Albanian patriots and linguists who have been part of school history. In the museum is improvised the office of the Director of Mësonjëtorja, which is documented in the manuscript memoirs of one of its firstest directors, Nuçi Naçi. The office room serves as a separate pavilion and there it is also placed the "Libri i Vizitorëve" (transl. Visitors Book) where visitors and tourists can leave their notes on their impressions to the museum.

In the museum there are exhibited two of the firstest editions of the Albanian alphabet (in 1844 and 1845), published by Naum Haxhi Llazar Bredhi or more commonly known as Naum Veqilharxhi. These alphabets were distributed in Southern Albania, especially in the Korçë and Përmet areas.

== See also ==
- List of museums in Albania
- History of Albania
- Tourism in Albania
