= Social mobility =

Mobility to move social classes

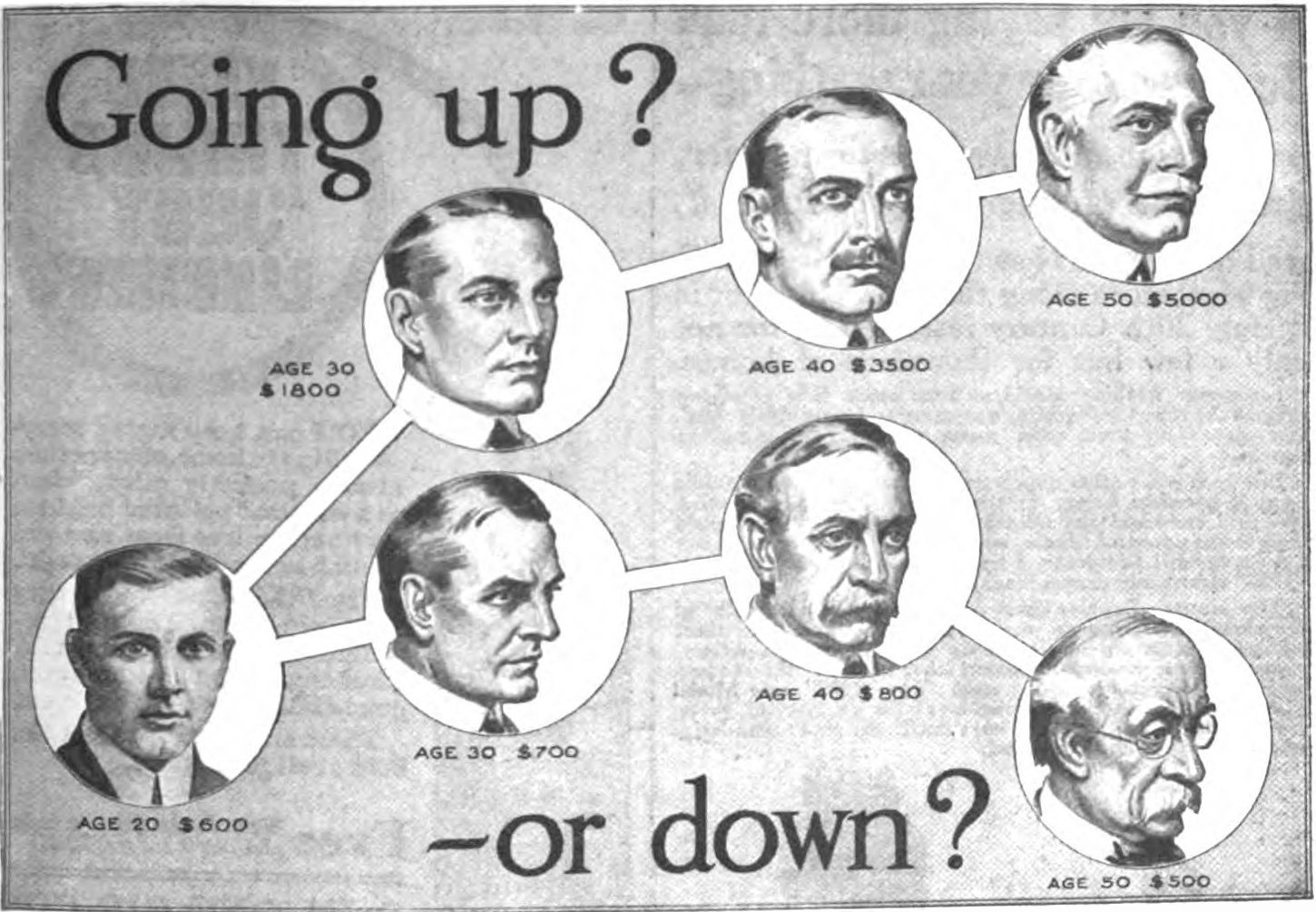
Illustration from a 1916 advertisement for a vocational school in the back of a US magazine. Education has been seen as a key to social mobility and the advertisement appealed to Americans' belief in the possibility of self-betterment as well as threatening the consequences of downward mobility in the great income inequality existing during the Industrial Revolution.

Social mobility is the movement of people within or between social classes in a society. It is a change in social status relative to one's initial status in a given society. This movement occurs between layers or tiers in an open system of social stratification. Open stratification systems are those in which at least some value is given to achieved status characteristics in a society. Movement can be upward or downward. Markers for social mobility such as education and class, are used to predict, discuss, and learn more about movement in society.

== Typology ==
Mobility is most often measured in terms of change in economic mobility such as changes in income or wealth. Occupation is another measure used in mobility research. Mobility may be intragenerational, within the same generation or intergenerational, between different generations. The idea of intergenerational mobility is one of the fundamental features of the "American Dream" even though there is less such mobility in the United States of America than almost all other OECD countries.

=== Social status and social class ===
Social mobility depends heavily on the overall structure of social statuses and occupations in society. Education offers an opportunity for upward social mobility and higher social status. However, social stratification and high wealth inequality affect educational opportunities and outcomes. Social class and a family's socioeconomic status influence a child's chances for obtaining a quality education and succeeding in life. By age five, low-, middle-, and upper-class children show significant differences in cognitive and noncognitive skills. According to a 2013 Brookings Institution report on social mobility:

Among older children, evidence suggests that the gap between high- and low-income primary- and secondary-school students has increased by almost 40 percent over the past thirty years. These differences persist and widen into young adulthood and beyond. As the gap in K–12 test scores between high- and low-income students grows, so does the gap in college graduation rates between the rich and the poor. Although the college graduation rate among the poorest households increased by about 4 percentage points between those born in the early 1960s and those born in the early 1980s, it rose by almost 20 percentage points for the wealthiest households over the same period.

Between 1975 and 2011, average family income and social status have both decreased for the bottom third of children. The 5th percentile of children and their families have seen up to a 60% decrease in average family income. The wealth gap between the rich and the poor, the upper and lower class, continues to increase as more middle-class people get poorer and the lower-class get even poorer. A child born to parents in the lowest-income quintile is more than 10 times as likely to end up in the lowest quintile as an adult as a child born to parents in the highest quintile. A child born to parents in the highest quintile is five times more likely to end up in the highest quintile than the lowest.

=== Class cultures and social networks ===
These dimensions of social mobility can be classified by the types of capital that drive changes in mobility. Cultural capital, a term coined by French sociologist Pierre Bourdieu distinguishes between the economic and cultural aspects of class. Bourdieu described three types of capital that place a person in a certain social category: economic capital; social capital; and cultural capital.

Economic capital includes economic resources such as cash, credit, and other material assets. Social capital includes resources one gains through group membership, networks of influence, relationships, and support from others.

Cultural capital is any advantage a person has that gives them higher status in society, such as education, skills, or other forms of knowledge. Usually, people with all three types of capital have a high status in society. Bourdieu found that upper-class culture is oriented more toward formal reasoning and abstract thought. The lower social class is geared more towards matters of facts and the necessities of life. He also found that the environment in which a person develops strongly affects the cultural resources a person will have.

The cultural resources a person has obtained can heavily influence a child's educational success. Students raised under the concerted cultivation approach have "an emerging sense of entitlement," which leads them to ask teachers more questions and be more active students, causing teachers to favor them. This child-rearing approach, which creates positive interactions in the classroom environment, is in contrast with the natural growth approach to child-rearing. In this approach, more common among working-class families, parents do not focus on developing their children's individual talents and speak to their children in directives. Children raised this way are less likely to question or challenge adults, and conflict can arise between home and school child-rearing practices. Children raised this way are less inclined to participate in the classroom and less likely to go out of their way to interact positively with teachers and build relationships.

In the United States, researchers have linked minority underperformance in schools to a lack of cultural resources, cultural capital, social capital, and economic capital, yet inconsistencies persist even after accounting for these variables. "Once admitted to institutions of higher education," wrote William Bowen and Derek Bok in a 1998 book, The Shape of the River, "African Americans and Latinos continued to underperform relative to their white and Asian counterparts, earning lower grades, progressing at a slower rate and dropping out at higher rates. These differentials persisted even after controlling for SAT scores and family socioeconomic status".

The theory of capital deficiency is among the most recognized academic explanations for minority underperformance. College-educated parents who have high levels of human capital invest in their children to maximize future success, from reading to them at night to developing a better understanding of the school system, which makes them less deferential to teachers and school authorities. Research also shows that well-educated black parents are less able to transmit human capital to their children when compared to their white counterparts.

== Markers ==
=== Education ===
Systems of stratification can hinder or enable social mobility. Education is a tool people use to move from one stratum to another. Higher education policies have worked to establish and reinforce stratification.

Researchers examined education's role in the association between ability and social class attainment across three generations and found that social class of origin predicts educational attainment in both participants' and offspring generations. Father's social class and participant's social class held the same importance in predicting offspring educational attainment—effect across two generations. Social classes are not directly linked across generations, but within each generation, educational attainment predicts social class.

Both social class attainment and social mobility are influenced by pre-existing levels of mental ability. Education is frequently seen as a strong driver of social mobility, though today 75% of all entering freshmen at top-tier American institutions come from the uppermost socioeconomic quartile. A family's class determines the amount of investment and involvement parents have in their children's educational abilities and success from their earliest years of life, leaving low-income students with less chance for academic success due to the effects that the common parenting style of the lower and working-class have on their outlook on and success in education. In addition, in recent years, high-income families have increased spending on their children's education. In 2013, high-income families paid seven times as much for education as low-income families. The increase in spending on education may have increased college graduation rates for high-income families.

Some debate exists over how important educational attainment is for social mobility. A substantial body of literature argues that social origins have a direct effect that educational attainment alone cannot overcome. Other evidence suggests that, using a sufficiently fine-grained measure of educational attainment, including such factors as university status and field of study, education fully explains any apparent link between social origins and access to top class jobs.

=== Housing ===
A mixed-income housing development includes diverse housing types, such as apartments, townhouses, and single-family homes, for people with a range of income levels. A common assumption is that mixed housing will help low-socioeconomic-status people gain resources and social connections to move up the social ladder. Other possible effects of mixed housing include positive behavioral changes, improved sanitation, and safer living conditions for low-socioeconomic-status residents. This is because richer people are more likely to demand higher quality residencies, schools, and infrastructure.

However, investigations of mixed housing show that such developments do not promote or facilitate upward social mobility. Instead of developing complex relationships, mixed-housing residents of different socioeconomic statuses tend to have casual conversations and keep to themselves. People with a low socioeconomic status consider relationships to be more salient than the type of neighborhood they live in to their prospects of moving up the social ladder. This is partly because their income is often still very low. These strong relationships provide the support they need to meet monthly expenses, but that support still isn't enough to promote relative mobility upward.

=== Race ===
Race as an influencer on social mobility stems from colonial times. There has been discussion as to whether race can still hinder an individual's chances at upward mobility or whether class has a greater influence. A study performed on the Brazilian population found that racial inequality was only present for those who did not belong to the high-class status. This means race affects an individual's chances of upward mobility if they do not start in the upper class. Another theory concerning race and mobility is that, over time, racial inequality will be replaced by class inequality. However, other research has found that minorities, particularly African Americans, are still being policed and observed more at their jobs than their white counterparts. The constant policing has often led to the frequent firing of African Americans. In this case, African Americans experience racial inequality that stunts their upward social mobility.

== Psychological and social effects ==
=== Social class identity and belonging ===
Upward social mobility can result in changes in the personal values that define people's identity, existing relationships, and the social environment to which they belong. Social class identity is the connection someone has to their position in the socioeconomic system and how it affects the way they perceive themselves. It arises not only from objective factors, such as income levels, but also from experiences associated with their social class. A large part of one's sense of identity comes from the communities to which they belong. This background helps shape someone's identity, including things such as language, habits, and cultural practices. After experiencing upward social mobility, some people are caught between the identity developed in their class of origin and their new position. There is often a tension between a person's long-established tendencies and norms of their new social class. Differences between the class a person originated from and the one they are currently in could create conflicting feelings about their identity.

Being between these two class identities, people may feel as if they do not belong to either. As they become part of the higher class, they may face unfamiliar social rules and new ways of communicating. This can lead to feelings of being out of place. As they adjust to these new expectations, they may also become less recognizable to the communities in which they grew up.

=== Interpersonal relationships ===
Family dynamics can change as people experience upward social mobility, which changes their educational and financial standing. This can cause tension, as the values and obligations that someone once shared with their family change. Changing habits, such as communication styles and cultural preferences, can cause misunderstandings.

Similarly, upward social mobility can affect someone's relationships with friends and community. As people shift to a new position in society, they are exposed to new social circles and have less time for longtime friends and their previous community. This not only creates distance but also strains relationships. Some people have reported being unable to fully connect with their previous social circle because of their new experiences, especially when it becomes apparent how much their values and cultural practices now differ.

=== Guilt and emotional conflict ===
Upward social mobility can invoke feelings of guilt, as upwardly mobile people feel like they are "betraying" their families and community by leaving them behind to advance up the social ladder. They often feel obligated to stay loyal to their socioeconomic background, especially when they see others still struggling financially, without the same opportunities they were given. This guilt can still persist even when the individual maintains all their relationships, especially when it makes the difference more apparent. These complicated feelings are what make handling the emotional aspect of upward social mobility difficult.

One particular form of this guilt has been called family achievement guilt, typically seen in students who are first-generation and low-income. Research found that these students felt guilty knowing that their educational achievements and the career opportunities that followed were something their families could not have. This guilt included four dimensions: leaving family behind, having greater advantages, experiencing a disconnect with family, and possible financial burdens on family.

=== Psychological well-being ===
Research analyzing the relationship between upward social mobility and psychological well-being has shown both positive and negative outcomes. With higher socioeconomic status, people have access to better healthcare and living conditions, which can improve mental well-being. However, upward social mobility involves stressors such as adjusting to a new social environment and reconciling one's previous and current class. In one review, researchers found that people who experienced upward social mobility had better mental outcomes than those in lower classes, but worse than those who had been advantaged from the beginning.

== Patterns of mobility ==
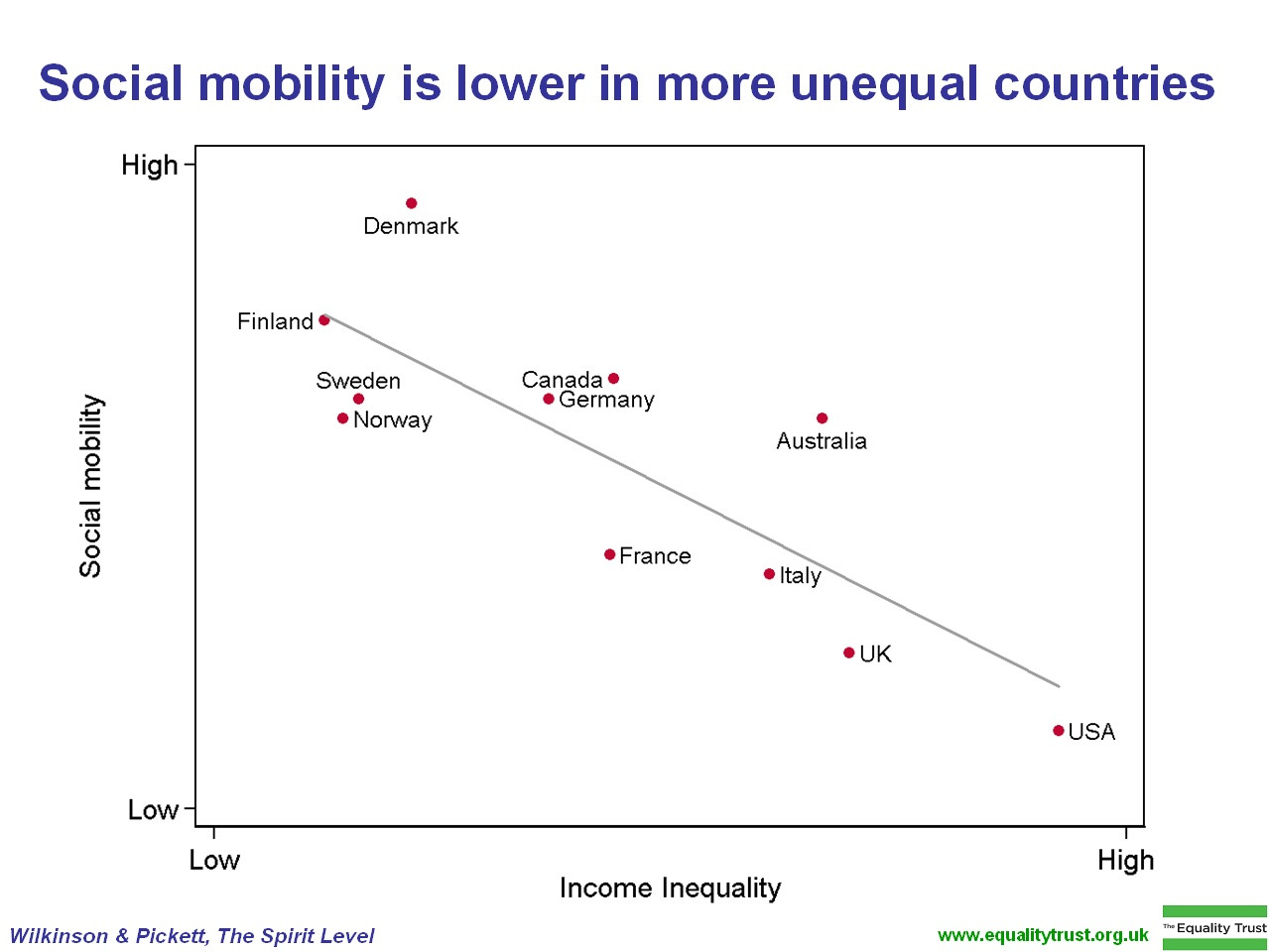
Social mobility is lower in more unequal countries, 2009.

While it is generally accepted that some level of mobility in society is desirable, there is no consensus agreement on how much social mobility is good for or bad for a society. There is no international benchmark of social mobility, though one can compare measures of mobility across regions or countries or within a given area over time.

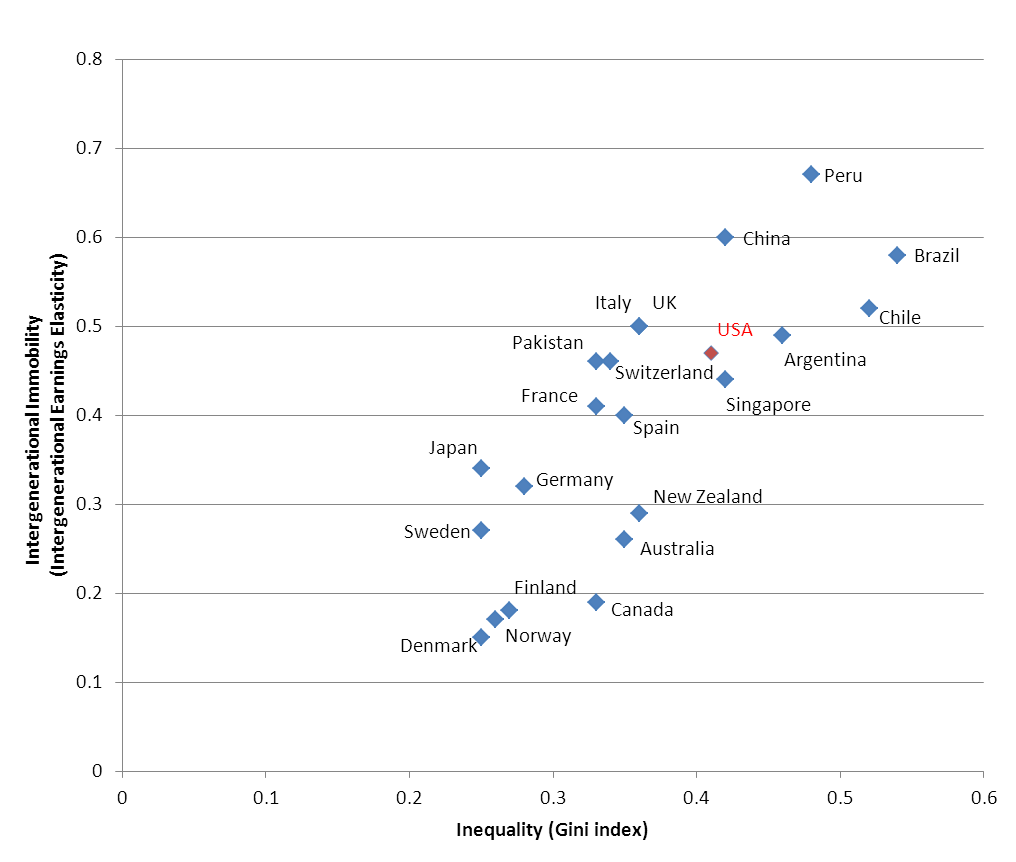
The Great Gatsby Curve, 2012. Higher equality of wealth correlates with higher social mobility for countries.

In a 2009 book, The Spirit Level: Why More Equal Societies Almost Always Do Better, epidemiologists Richard Wilkinson and Kate Pickett conducted an exhaustive analysis of social mobility in developed countries. In addition to other correlations with negative social outcomes for societies having high inequality, they found a relationship between high social inequality and low social mobility. Of the eight countries studied—Canada, Denmark, Finland, Sweden, Norway, Germany, the UK, and the US- the US had both the highest economic inequality and the lowest economic mobility. In this and other studies, the US had very low mobility at the lowest rungs of the socioeconomic ladder, with mobility increasing slightly as one goes up the ladder. At the top rung, mobility again decreases.

A 2006 study comparing social mobility across developed countries found that Denmark, Norway, Finland, and Canada had the highest social mobility, with less than 20% of the advantages of having a high-income parent passed on to their children.

Nations compared: The fraction of children from poor families growing up to be poor adults, 2006

A 2012 study found "a clear negative relationship" between income inequality and intergenerational mobility. Countries with low levels of inequality, such as Denmark, Norway, and Finland, had some of the greatest mobility, while the two countries with high levels of inequality—Chile and Brazil—had some of the lowest mobility.

In Britain, much debate on social mobility has been generated by comparisons of the 1958 National Child Development Study (NCDS) and the 1970 Birth Cohort Study BCS70, which compare intergenerational mobility in earnings between the 1958 and the 1970 UK cohorts, and claim that intergenerational mobility decreased substantially in this 12-year period. These findings have been controversial, partly due to conflicting findings on social class mobility using the same datasets, and partly due to questions regarding the analytical sample and the treatment of missing data. UK Prime Minister Gordon Brown has famously said that trends in social mobility "are not as we would have liked".

Along with the aforementioned "Do Poor Children Become Poor Adults?" study, The Economist also stated that "evidence from social scientists suggests that American society is much 'stickier' than most Americans assume. Some researchers claim that social mobility is actually declining." A 2006 German study corroborates these results.

In spite of this low social mobility, in 2008, Americans had the highest belief in meritocracy among middle- and high-income countries. A 2014 study of social mobility among the French corporate class found that social class influences who reaches the top in France, with those from the upper-middle classes tending to dominate, despite a longstanding emphasis on meritocracy.

In 2014, Thomas Piketty found that wealth-income ratios seem to be returning to very high levels in low economic growth countries, similar to what he calls the "classic patrimonial" wealth-based societies of the 19th century, where a minority lives off its wealth while the rest of the population works for subsistence living.

While measures of social mobility based on changes in income or wealth alone have differed dramatically by country and by the time period explored, a 2014 book by economist Gregory Clark, The Son Also Rises, provided a more complicated interpretation of the concept. Clark used surname groups to examine how social status persisted across generations over hundreds of years in Chile, China, England, India, Japan, Korea, Sweden, Taiwan, and the United States. Drawing on historical educational and professional records, Clark argued that long-term social mobility was slower and more limited across societies than conventional estimates suggested. In Sweden, he reported that titled-noble surnames appeared among lawyers and doctors at six times their frequency in the general population. The book also found that surnames associated with imperial-era Chinese elites remained overrepresented among contemporary high government officials and students at elite universities even in the People's Republic of China.

== See also ==
- Ascriptive inequality
- Asset poverty
- Cycle of poverty
- Desert (philosophy)
- Distribution of wealth
- Essential facilities doctrine
- Global Social Mobility Index
- Higher education bubble in the United States
- Individual mobility
- Kitchen sink realism
- Horizontal mobility
- Merit, excellence, and intelligence (MEI) – framework that emphasizes selecting candidates based solely on their merit, achievements, skills, abilities, intelligence and contributions
- Occupational prestige
- One-upmanship
- Rational expectations
- Social and Cultural Mobility
- Social policy
- Social stigma
- Socio-economic mobility in the United States
- Spatial inequality
- Winner and loser culture
