= Katherine Liberovskaya =

Canadian video artist

Katherine Liberovskaya (born 1961) is a Canadian video artist. Liberovskaya is known primarily for her experimental video works. She received her PhD from the Université du Québec à Montréal.

Her work is included in the collections of the National Gallery of Canada and Videographe, Montreal.
