= Barbad Golshiri =

Barbad Golshiri (born 1982 in Tehran, Iran) is an Iranian contemporary artist. He has worked both as a media artist and a critic. He works with video, digital media, installation, photography, the internet, graphic novels and Lettrism.

== Biography ==
His father was famed Iranian writer, Houshang Golshiri, and his mother is Farzaneh Taheri, a renowned literary translator. He studied painting at The School of Art and Architecture, Azad University, Tehran.

== Career ==
He won the third prize of the 6th Tehran Contemporary Painting Biennial, Tehran Museum of Contemporary Art. In the criticism symposium of the biennial, Golshiri's paper was praised as one of the three best articles.

Amiel Grumberg, the curator of "Too Much Pollution to Demonstrate: Soft Guerrillas in Tehran's Contemporary Art Scene - 2004" exhibition writes: Barbad Golshiri's series of videos, installations, and photography expresses a remarkable balance between foreign art influences and Iranian resonances".

What Has Befallen Us, Barbad? (video stills-2002)

After showing the work for the second time in New York, critics emphasized the exotic value of his work, finding arabesque motives in his locks of hair.

== See also ==
- Iranian modern and contemporary art
