= Marco Mazzi =

Italian multimedia artist

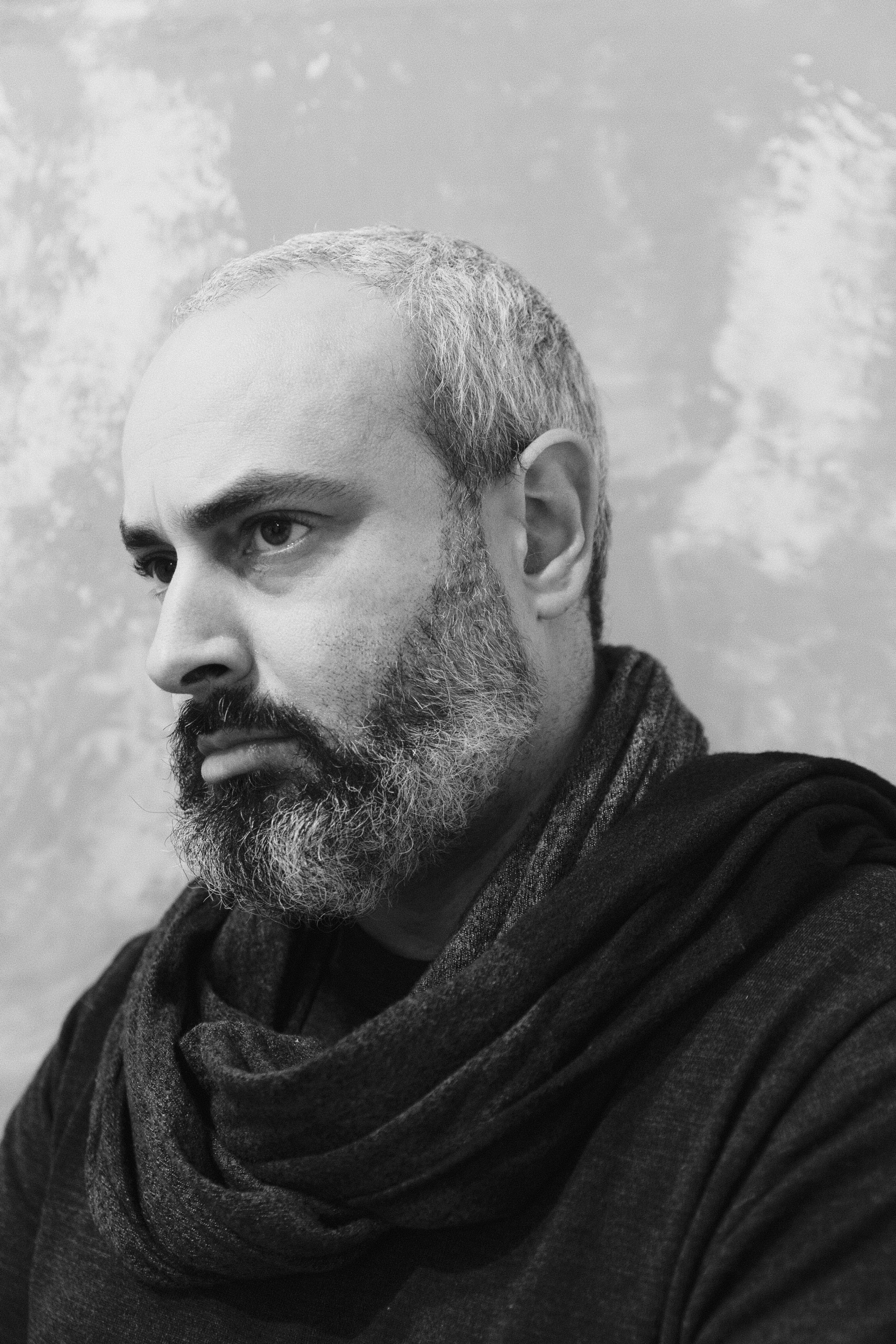
- Marco Mazzi in 2021
- Born: 5 May 1980 (age 46); Florence, Italy
- Education: University of Florence
- Known for: Contemporary Art, Photography
- Awards: Nomination for Best Director at the Prisma Film Awards in Rome (2024), Bangkok Society of Film Critics Award at the Bangkok Movie Awards (2024), First Prize as Best Analogue Film at The International Avant-Garde Movie Awards in New York (2024).

Marco Mazzi (born 5 May 1980) is an Italian multimedia artist, living and working in Tokyo, Florence, and Tirana. He worked as an editor in the publication of books of contemporary Japanese poetry, such as The Other Voice, the first Italian translation of Yoshimasu Gozo's poetry. Mazzi took part in the 44th New Jersey Film Festival in the section dedicated to experimental Super 8 cinema.

== Biography ==
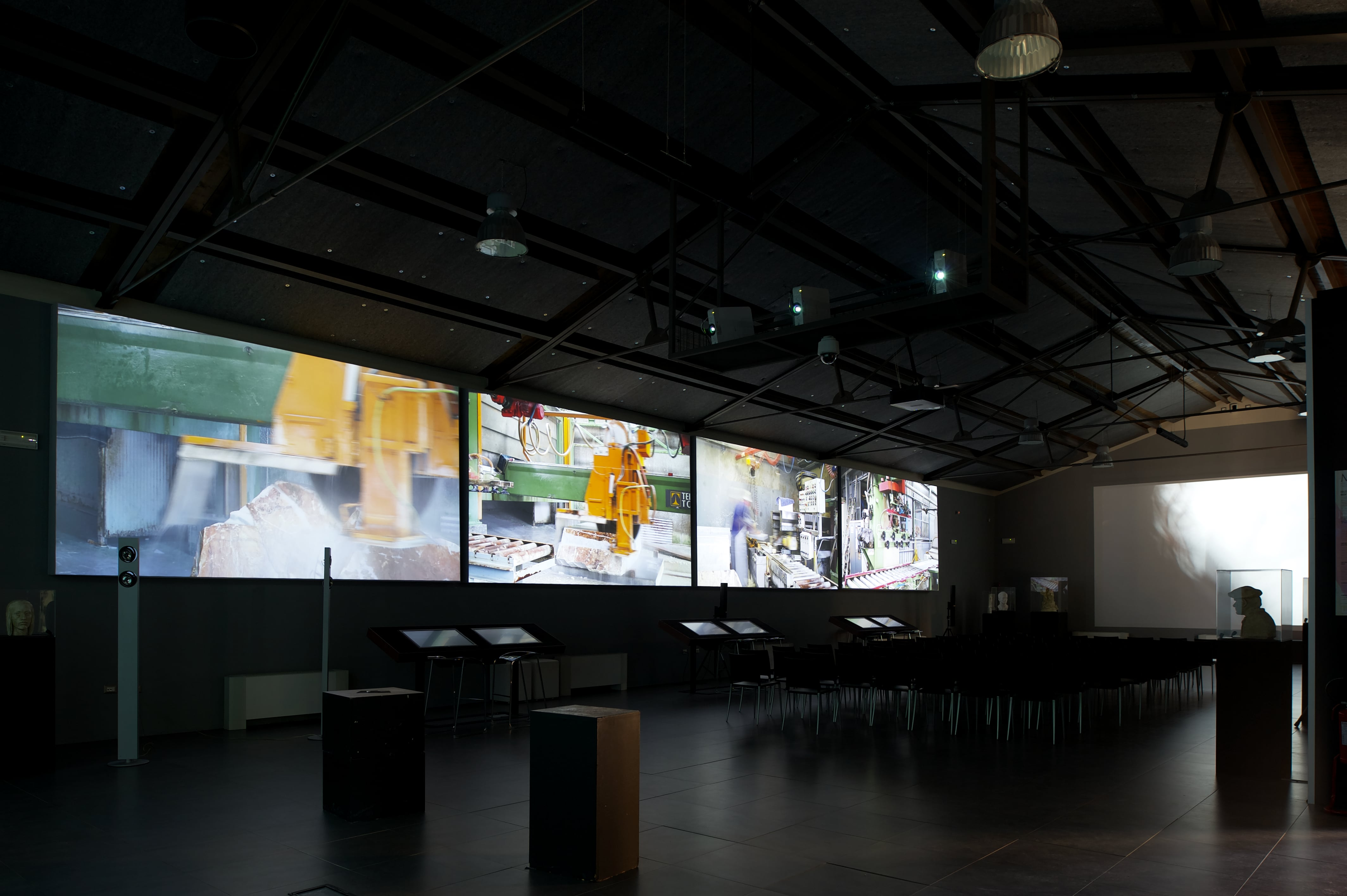
Mazzi's multi-channel video installation at MUSA, Pietrasanta.

Mazzi studied Contemporary literature at the University of Florence and visited Tokyo, where he studied Japanese avant-garde art and visual poetry. He held exhibitions at the 798 Art District in Beijing (China), the Komaba Art Museum of Tokyo (Japan), the Torino “Artissima” Art Fair (Italy), the Centro per l'arte contemporanea Luigi Pecci (Prato, Italy) and the Yokohama Museum of Art (Japan). In January 2008, The Watari Museum of Contemporary Art of Tokyo held the first solo exhibition of the artist in Japan, screening his single-channel video installation Voyager, a Journey through Time and Water (2005-2008). In October 2009 the Museo Laboratorio di Arte Contemporanea (MLAC, Rome) held Mazzi's exhibition "Seeing and Knowing, the Naturalization of Vision"Marco Mazzi - Seeing and Knowing: the naturalization of vision - Mlac - Museo Laboratorio di Arte Contemporanea - Dettaglio mostra, curated by the Italian writer and art critic Lorenzo Carlucci. In March 2010, he took part in the exhibition "Il medium disperso" (MLAC, Rome) together with Keren Cytter and Clemens von Wedemeyer. In 2008, Mazzi founded the non-profit organization "Relational Cinema Association" within the University of Waseda in Tokyo. The project involves screening of films and videos by Francesca Banchelli, Eric Baudelaire, Johanna Billing, Josef Dabernig, Gianluca and Massimiliano De Serio, Harun Farocki, Marine Hugonnier, Mark Lewis, Amie Siegel, Apichatpong Weerasethakul. Mazzi was photographer in residence at The Department of Eagles (Tirana, Albania), together with Diego Cossentino, during the conference “Pedagogies of Disaster, a Continent Conference”. In 2013 Mazzi collaborated with Jonas Staal for the project "The Venice Biennale Ideological Guide". Moreover, Mazzi was stage and still photographer for the leading Albanian artist Armando Lulaj during the making of the film "Recapitulation" (2015). The film was part of Armando Lulaj's installation "Albanian Trilogy", commissioned by the 2015 Venice Biennale's Albanian Pavilion.

== The Albanian Lapidar Survey ==
During the communist period, the Albanian regime erected a large number of so-called lapidars in virtually every village, town, and city in Albania. These concrete monoliths, on the one hand, functioned as monuments commemorating a variety of “heroes of the nation” and “partisans,” but on the other hand, also monumentalized the presence of the communist party in every part of the country. Their function as markers of social progress as well as commemoration is clearly shown in the 1984 Kinostudio documentary “Lapidari.” The ubiquity of these monumental structures and their relative opacity in the current cityscape – neither being demolished nor maintained, but having largely fallen into disrepair – reflect the common attitude regarding the undigested communist past of Albania. Vincent W.J. van Gerven Oei's 2014-2015 project "Albanian Lapidar Survey" involved archival research into the construction and topography of all lapidars in Albania and their historical context. The project intended to overcome a mere aesthetic appreciation of communist architecture but rather provide a thorough documentation of a unique mode of communist monumentality, making them as accessible as possible for future research through an online database and open access publication. Mazzi was photographer in residence for the "Albanian Lapidar Survey" project and photographed over six hundred communist monuments and architectural sites all over Albania.

== Filmmaking ==
In 2010, Mazzi shot a documentary film Kiju Yoshida and a Vision of Fear, in collaboration with Kiju Yoshida, the acclaimed Japanese film director. Mazzi directed several experimental documentary features and single-channel video installations, such as "Records of Experience" (2011), "Tokyo Elegy" (2012), and "Hypothesis for an Ideological Journey" (2012-2020, featuring Harun Farocki).

In 2018, the Luigi Pecci Centre for Contemporary Art of Prato (Italy) screened the video by Marco Mazzi, "Ricognizione (Aprile)".

In 2025, Marco Mazzi produced and directed the video documentary Omaggio a John Cage by Sergio Maltagliati, documenting a performance presented at the XV Florence Biennale. The complete documentation, including the video and related materials, is archived on Zenodo.

== Analytical and Conceptual Painting ==
Since 2020, the year of Marco Mazzi's first residency at the Viafarini program in Milan, the artist has embarked on a personal exploration of analytical painting. Mazzi works on medium-sized canvases, alternating between monochrome and vibrant colours. The theme of Mazzi's paintings is the same as that of his films: landscape and the relationship between image and sound. Although Mazzi held only one solo painting exhibition at the Cartavetra gallery in Florence in 2021, pictorial research is the foundation of the artist's visual poetics.

== Awards ==
Marco Mazzi has received numerous national and international awards, including the Nomination for Best Director at the Prisma Film Awards in Rome (2024)August 2024 Nominees, the Bangkok Society of Film Critics Award at the Bangkok Movie Awards (2024)September 2024 Monthly Competition Result | BMA and the First Prize in the Best Analogue Film category at the International Avant-Garde Movie Awards in New York (2024). Marco Mazzi was the artist invited to inaugurate the Liberi (Tutti) Festival in Verona in 2022. On that occasion, he presented a sound performance based on the percussion of two kettles found by chance on the street.
