= Linda K. George =

American sociologist and gerontologist

- Born: Linda Kaufman George; 1947 (age 78–79); Wadsworth, Ohio
- Education: Miami University; Duke University
- Scientific career
- Fields: Gerontology; Sociology
- Institutions: Duke University
- Thesis: Subjective Awareness of Self and Age in Middle and Late Life (1975)
- Academic advisors: Robert C. Atchley; Matilda White Riley

Linda Kaufman George (born 1947) is an American sociologist and gerontologist who is the Arts and Sciences Distinguished Professor of Sociology at Duke University. Her research focuses on the sociology of mental health, physical health, and aging, among other topics. She was president of the Gerontological Society of America from November 1993 to October 1994, and she received the Leonard I. Pearlin Award for Distinguished Contributions to the Sociological Study of Mental Health from the American Sociological Association in 2013.
