= Artwashing =

Use of art in gentrification

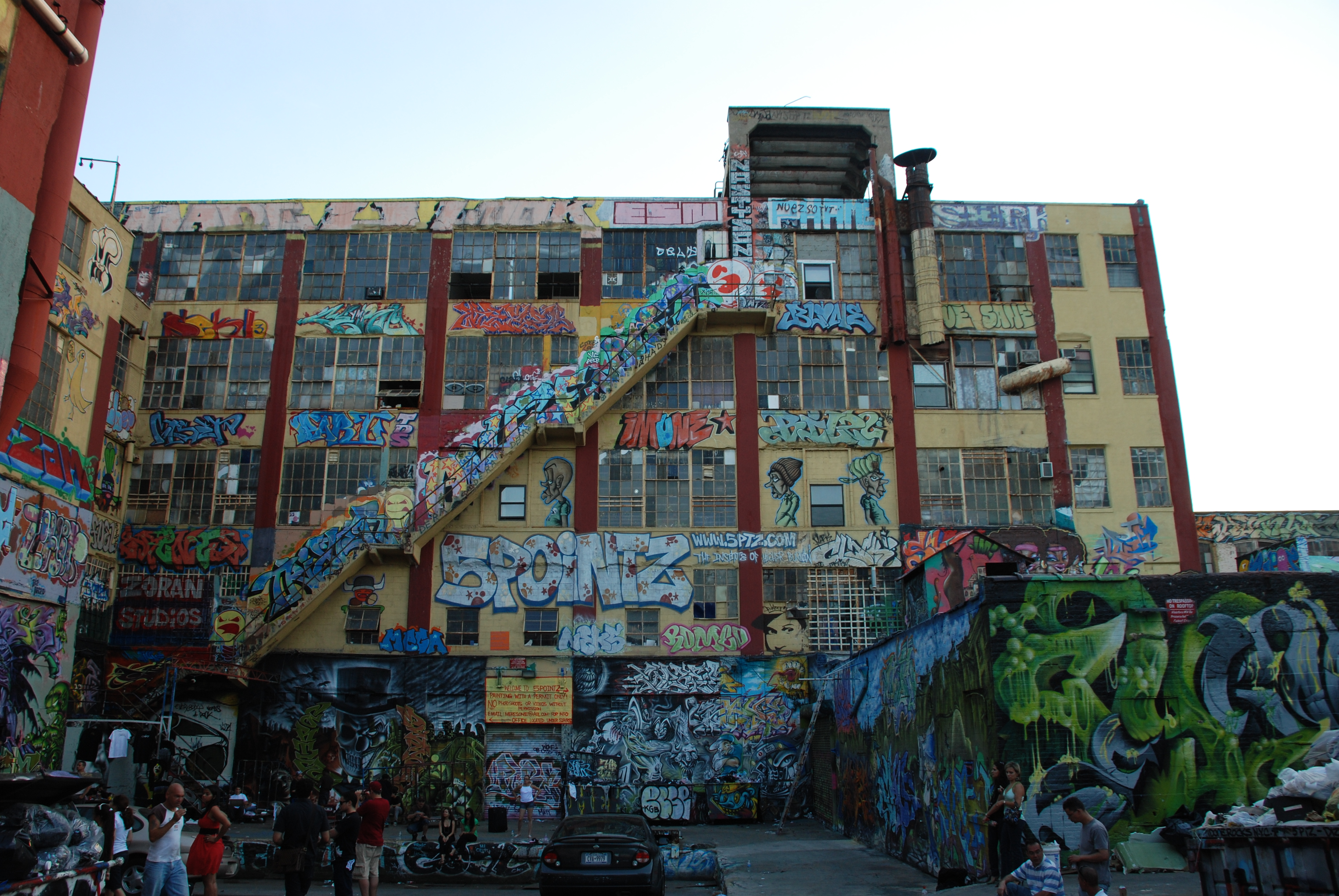
5 Pointz, a former graffiti-covered industrial building in Long Island City, New York, later demolished during a redevelopment project. The site became emblematic of tensions between street art, urban development, and gentrification.

Artwashing is a term used to describe the use of artistic and creative practices in ways that have been associated with processes of gentrification. In academic literature, the term has been used to refer to situations in which art is employed to make locations more amenable to private capital and to the aesthetics favored by higher-income groups.

The term is also widely used by activists, who argue that by promoting narratives of "creativity" and "coolness," artistic activity can function as a form of symbolic capital that contributes to the rebranding of devalued or industrial neighborhoods, a process they associate with the displacement of existing low-income communities.

In urban planning and development, artwashing is often described as taking the form of corporate sponsorship of temporary artworks or the creation of cultural "hubs", which are used to rebrand specific sites during periods of redevelopment. Critics argue that while such initiatives may create a sense of community engagement, they frequently align with broader redevelopment strategies that do not address underlying social inequalities and may reproduce existing power imbalances rather than produce inclusive forms of neighborhood change.

== Etymology and relation to other "washing" concepts ==
The term "artwashing" gained prominence in the mid-2010s and was popularized by activists and journalists, most notably Feargus O’Sullivan, during anti-gentrification protests in the Boyle Heights district of Los Angeles.

Etymologically, the term is a portmanteau of the words "art" and "whitewashing״. Artwashing has been discussed alongside other forms of “washing," such as greenwashing, pinkwashing, and sportswashing, which are often described as practices aimed at shaping public perception and legitimacy.

== Academic and theoretical context ==
The conceptual roots of artwashing predate the term itself and have been linked to earlier theories on the relationship between culture and urban development, including the "artistic mode of production" theorized by Sharon Zukin in the early 1980s. This framework examines how cultural activity has been incorporated into real estate development and investment strategies within the built environment.

Similarly, geographer David Ley analyzed the role of artists in processes of gentrification, describing them as early or "pioneer" actors whose presence can contribute to the revaluation of previously disinvested or industrial urban areas, thereby attracting subsequent middle-class and professional investment.

=== Typology of art-led urban regeneration ===
A typology of art-led urban regeneration has been proposed, distinguishing between three models based on their underlying motivations and outcomes:

- Parasitic: A top-down model in which capital-rich developers appropriate and monetize a community's existing cultural assets, a process associated with commodification and displacement.
- Paternalistic: An approach characterized by externally driven interventions that offer limited or "cosmetic" responses to structural social problems without substantially altering local power relations.
- Empowering: A horizontal, community-led model oriented toward self-determination, local control, and the expansion of civic participation.

Building on related critical urban scholarship, Stephen Pritchard (2017) identified several forms through which artwashing may operate in practice, including corporate artwashing (the use of art for reputational management), developer-led artwashing (employing art to market high-end real estate), local authority-led artwashing (cultural initiatives used to rebrand areas targeted for redevelopment), artist-led artwashing, and community-based artwashing, where artistic participation functions primarily as a form of symbolic consultation.

== Artwashing in urban development and planning ==
In the late 1990s and early 2000s, UK policy discourse under the New Labour government promoted an "Urban renaissance" agenda that positioned arts and culture as tools for addressing urban decline and social exclusion. Researchers have since noted that while these policies emphasized cultural investment, they often relied on high-profile "flagship" projects and offered limited evidence of sustained social benefits, particularly in relation to affordable housing and long-term inclusion.

=== Temporary and tactical urbanism ===
In more recent urban development contexts, artwashing has been discussed in relation to practices commonly described as "temporary" or "tactical" urbanism. These approaches involve short-term, flexible, or interim uses of urban space, often deployed during periods of redevelopment. In this context, developers and other actors may sponsor rotating street artworks, cultural installations, or short-term events in "interim" spaces as a way of activating sites prior to their final use. Such practices have been analyzed as forms of cultural signaling that reframe redevelopment areas as "creative" or "vibrant", even while longer-term plans remain focused on commercial or high-end residential development. Scholars have also examined the role of digital platforms in these processes, noting how the circulation of curated images of temporary artworks and urban aesthetics can contribute to shaping public perceptions of redevelopment projects. This form of "digital placemaking" has been discussed as influencing which representations of the city become publicly visible and associated with particular sites.

== Case studies ==
The concept of artwashing has been examined across a range of urban contexts, with scholars, journalists, and activists applying the term to different forms of cultural intervention and redevelopment. The following case studies, drawn from academic research and public debate, illustrate how artwashing has been discussed in diverse geographical, institutional, and social settings.

These examples are not intended to provide an exhaustive account of the phenomenon, but rather to highlight recurring themes and variations in how artistic practices intersect with processes of urban redevelopment, public perception, and displacement.

=== Boyle Heights, LA, USA ===
In the Boyle Heights neighborhood of Los Angeles, activists formed coalitions such as Boyle Heights Against Artwashing and Displacement (BHAAAD) in response to the opening of commercial art galleries on the area's industrial outskirts. Protesters argued that these galleries contributed to processes of gentrification by attracting outside investment and visitors, and that they served interests external to the predominantly working-class Chicanx community. Demonstrations focused on what became known as "gallery row," with activists framing the presence of galleries as a factor in broader patterns of displacement and neighborhood change.

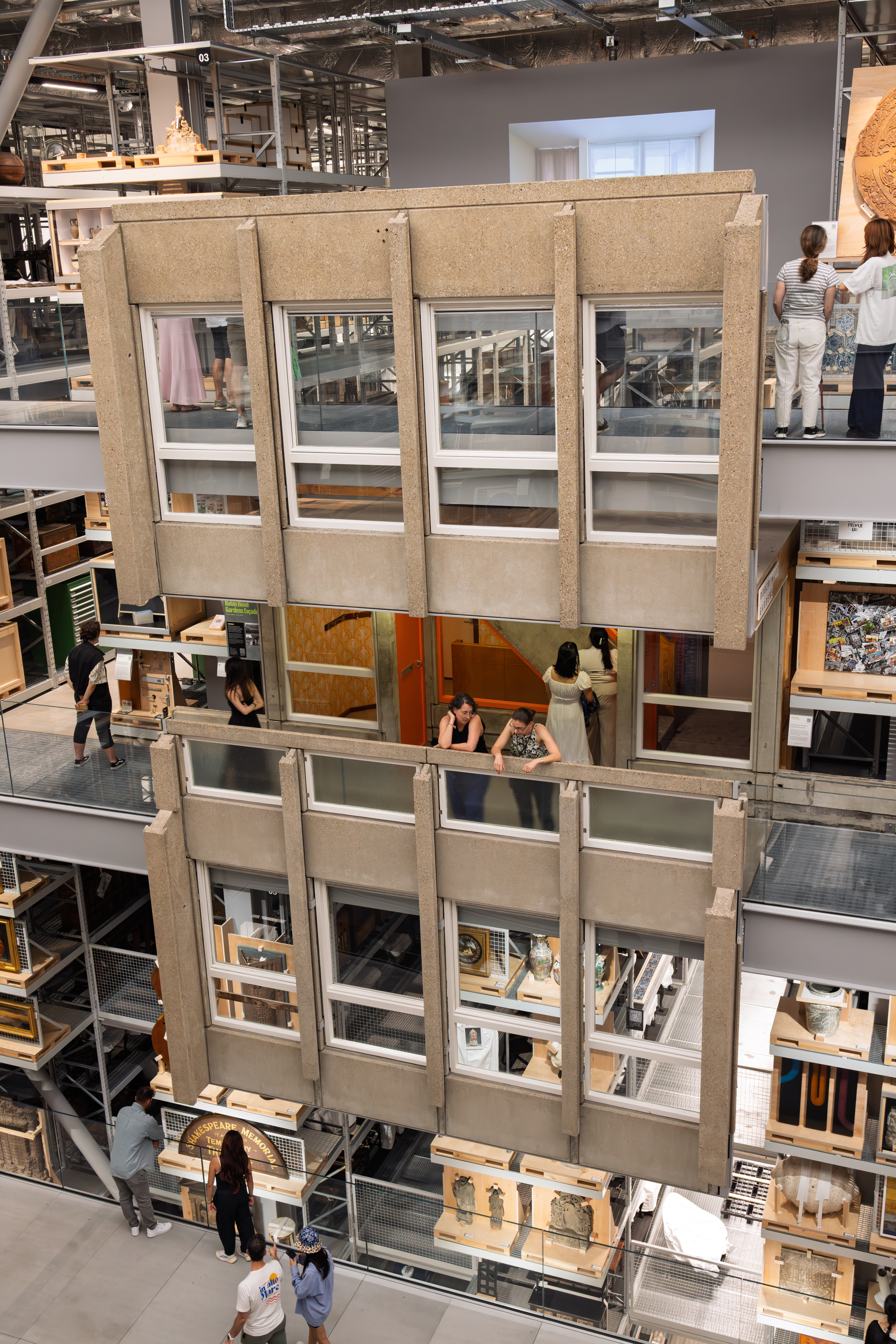
The facade of Robin Hood Gardens residential estate displayed in the V&A East Storehouse museum

=== London, UK ===
In London, the Victoria and Albert Museum (V&A) faced criticism after acquiring a three-story fragment of the former Robin Hood Gardens council estate for display as architectural "salvage" at the Venice Architecture Biennale. Critics argued that this act of preservation abstracted the estate from its social context and obscured the displacement of former residents following its demolition. This case is cited in public debate as an example of state- or institution-led artwashing, in which cultural framing was seen as distancing redevelopment processes from their social consequences.

=== Salt River, Cape Town, South Africa ===
In the historic working-class neighborhood of Salt River in Cape Town, the International Public Arts Festival (IPAF) introduced more than 200 murals as part of a large-scale public art initiative. While festival organizers stated that the project aimed to promote community pride and cultural visibility, some residents criticized the artworks for their perceived lack of connection to local culture and neighborhood history. In response, certain residents altered or replaced murals they viewed as externally imposed, with imagery reflecting local values and political concerns. An aesthetic audit of the area indicated that murals were disproportionately concentrated on properties rated as "average" or "derelict," leading researchers to question the relationship between public art placement and subsequent processes of neighborhood revaluation and gentrification.

=== Berlin, Germany ===
In Berlin, real estate developer Covivio commissioned the A-Fence street art project around a construction site at Alexanderplatz. The initiative involved large-scale murals displayed on fencing surrounding the redevelopment area. Critics described the project as a public relations strategy intended to reframe perceptions of the development amid ongoing public debate about housing shortages in the city. The artworks were widely circulated through social media, where they contributed to presenting the developer as culturally engaged, despite concerns raised regarding the project's broader social and infrastructural impacts.

== Criticism and debates ==
The concept of artwashing has generated ongoing debate among critics, journalists, scholars, and community groups, particularly regarding the role of art and culture in processes of urban change.

=== Arguments for the civilizing role of art ===
Some commentators have challenged the critical framing of artwashing by emphasizing the positive social and cultural functions of art in cities. Writing in The Guardian, art critic Jonathan Jones argued that cultural institutions and artistic activity contribute to vibrant and diverse Urban Life, and that galleries and cultural venues often enhance the social appeal of neighborhoods. He maintained that the idea of art revitalizing Urban areas is more plausible than interpretations that frame cultural activity primarily as a mechanism for masking inequality, characterizing attacks on artistic and creative forces as counterproductive.

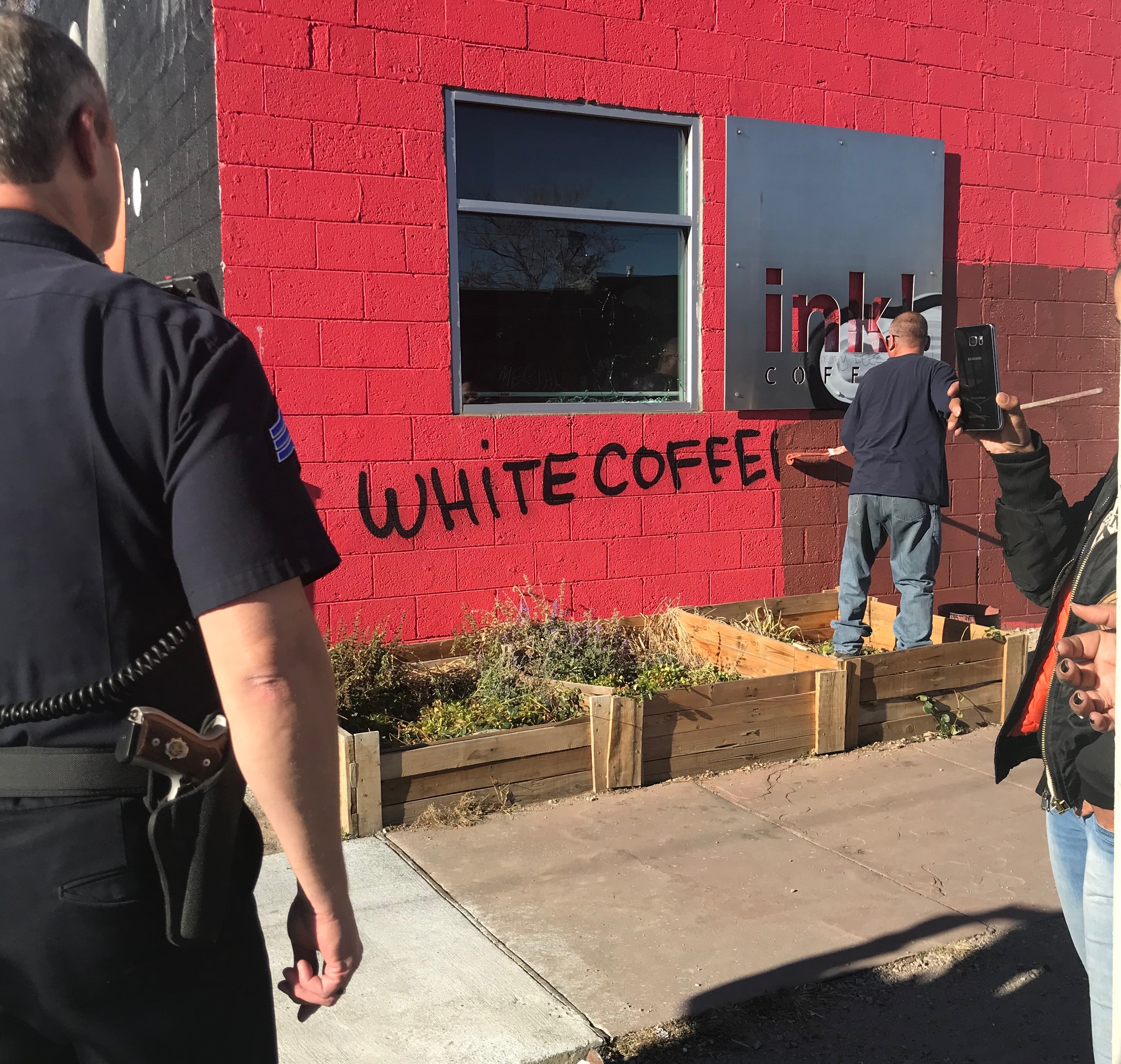
City of Denver cleanup at an Ink! Coffee shop in Five Points after vandalism linked to an advertising campaign perceived as related to gentrification.

=== Misdirected blame and "coffeewashing" ===
Other critics have questioned whether art is an appropriate focal point for critiques of gentrification. In the Financial Times, Jan Dalley argued that attributing displacement to artistic activity diverts attention from structural factors, particularly the absence of effective housing policies aimed at maintaining affordable housing. She suggested that if the arrival of new commercial activity is taken as an indicator of displacement, the term "coffeewashing" may be more descriptive, noting that cafes and restaurants often generate greater economic returns than art galleries. Dalley further argued that the term "artwashing" is more accurately applied in contexts where states or institutions use cultural engagement to improve their image while continuing to restrict or penalize artistic expression.

=== Resident resistance and contested public space ===
In some urban contexts, residents have resisted forms of public art. They argued that such interventions can turn lived spaces into sites of display oriented toward outside audiences, positioning residents as unwilling participants in cultural spectacle. These concerns have been linked to efforts by local communities to reclaim public surfaces for representations that reflect their own histories, values, and identities.

== See also ==
- -washing
