= Leonard Pearlin =

American sociologist (1924–2014)

- Born: December 26, 1924; Quincy, Massachusetts
- Died: July 23, 2014 (aged 89)
- Education: Oklahoma University; Columbia University
- Known for: Sociology of mental illness
- Spouse: Gerrie Pearlin
- Children: Susan; Gina
- Awards: Leo G. Reeder Award from the Section on Medical Sociology from the American Sociological Association (1991)
- Scientific career
- Fields: Sociology
- Institutions: National Institute of Mental Health; University of California-San Francisco; University of Maryland
- Thesis: The social and psychological setting of communications behavior: an analysis of television viewing (1956)
- Doctoral advisor: Herbert Hyman

Leonard Irving Pearlin (December 26, 1924 – July 23, 2014) was an American sociologist whose work focused on the sociology of mental illness. Much of this work centered around the "stress process model", a model he developed to attempt to explain the relationship between stress and mental health. He earned his Ph.D. from Columbia University in 1956. He worked at the National Institute of Mental Health (NIMH) for over two decades, where he worked with such researchers as Melvin L. Kohn and Carmi Schooler to study the sociology of mental health. In 1982, he left the NIMH to join the University of California, San Francisco (UCSF) as professor in the Human Development and Aging Program, of which he served as director from 1982 to 1984. He was also the editor-in-chief of the Journal of Health and Social Behavior from 1982 to 1984. In 1994, he retired from UCSF to join the University of Maryland as a graduate professor and senior research scientist; he remained a professor there until his retirement in 2007. In 2000, he and his wife, Gerrie, established the Leonard I. Pearlin Award for Distinguished Contributions to the Sociological Study of Mental Health, which is given by the Section on the Sociology of Mental Health of the American Sociological Association.
