= Osamu Kanemura =

Japanese photographer (born 1964)

Osamu Kanemura (金村 修, Kanemura Osamu; born March 29, 1964) is a Japanese photographer.
