= Pleurad Xhafa =

Albanian artist and filmmaker (born 1984)

- Born: 1984 (age 41–42); Lushnjë
- Education: Accademia di Belle Arti di Bologna
- Known for: Artistic critiques of Neoliberalism, activism

Pleurad Xhafa (born in 1984 in Lushnjë) is an Albanian artist, documentary filmmaker, and activist currently based in Tirana. Xhafa develops projects that examine the effects produced by neoliberal political experiments. His research and work focus on contemporary culture, visually and politically, through a post-conceptual practice. Xhafa is one of the founders of the reorganization of DebatikCenter of Contemporary Art and is a member of the art collective Manifesto.

== Life and work ==
In 1997, Xhafa witnessed the collapse of pyramid schemes, an event that led to violent civil unrest which started in Lushnjë. Following that, during Albania's early stage of shock therapy in 1998, he moved to Tirana to study at Jordan Misja Artistic Lyceum. Subsequently, in 2002, he left to study in Italy at the Accademia di Belle Arti di Bologna, where he graduated with a Master of Fine Arts.

In 2009 he created the work Déjà-vu & Paranoia together with his colleague Sokol Peçi while returning from Italy to Albania. It depicted a clay head of the Nobel Prize-winning economist Milton Friedman. He created it during a train journey from Bologna to Bari.

=== Çeta ===
Xhafa was part of the art collective Çeta (2016– 2017). During its existence, Çeta produced several politically motivated works addressing public-private partnerships in Albania, social injustice, and the still unsolved death of child labour victim Ardit Gjoklaj.

== Activism ==
Xhafa was one of the artists who openly protested against the Albanian government's decision to demolish the National Theatre of Albania, occupying the theater for two consecutive years. On May 17, 2020, the last night of the COVID-19 pandemic quarantine, Xhafa was arrested inside the theater. During a confrontation with the police, Xhafa received a severe injury to his right leg. Xhafa was accused of resisting the police, illegal gathering, and breaking the quarantine. After forensic examination, the police dropped two charges, enforcing only one fine for breaking quarantine.

== Awards ==
- Ardhje Award, 2014
