= Photography in Albania =

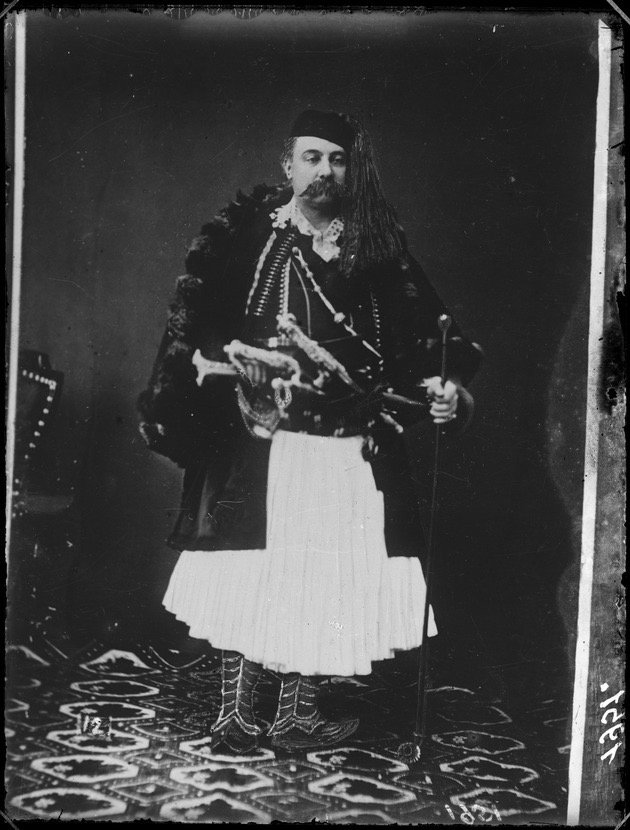
This image of Italian consul Alessandro De Rege di Donato, who served in Shkodër from February 20, 1881 to February 18, 1886 is one of the earliest preserved photographs in Albania (c. Pietro Marubi).

The history of photography in Albania begins with the Marubi Dynasty and its founder Pietro Marubi (1834–1903), who settled in the northwestern city of Shkodër from Piacenza, Italy during the second half of the nineteenth century and opened the first photography studio there in 1858. Having no children of his own, Marubi's first assistants and faithful successors were Mati and Kel Kodheli, the sons of his gardener Rrok Kodheli. Pietro sent Mati, the elder of the two brothers, to study photography at the Sebastianutti & Benque studio in Trieste. When Mati died prematurely at age nineteen, in 1881, Pietro adopted Kel, whom he also sent to Italy to study and who would later assume the surname Marubi. Upon Pietro's death in 1903, Kel inherited his adopted father's studio and continued its work. He, in turn, was followed into business by his own son, Geg Marubi, who studied photography and cinematography in France at the Lumière brothers’ studio.

With the onset of Communist rule in the 1940s, when every private enterprise was prohibited by law, Geg Marubi was forced to turn over his family’s archive to the state. Other photo studios that had opened in Albania over the course of the same decades, including Dritëshkroja e Kolës (1886), Fotografija Pici (1924), Foto Jakova (1932), and Foto Rraboshta (1943), also had to relinquish their images. From these combined sources, the Marubi Photothèque was founded as a division of the Historical Museum of Shkodër. It remained a part of this museum until 2003, when it became an autonomous institution.

Its successor, the National Museum of Photography "Marubi" and Albania’s first photography museum, opened on May 9, 2016. The core of its collection consists of what was formerly the contents of the Marubi Photothèque.

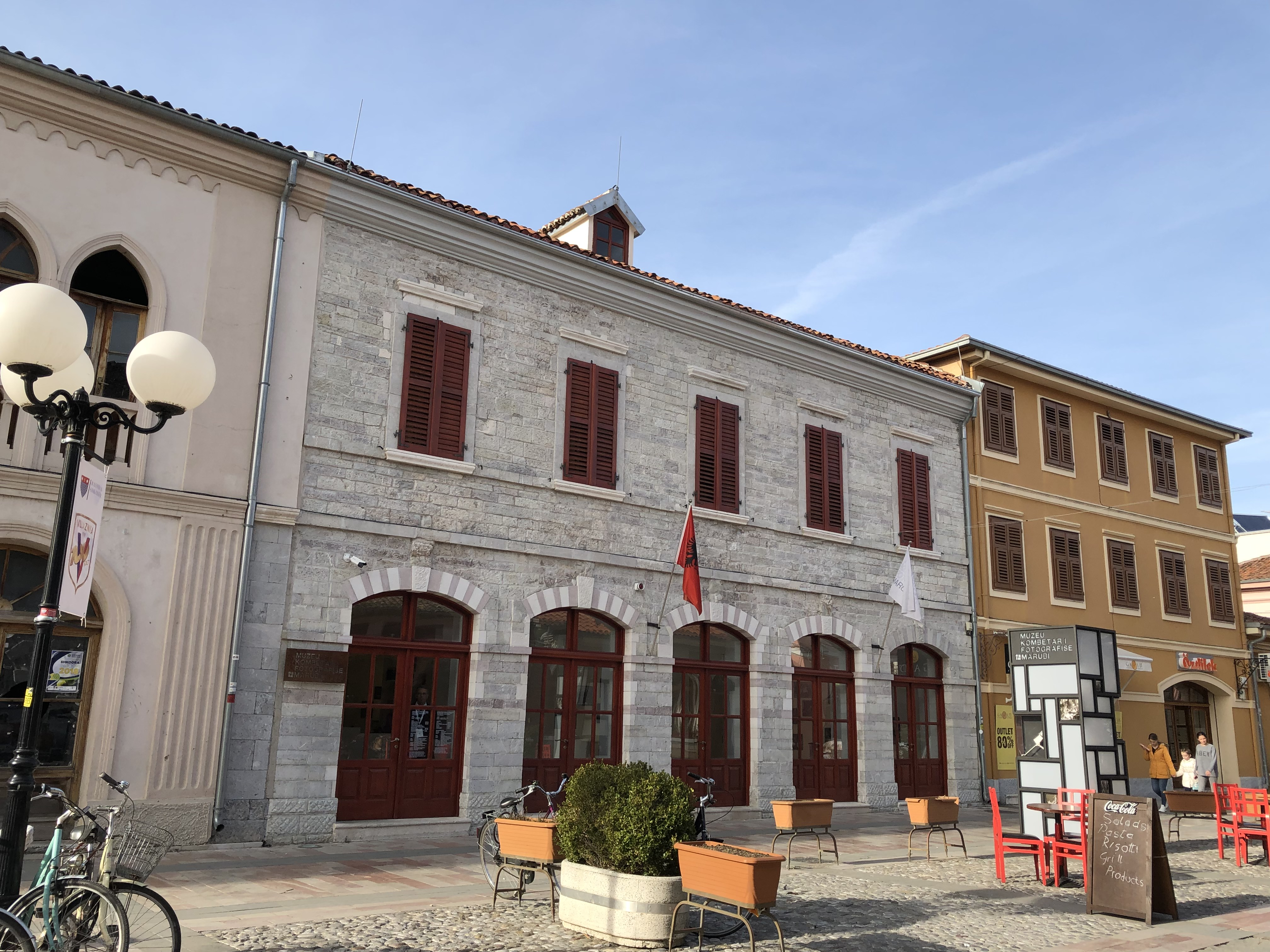
Marubi Museum hosts a vast collection of more than 500,000 photographs dating back to 1856.

The Marubi museum preserves and promotes a collection of more than 500,000 negatives dating from the second half of the nineteenth century to the end of the twentieth century. The Marubi family archive, along with archives of many other photographers in the museum’s holdings document pivotal moments in Albanian social, cultural, and political life over the course of a century and a half.

The pre-war period is often regarded as the "golden age" of Albanian photography. Other well-known photographers of this time include Dhimitër Vangjeli, Vani Burda, Kristo Sulidhi, Pero Kaçauni, Kolë Maca, Kristaq Sotiri, Foti Papajani, Dedë Jakova, Ali Bakiu, Petro Dhimitri, Manaqi Brothers, Lilo Xhimitiku, Ymer Bali, Shan Pici, Pjetër Rraboshta and others.

== Post-war period ==
In Communist Albania, photography was commissioned by the state. The central institution responsible for producing and archiving images was the Albanian Telegraphic Agency which had a photographic laboratory as early as 1947. The first photojournalists of this era included Vasil Ristani and Mehmet Kallfa. In the late 1950s, pioneer homes, at least in Tirana, offered photography courses. During the 1960s, "Ylli" magazine, which at the time served as the showcase of Albanian photography, organized a photography competition every year that was open to both professionals and amateurs.

== See also ==
- List of Albanian photographers
