= Benque =

Benque may refer to:

- Benque Viejo del Carmen (or simply Benque), a town in Cayo District, Belize
- Benque Viejo, a town in Corozal District, Belize
- Benque, Haute-Garonne, a French commune
- Benqué, a former French commune
  - Benqué-Molère, a French commune
- Benque-Dessous-et-Dessus, French commune
- Franz Benque (1841–1921), German photographer
