= Marubi =

Marubi may refer to:

- Marubi National Museum of Photography
- Pietro Marubi
- Kel Marubi
