= Arab and Muslim rescue efforts during the Holocaust =

Jews sheltered by Arab and Muslim population

A number of Muslims participated in efforts to help save Jewish fleeing from the Holocaust. From June 1940 through May 1943, Axis powers, namely Nazi Germany and Italy, controlled large portions of North Africa. Approximately 1 percent of the Jewish residents, about 4,000 to 5,000 Jews, of that territory were murdered by these regimes during this period. The relatively low mortality of Jewish North Africans is largely due to the success of the Allied North African Campaign in liberating the region from Axis forces.

Offers by Vichy French officials to take over confiscated Jewish property in Algeria found many French settlers ready to profit from the scheme, but no Arab participated and, in the capital, Algiers, Muslim clerics openly declared their opposition to the idea.

Arab rescue efforts were not limited to the Middle East–Si Kaddour Benghabrit, the rector of the Great Mosque of Paris, according to different sources, helped anywhere from 100 to 500 Jews disguise themselves as Muslims. Instances of Albanian Muslims aiding Jews to escape from the Holocaust in Europe have also been documented. In September 2013, Yad Vashem declared an Egyptian doctor, Mohammed Helmy, one of the Righteous Among the Nations for saving the life of Anna Gutman (née Boros), putting himself at personal risk for three years, and for helping her mother Julie, her grandmother, Cecilie Rudnik, and her stepfather, Georg Wehr, to survive the holocaust. Helmy is the first Arab to have been so honoured.

== Tehran children ==
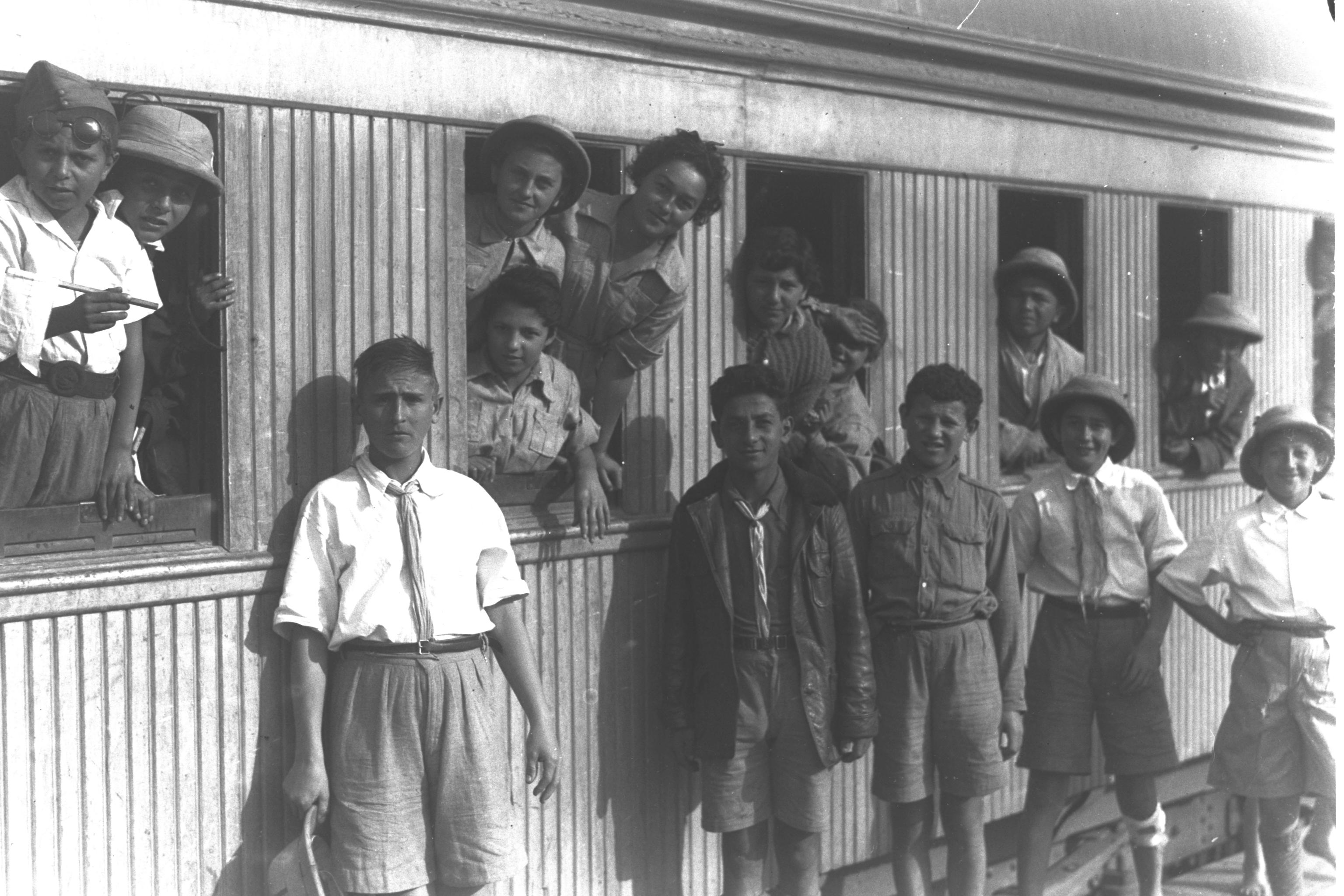
A group of "Teheran Children" in front of a railway carriage

Iran became the place of refuge for 116,000 Polish refugees, of whom, around 5,000 were Polish Jews. Iranians openly received them, supplying them with provisions. Young survivors who arrived in Iran became known as the 'Tehran Children'.

One of the refugees, Adam Szymel, recalling the moment he entered Iran, said:

Well, on the camp, there was on that ship there was just two of us. My mother stayed behind with my grandmother and two sisters. They left about two weeks later. We arrived in at that time was Persia, now it's Iran. Port of Pahlavi ... Finally, we were free. We could really say we were free... It's like when the weight is dropped off your shoulders. That you could speak freely without, you know, looking if someone is watching you. That you're your own master, you're free. I was 14 years old.

== In North Africa ==
=== Si Ali Sakkat ===
During his career, Si Ali Sakkat held positions of a government minister and mayor of Tunis. By 1940, Si Ali Sakkat was enjoying retirement on his farm at the base of Jebel Zaghouan. There was a forced labor camp for the Jews not far away from Sakkat's farm. Jews from the camp were put to work repairing an airfield, which was regularly bombed by Allies. Arabs saw how Germans who ran the camp beat Jews on a regular basis. One night, during an especially heavy battle, sixty Jewish laborers were able to escape. The first structure they encountered was the wall of Sakkat's farm. They knocked on the gate, and were allowed shelter and food. They were also allowed to stay until the liberation of Tunisia by Allied forces.

=== Khaled Abdul-Wahab ===
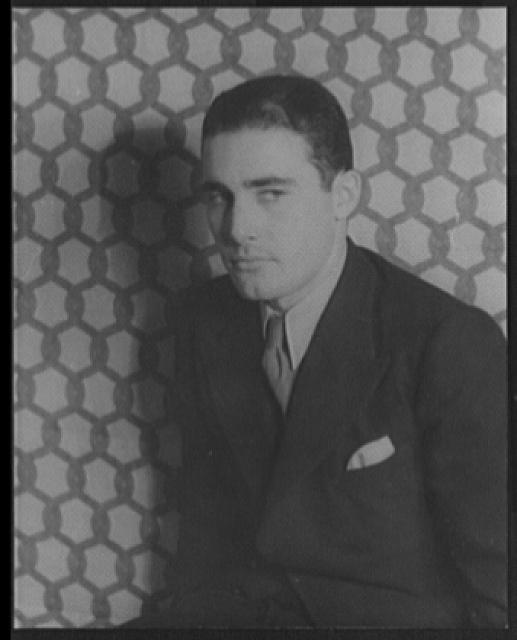
Portrait of Khaled Abdul Wahab

Abdul-Wahab was a son of a well-known Tunisian historian. He was 32 years old when the Germans occupied Tunisia. He was an interlocutor between the Nazis and the population of the coastal town of Mahdia. When he overheard German officers planning to rape a local Jewish woman, Odette Boukhris, he hid the woman and her family, along with about two dozen more Jewish families, at his farm outside of town. The families stayed there for four months, until the occupation ended. Abdul-Wahab is sometimes called the Arab Oskar Schindler. In 2009 two trees were dedicated to honor his bravery. One tree was planted in Adas Israel Garden of the Righteous in Washington, D.C., the other was planted in the Garden of the Righteous Worldwide. His daughter Faiza attended the ceremony in Milan.

=== Shaykh Taieb el-Okbi ===
Taieb el-Okbi was a member of Algerian Islah (Reform) Party, and a friend of the prominent Algerian reformist Abdelhamid Ben Badis, who was tolerant of different religions and cultures. Ben Badis founded and directed the Algerian League of Muslims and Jews. When he died before Vichy forces occupied Algeria, Taieb el-Okbi took his place. When he discovered that the leaders of the pro-Nazi group the Légion Français des Combattants were planning a Kristallnacht-style pogrom against Algerian Jews with the help of Muslim troops, he tried to prevent it, issuing a fatwa ordering Muslims not to attack Jews. His actions have been compared to Archbishops Jules-Géraud Saliège and Pierre-Marie Gerlier, whose efforts saved scores of Jews in Occupied France.

=== Moncef Bey ===
Tunisia was a de facto French colony under Moncef Bey during the War. The Nazis established labor camps in Tunisia, killing over 2,500 Tunisian Jews. Just eight days after ascending the throne, he awarded the highest royal distinction to about twenty prominent Tunisian Jews. Moncef later went on to say that Tunisian Jews are "his children" like Tunisian Muslims. His prime minister, Mohamed Chenik, regularly warned Jewish leaders of German plans. He helped Jews avoid arrest, intervened to prevent deportations, and even hid individual Jews. Because all legislation needed his signature, Moncef Bey stalled anti-semitic laws. According to Mathilda Guez, a Tunisian Jew who later became an Israeli politician, Moncef Bey gathered all the senior officials of the realm at the palace and gave them this warning:

The Jews are having a hard time but they are under our patronage and we are responsible for their lives. If I find out that an Arab informer caused even one hair of a Jew to fall, this Arab will pay with his life.

Moncef Bey was later ousted from power, with the French claiming that he was a Nazi collaborator. General Alphonse Juin doubted this charge and tried to prevent his ouster. The real reason he was removed was because he formed the first solely Tunisian government, causing an outcry by French settlers.

=== Mohammed V ===
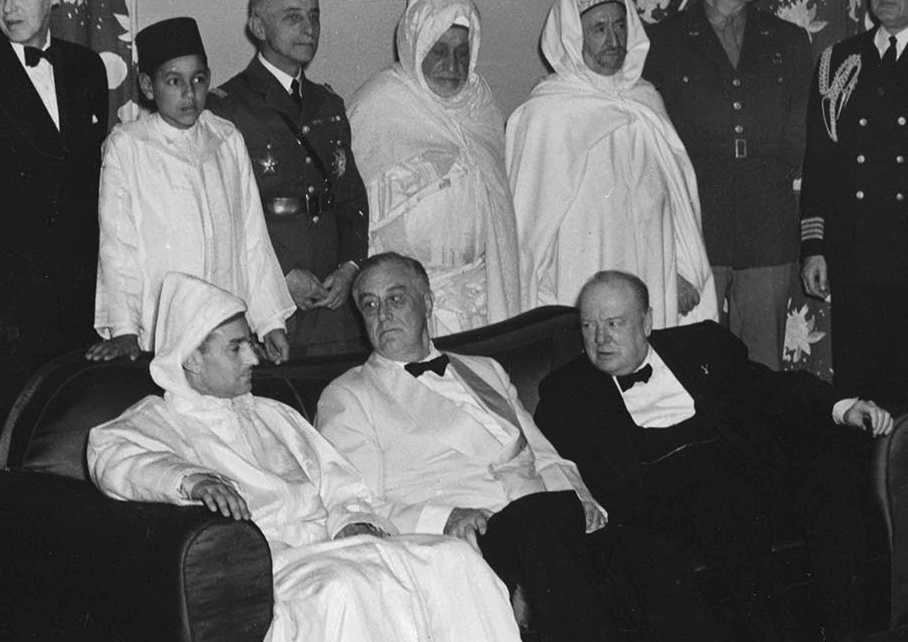
Mohammed V with FDR and Churchill

Mohammed V, king of Morocco during World War II, refused to sign laws by Vichy officials implement anti-Jewish legislation, such as the yellow badge, and deport the country's 250,000 Jews to their deaths in Nazi concentration and extermination camps in Europe. The sultan's stand was "based as much on the insult the Vichy diktats posed to his claim of sovereignty over all his subjects, including the Jews, as on his humanitarian instincts." Partial Nazi race measures were enacted in Morocco over Mohammed's objection, and Mohammed did sign, under the instructions of Vichy officials, two decrees that barred Jews from certain schools and positions.

Nevertheless, Mohammed is highly esteemed by Moroccan Jews who credit him for protecting their community during the Holocaust. Mohammed V has been honored by Jewish organizations for his role in protecting his Jewish subjects during the Holocaust. Some historians maintain that Mohammed's anti-Nazi role has been exaggerated; historian Michel Abitol writes that while Mohammed V was compelled by Vichy officials to sign the anti-Jewish laws, "he was more passive than Moncef Bay in that he did not take any side and did not engage in any public act that could be interpreted as a rejection of Vichy's policy."

== Muslim rescue efforts in Europe ==
Albania, a predominantly Muslim country, saved almost all of its resident Jewish population. The survival rate in the then-Yugoslavian province of Kosovo was 60%, making it one of the areas with the highest Jewish survival rate in Europe. In France, some Arabs participated in the resistance against Nazi persecution of Jews. Algerian religious leaders Si Kaddour Benghabrit and Abdelkader Mesli hid and saved Jews in the basements of the Grand Mosque of Paris. Mesli was later sent to Dachau and later Mauthausen. In Paris, a handwritten note written in Kabyle said:

Yesterday evening, the Jews of Paris were arrested – the elderly, women, and children. In exile like us, workers like us, these are our brothers. Their children are like our children. If you encounter one of their children, you must give him asylum and protection until the time that the misfortune – or the sorrow – passes. Oh, man of my country, your heart is generous.

=== Djaafar Khemdoudi ===
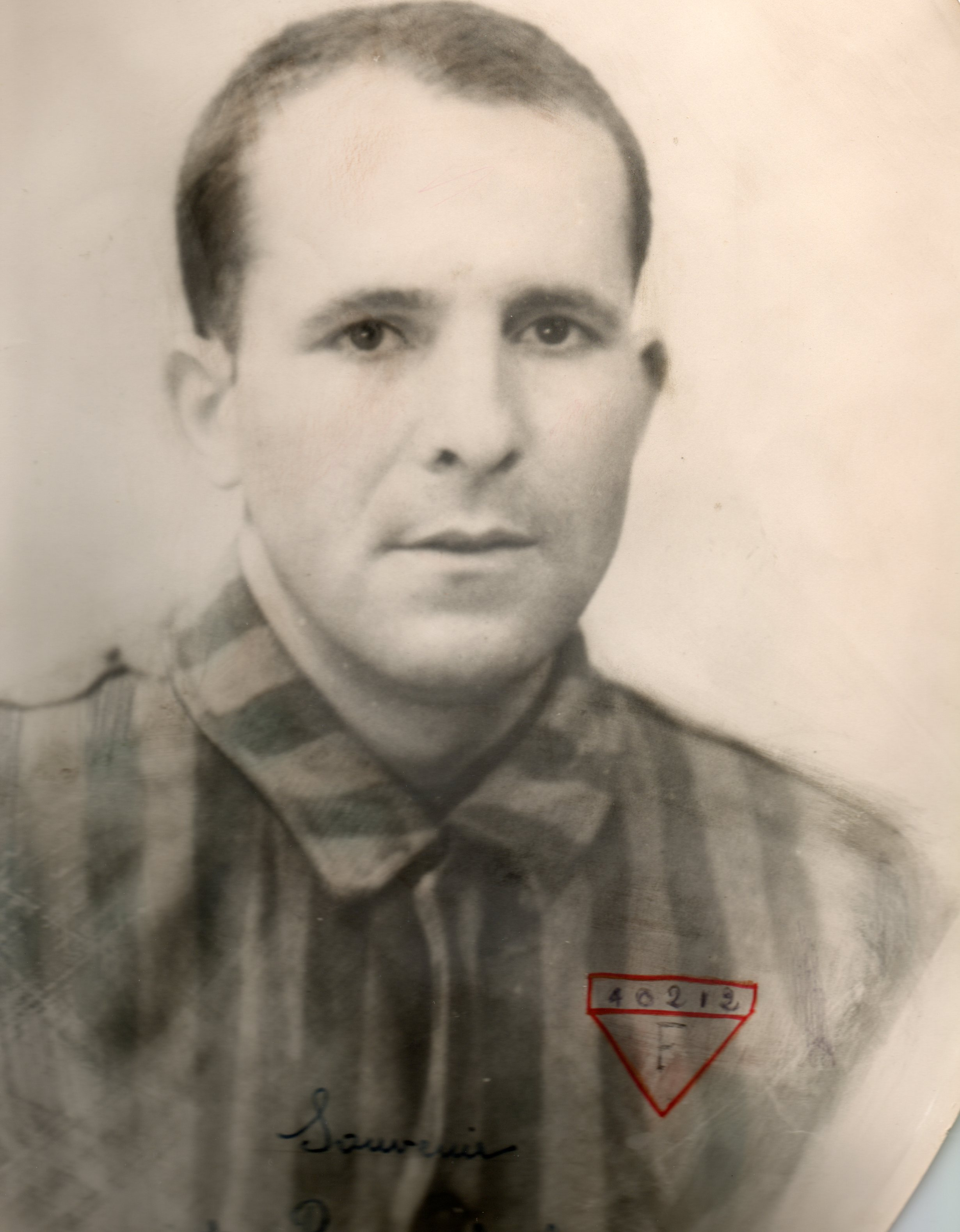
Djaafar Khemdoudi in his Neuengamme clothes after being deported there

Djaafar Khemdoudi was a member of the French resistance during World War II. During his time in France, he forged health certificates and issued false documents, helping to save many individuals from the Compulsory Work Service (Service du Travail Obligatoire or STO) and also Jewish children from the cities of Saint-Fons and Vénissieux. After being captured by the Germans, Khemdoudi was deported to the concentration camp of Neuengamme, to the concentration camp of Malchow and then to Ravensbrück. He survived the camps, and, after the war, returned to France, where he lived the rest of his life. Khemdoudi is considered to have been part of the "indigenous resistance"—a term used for Resistance members from North Africa. Like many such persons, Khemdoudi's actions during the war received very little attention after his death.

=== Refik Veseli ===
Most of the 2,000 Jews of Albania were sheltered by the mostly Muslim population. Refik Veseli, a 17-year-old Muslim boy, took in the family of Mosa and Gabriela Mandil, including their five-year-old son Gavra and his sister Irena, then refugees from Belgrade but originally from Novi Sad, for whom he had been working as an apprentice in their Tirana photographic shop. When the Germans took over from the Italians, he took them, and another Jewish family on a long night journey to his family village at Kruja, where they were protected by his parents until the war's end, some 9 months later, even against Enver Hoxha's partisans. His example inspired his whole village to risk their lives in order to protect Jews. On receiving Gavra Mandil's request for them to be recognized as righteous, the authorities of Yad Vashem inscribed both Refka and Drita Veseli in 1988 among the Righteous. The story became better known after Albania's surviving Jewish community was allowed to perform aliyah in the 1990s.

Many survivors told how their Albanian hosts vied for the privilege of offering sanctuary, on the grounds that it was an Islamic ethical obligation. (Note: Paldail in his forward to Norman H. Gershman, Besa: Muslims Who Saved Jews in World War II, 2008 p.xiv., attributes the extremely high survival rate to the code of besa or one's word of honour. Gershman quotes the Veselis as saying:'We never received any money from our Jewish guests. Besa exists in every Albanian soul. Our parents were devout Muslims and believed, as we do, that every knock on the door is a welcome from God.'(p.90)) Since that date, a further 50 Albanians have been registered among the ranks of the Righteous, such as Arslan Rezniqi.

=== Selahattin Ülkümen ===
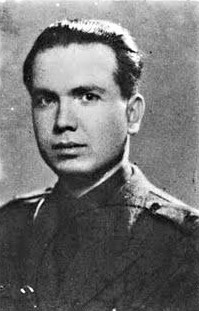
Selahattin Ülkümen during his military service at the 1930s.

Selahattin Ülkümen was the consul-general of Turkey on the island of Rhodes. On 19 July 1944, the Gestapo ordered all of the island's Jewish population to gather at its headquarters: ostensibly they were to register for "temporary transportation to a small island nearby", but in reality they were gathered for transport to Auschwitz and its gas chambers. Ülkümen went to the German commanding officer, General Ulrich Kleemann, to remind him that Turkey was neutral in World War II. He asked for the release of the Jews who were Turkish citizens, and also their spouses and relatives; many of the latter being Italian and Greek citizens. At first the commander refused, stating that under Nazi law, all Jews were considered Jews foremost and had to go to the concentration camps. Ülkümen responded with "under Turkish law all citizens were equal. We didn't differentiate between citizens who were Jewish, Christian or Muslim." Ulkümen managed to save approximately 50 Jews, 13 of them Turkish citizens. In protecting those who were not Turkish citizens, he clearly acted on his own initiative.

In one case, survivor Albert Franko was on a transport to Auschwitz. Whilst still in Greek territory, he was taken off the train thanks to the intervention of Ulkumen, who was informed that Franko's wife was a Turkish citizen. Another survivor, Matilda Toriel relates that she was a Turkish citizen living in Rhodes and married to an Italian citizen. On July 18, 1944, all the Jews were told to appear at Gestapo headquarters the following day. As she prepared to enter the building, Ülkümen approached her and told her not to go in. It was the first time she had ever met him. He told her to wait until he had managed to release her husband. As her husband later told her, Ülkümen requested that the Germans release the Turkish citizens and their families, who numbered only 15 at the time. However, Ülkümen added another 25-30 people to the list whom he knew had allowed their citizenship to lapse. The Gestapo, suspecting him, demanded to see their papers, which they did not have. Ulkumen however returned to the Gestapo building, insisting that according to Turkish law, spouses of Turkish citizens were considered to be citizens themselves, and demanded their release. Matilda later discovered that no such law existed, that Ülkümen had made it up to save them. In the end, all those on Ülkümen's list were released.

=== The Grand Mosque of Paris ===
The Grand Mosque of Paris is one the largest and the oldest mosques in France. During the German occupation of France, the mosque became a place of shelter for members of the French Resistance and Jews escaping Nazi persecution. Algerian members of the Francs-Tireurs et Partisans (FTP; Partisan Snipers) sheltered and protected British parachutists who landed in France. Under the oversight of the first rector, Si Kaddour Benghabrit, French Jews were given papers declaring them Muslims as protection, including the famous Algerian-Jewish singer Salim Halali.

=== Nurija Pozderac ===
Nurija Pozderac was a Bosnian politician and resistance leader during World War Two. He was the Vice President of the Executive Board of the Anti-Fascist Council of National Liberation of Yugoslavia and a member of the Yugoslav Muslim Organization. After Yugoslavia was invaded by Nazi Germany, the Nazis created the 'Independent State of Croatia', a fascist puppet state ruled by the Ustaše. Pozderac was offered a position in the government, but refused. Pozderac became a partisan, joining in the fight against fascists. Though he was killed in 1943 during Operation Schwarz, he was still able to personally save and shelter thousands of individuals and families from persecution. He was later honored as a 'Righteous Among the Nations'.

=== Mohammed Helmy ===
Mohammed Helmy was an Egyptian doctor who moved to Berlin in the 1920s. Because he was Arab, he was fired from his hospital in 1938 and barred from practicing medicine. He was also forbidden to marry his German fiancée, Emmi Ernst. He was interned by the German government until the Egyptian government secured his release in 1941.

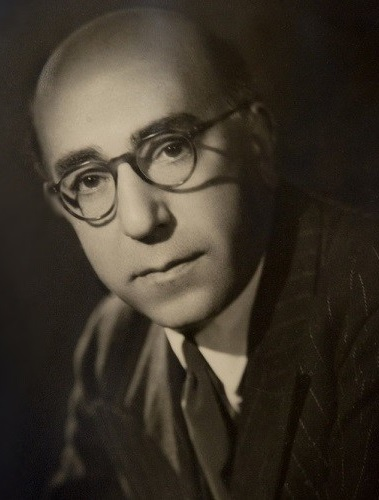
Abdol Hossein Sardari

After his release, Helmy was conscripted as a doctor in Charlottenburg. While there, he wrote sick notes for foreign workers and Germans to help them avoid conscription. During the deportations of Berlin's Jews, Anna Boros was sheltered by Helmy, despite being himself targeted by the Nazi regime until the end of the war. When he was under police investigation, Helmy arranged for Boros to hide elsewhere, doing everything in his power to protect her. He obtained a certificate attesting to Boros’ conversion to Islam and a marriage certificate that she was married to an Egyptian man in a ceremony held in Helmy's home. Helmy also provided assistance to Boros’ mother, Julianna; her stepfather, Georg Wehr; and her grandmother, Cecilie Rudnik. He arranged for Rudnik to be hidden in the home of a German friend, Frieda Szturmann. He was later recognized by Vad Vashem for his actions in 2013.

=== Abdol Hossein Sardari ===
Abdol Hossein Sardari was an Iranian diploment based in Paris during the Holocaust. When he ran the Iranian consular office in Paris in 1942, he successfully argued that Iranian Jews were 'Aryans', saving the not only Iranian Jewish community in France at the time but also non-Iranian Jews whom Sardari wrote false Iranian passports for. Sardari ultimately saved 2,000 to 3,000 Jewish lives. Passports were issued for entire families and included French or non-Iranian partners. He was later dubbed the "Iranian Schindler".

== See also ==
- Islamic–Jewish relations
- Relations between Nazi Germany and the Arab world
