= Kodheli =

Kodheli is an Albanian surname. Notable people with the surname include:

- Flonja Kodheli, Albanian-Belgian actress, musician, pianist, and composer
- Mati Kodheli (1862–1881), Albanian photographer
- Mimi Kodheli (born 1964), Albanian economist and politician
