= Mati Kodheli =

Albanian photographer

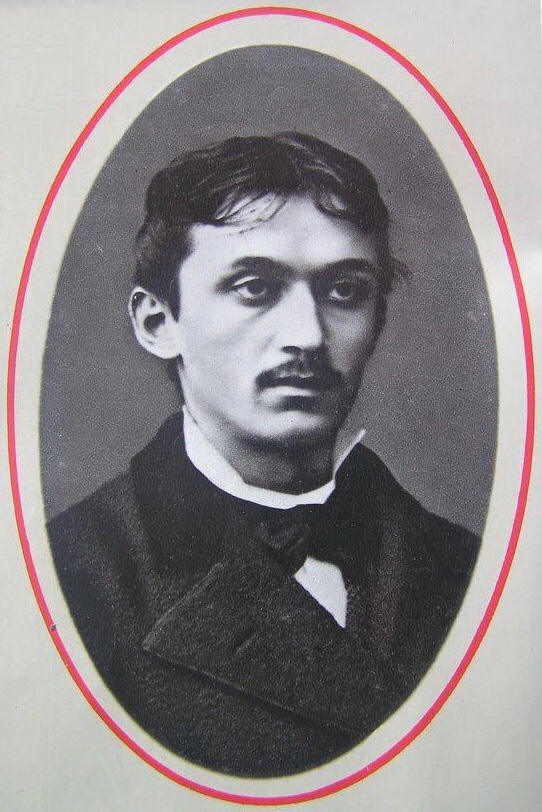
- Portrait of Mati Kodheli
- Born: 1862; Shkodër, Ottoman Empire
- Died: 1881 (aged 18–19); Shkodër, Ottoman Empire
- Known for: Photography

Mati Kodheli (1862–1881) was an ethnically Albanian photographer in the Ottoman Empire who served as an apprentice to master photographer Pietro Marubi. He was the older brother of Kel Kodheli.

== Life ==
Mati Kodheli was born in Shkodër to a lower-middle-class family. His father Rrok Kodheli, worked as a gardener at the estate of Italian photographer Pietro Marubi from Piacenza, who had recently settled in Albania after being forced to leave his native country for being accused of involvement in the murder of the local town mayor.

Mati was sent to study photography at the Sebastianutti & Benque studio in Trieste, Italy. He died prematurely at the young age of nineteen, from tuberculosis.

Only two negatives of his work collection have survived, a 1878 photograph of the Shkodër Musical Band, whom he was a member of, and a photograph of his childhood friend Kolë Idromeno.
