= List of Albanian photographers =

This is a list of Albanian photographers.

== Photographers from Albania ==
- Jani Zengo (1832–1913)
- Kristo Sulidhi (1858–1938)
- Kolë Idromeno (1860–1939)
- Mati Kodheli (1862–1881)
- Kel Marubi (1870–1940)
- Geg Marubi (1907–1984)
- Refik Veseli (1926–2000)

== Photographers from Kosovo ==
- Rifo Dobra (1952)
- Fadil Berisha (1973)

== Photographers from North Macedonia ==
- Bajazid Doda (1888–1933)
- Mimoza Veliu (1979)

== Albanian-American Photographers ==
- Gjon Mili (1904–1984)
- Burim Myftiu (1961)
- George Tames (1919–1994)
- Emin Kadi
