= Zengo =

Zengo may refer to:

- Zengő, a mountain in southern Hungary
- Zengő Motorsport, a Hungarian motor racing team
- Zengo Station, a railway station in Toyoake, Aichi Prefecture, Japan
- Zengo Yoshida (1885–1966), a Japanese admiral
- Zengo (surname)
