= Marubi National Museum of Photography =

Marubi National Museum of Photography Marubi
- Muzeu Kombëtar i Fotografisë Marubi

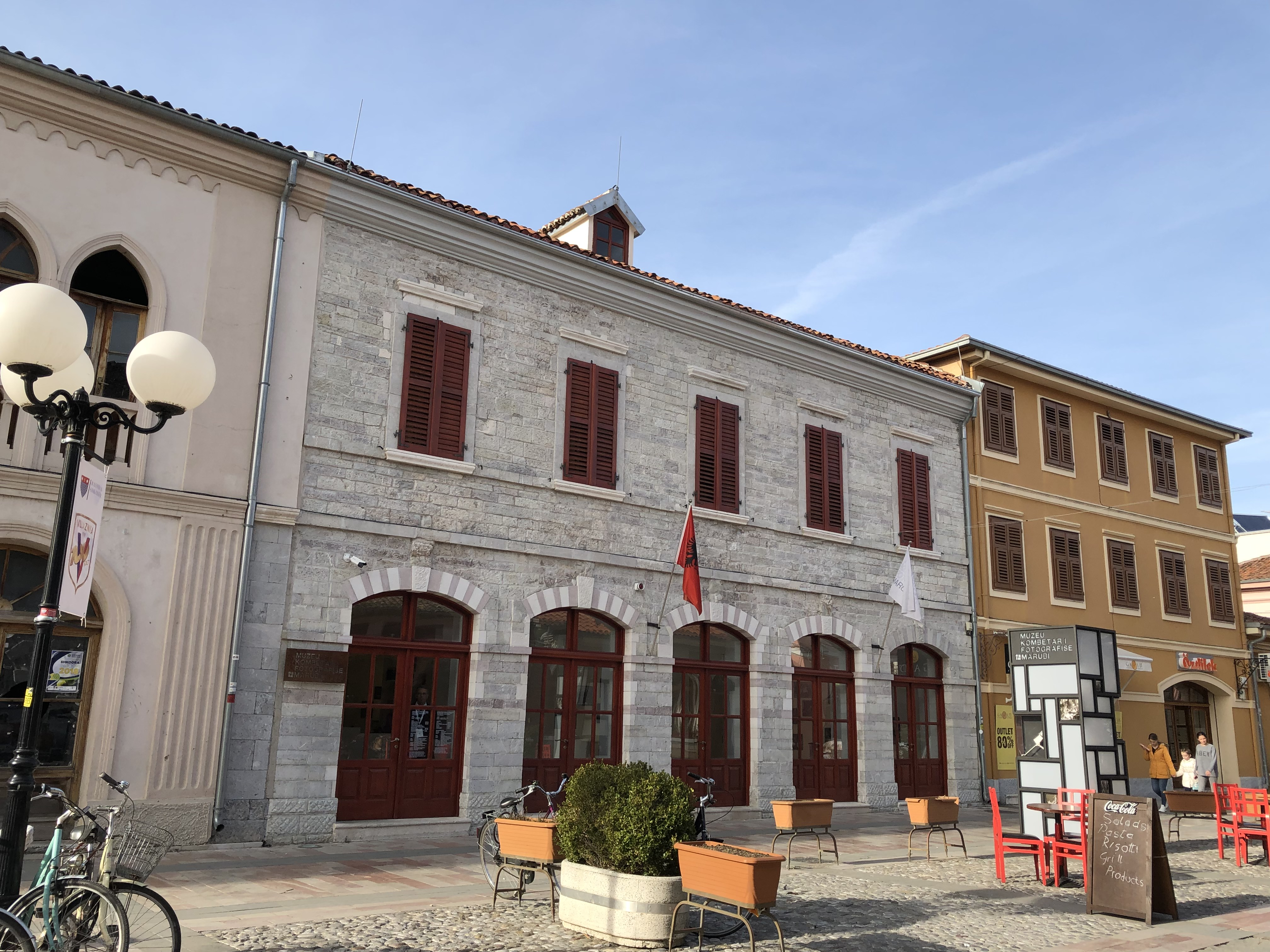
- Facade of the museum
- Established: 9 May 2016
- Location: Shkodër, Albania
- Coordinates: 42°04′07″N 19°30′56″E
- Type: Art Museum
- Director: Luçjan Bedeni
- Architects: Kolë Idromeno; Casanova + Hernandez (reconstruction)
- Owner: Government of Albania
- Website: marubi.gov.al

Marubi National Museum of Photography (Albanian: Muzeu Kombëtar i Fotografisë Marubi), also known as Marubi Museum, is a museum in Shkodër, Albania.

At the center of the museum project is the legacy of the 'Photo-Studio Marubbi', founded in 1856 by Pietro Marubbi, an Italian painter and photographer who came and settled in Shkodër at the time. The activity of the studio over the years, was directed and enriched by three generations of photographers, until the early 1950s, time when Geg Marubi was forced to give oneself up to the communist collective anonymity, by joining other photographers in the photography unit of the former Repair-Services Cooperative.

In 1970 was founded the Marubi Photo-Studio with around 500,000 negatives in various techniques and formats. Later on, historical images from the archive were (in many cases) used to feed the communist propaganda machine. It was during this period that many of them appeared in the editions of the time manipulated and alienated.

The new museum, projected by the architectural studio Casanova + Hernandez, has been designed as a space which promote the dialogue between tradition and modernity, past and present. The heritage and tradition are emphasized by means of the restoration project of the historic building designed by Kole Idromeno – Albanian artist and architect, former student of Pietro Marubbi – while preserving its structural features.

== Exhibition ==
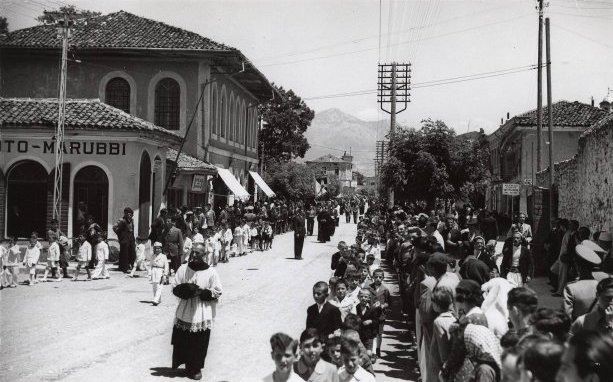
Front entrance of studio "Dritëshkronja" in 1939 with an outside sign "FOTO MARUBBI".

From a Studio to an Archive and later a Museum of Photography

=== Marubi collection ===
- Dedë Jakova, Curated by Lek M. Gjeloshi, 18.09.2020
- Dynasty Marubi: A Hundred Years of Albanian Studio Photography, Curated by Kim Knoppers, 15.02-02.06.2019
- Angjelin Nenshati. A witness between two ephocs, Curated by Luçjan Bedeni & Lek M.Gjeloshi, 22.06.-01.10.2018
- Manipulation, Curated by Luçjan Bedeni, 03.08. -10.10.2017
- Long live!, Curated by Blerta Hoçia, 21.04-23.09.2017
- The Two Roads of Idromeno, Curated by Adrian Paci, 26.01. -20.04.2017

=== Albanian photographic collections ===
- Photographers of Southeastern Albania, Curated by Gjergj Spathari, 07.06-27.10.2019
- Marubi celebrates the originals, Curated by Rudolf Schäfer, 11.04. -30.07.2017
- The meeting tent of a courtyard, Curated by Luçjan Bedeni, 09.05.2016-20.01.2017
- Women from the Marubi archive, Kuruar nga Kim Knoppers, 09.05.2016-20.01.2017

=== International photography collections ===
- Nadar. Rule and caprice, Curated by Michel Poivert, In collaboration with Jeu de Paume, Paris, 10.10.2018-03.02.2019

=== Albanian and international contemporary artists ===
- Armin Linke: A card or maybe two. Modalities of photography, Curated by Matteo Balduzzi, 11.01. -16.03.2020
- Seven Albanian photographers. A residency, Curated by François Cheval, 11.01.2019-07.01.2020
- Moira Ricci. Lookaftering, Curated by Lek M. Gjeloshi, 23.02-01.06.2018
- Lala Meredith-Vula. Wisdom now and forever, Curated by Monika Szewczyk, 20.10.2017-21.01.2018

=== Traveling exhibitions ===
- Atheist Museum, Curated by Luçjan Bedeni, PhEST International Festival of Art and Photography, Monopoli, 06.09-04.11.2019
- Marubi archive. The photographic ritual, Curated by Zef Paci, Triennale di Milano, 16.11 -09.12.2018
- Kolë Idromeno, Curated by Luçjan Bedeni & Lek M.Gjeloshi, PhEST International Festival of Art and Photography, Monopoli, 06.09-04.11.2018
- Dynasty Marubi: A Hundred Years of Albanian Studio Photography, Curated by Kim Knoppers, Foam Museum of Photography, Amsterdam, 16.09-27.11.2016
