= Molère =

Commune in Haute-Pyrénées, France

- Part of Benqué-Molère
- Location of Molère
- Location within France Location within Occitanie
- Coordinates: 43°05′55″N 0°17′52″E
- Country: France
- Region: Occitania
- Department: Hautes-Pyrénées
- Arrondissement: Bagnères-de-Bigorre
- Canton: La Vallée de l'Arros et des Baïses
- Commune: Benqué-Molère
- Area^{1}: 1.74 km^{2} (0.67 sq mi)
- Elevation: 490 m (1,610 ft)
- Highest elevation: 611 m (2,005 ft)
- Lowest elevation: 390 m (1,280 ft)
- Population (2014): 36
  - Density: 21/km^{2} (54/sq mi)
- Time zone: UTC+01:00 (CET)
  - Summer (DST): UTC+02:00 (CEST)
- Postal code: 65130
- ^{1} French Land Register data, which excludes lakes, ponds, glaciers > 1 km^{2} (0.386 sq mi or 247 acres) and river estuaries.

Molère (French pronunciation: [mɔlɛʁ]; Gascon: Molèra) is a former commune in the Hautes-Pyrénées department in south-western France. On 1 January 2017, it was merged into the new commune Benqué-Molère. Its population was 36 in 2014.

== See also ==
- Communes of the Hautes-Pyrénées department
