= Motra Tone =

Painting by Kolë Idromeno

Sister Tone or Motra Tone
- Motra Tone (Albanian)
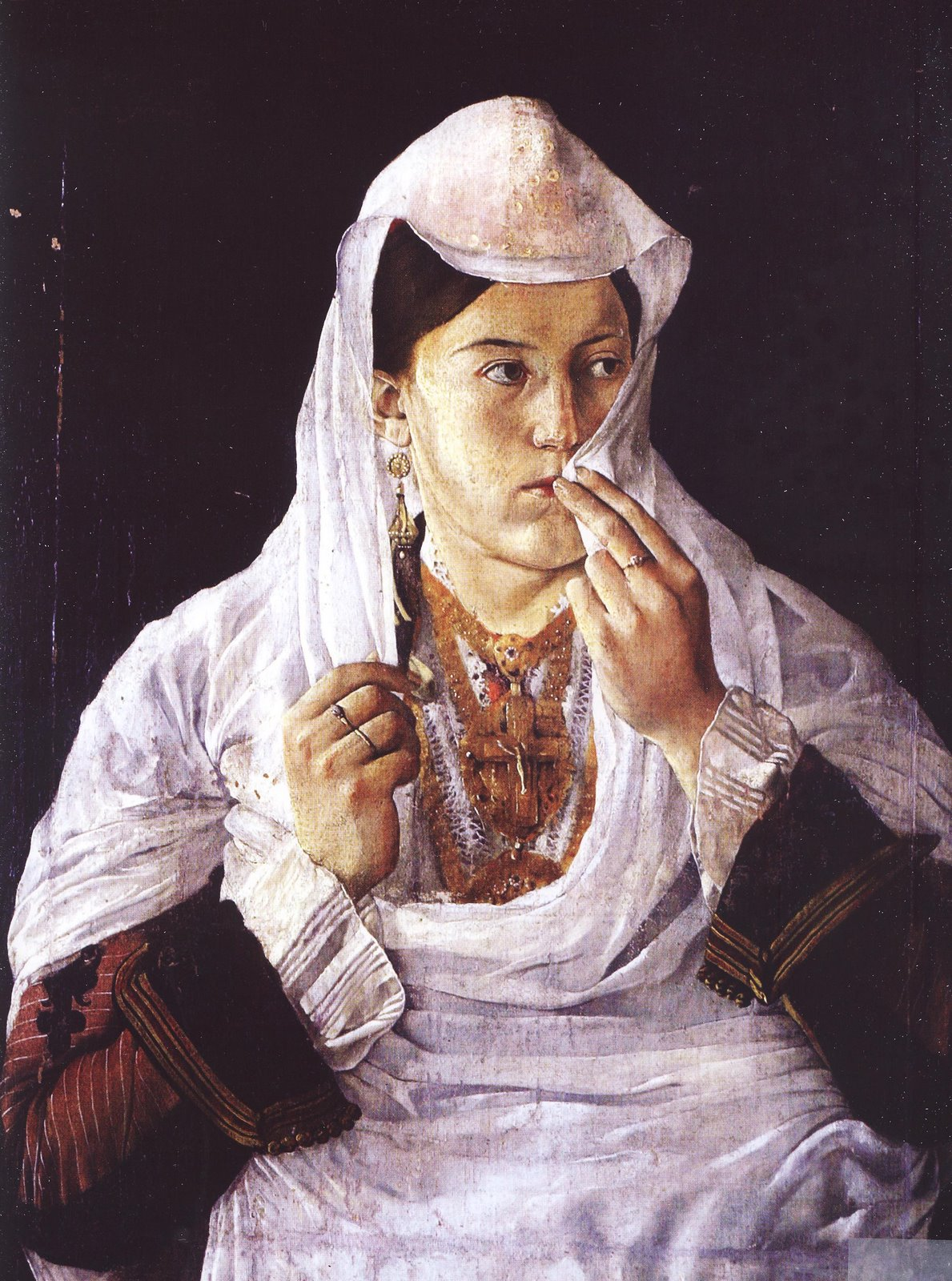
- Artist: Kolë Idromeno
- Year: 1883
- Location: National Art Gallery of Albania; Tirana

The Motra Tone is a half-length portrait of a woman by the Albanian artist Kolë Idromeno. Idromeno painted it in 1883. The picture is part of the collection of National Art Gallery of Albania.
