= Zengo (surname) =

Zengo is an Albanian surname that may refer to the following notable people:

- Androniqi Zengo Antoniu (née Zengo; 1913–2000), Albanian painter
- Jani Zengo (1832–1913), Albanian photographer, calligrapher, teacher and priest
- Sofia Zengo Papadhimitri (née Zengo; 1915–1976), Albanian painter, sister of Androniqi
