= Benqué =

Commune in Haute-Pyrénées, France

- Part of Benqué-Molère
- Coat of arms
- Location of Benqué
- Location within France Location within Occitanie
- Coordinates: 43°05′44″N 0°17′01″E
- Country: France
- Region: Occitania
- Department: Hautes-Pyrénées
- Arrondissement: Bagnères-de-Bigorre
- Canton: La Vallée de l'Arros et des Baïses
- Commune: Benqué-Molère
- Area^{1}: 2.05 km^{2} (0.79 sq mi)
- Elevation: 488 m (1,601 ft)
- Highest elevation: 494 m (1,621 ft)
- Lowest elevation: 329 m (1,079 ft)
- Population (2014): 83
  - Density: 40/km^{2} (100/sq mi)
- Time zone: UTC+01:00 (CET)
  - Summer (DST): UTC+02:00 (CEST)
- Postal code: 65130
- ^{1} French Land Register data, which excludes lakes, ponds, glaciers > 1 km^{2} (0.386 sq mi or 247 acres) and river estuaries.

Benqué (French pronunciation: [bɛ̃ke]; Gascon: Benquèr) is a former commune in the Hautes-Pyrénées department in southwestern France. On 1 January 2017, it was merged into the new commune Benqué-Molère.

== See also ==
- Communes of the Hautes-Pyrénées department
