= Pietro Marubi =

Albanian-Italian artist (1832–1903)

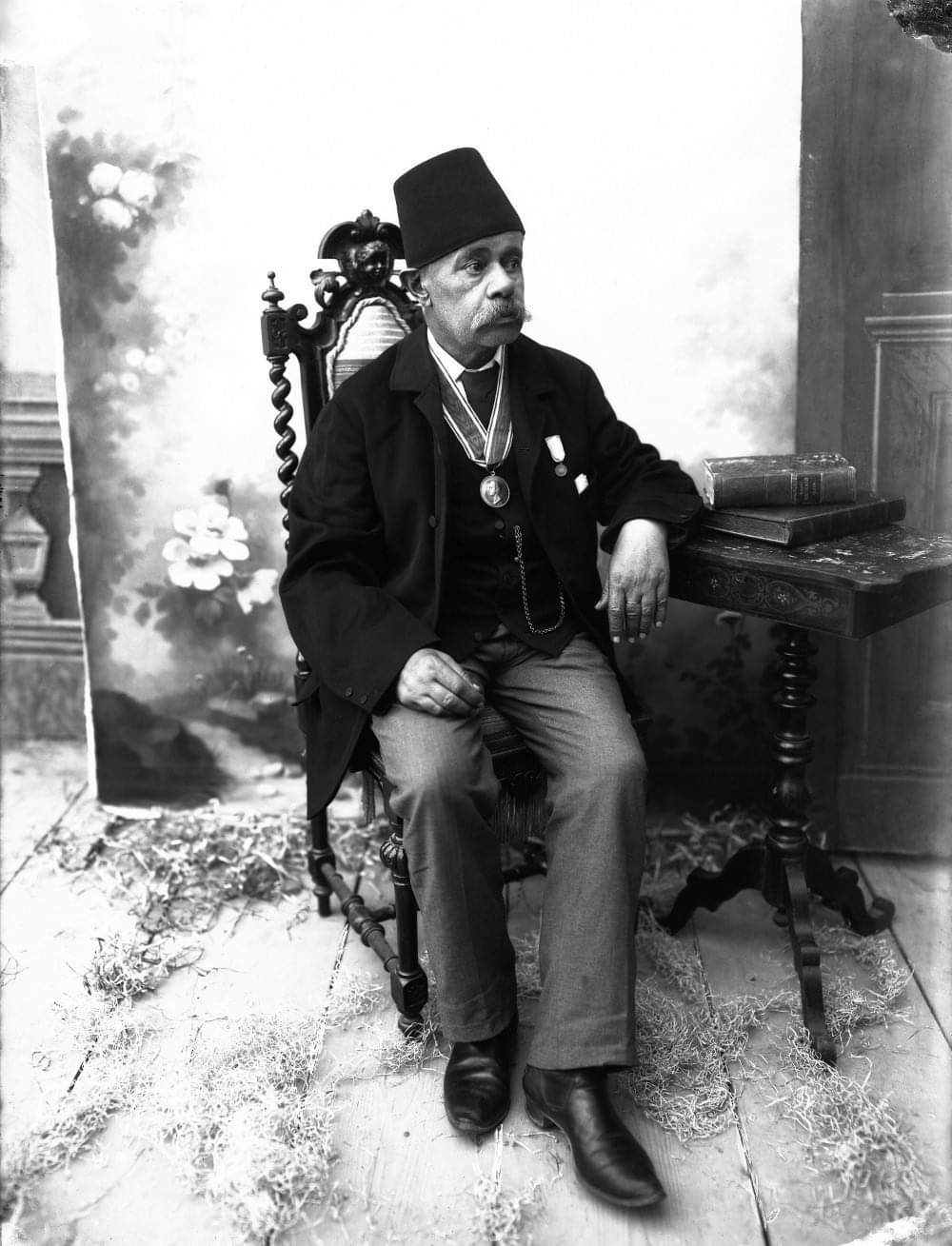
- Photograph of Marubi shortly before his death
- Born: Pietro Marubbi; 1832; Piacenza, Duchy of Parma (now Italy)
- Died: 1903 (aged 70–71); Shkodër, Vilayet of Scutari, Ottoman Empire (now Albania)
- Known for: Photography

Pietro Marubi (Albanian: Pjetër Marubi; 1832–1903) was an Italian painter, sculptor, architect and photographer and founder of the Marubi Studio who spent most of his life in Sanjak of Shkodër, today Albania. Pietro was born in Piacenza, Italy in 1834, in a period of revolution for Europe. In 1856, Marubi was forced to leave Italy because of his participation in the Garibaldi movement, he moved to Shkodër, where he opened the first photography studio, which was named Dritëshkronja.

== Biography ==
=== Early life ===
Pietro Marubi was born in 1832 in the city of Piacenza, then part of the Duchy of Parma. In young age, he was fascinated and involved in the political and social movement that consolidated different states of the Italian peninsula into the single unitary state. As such, he was considered supporter of Garibaldis expedition against Austro-Hungarians. In 1856, he was forced to leave his native country after being accused of involvement in the murder of the Duke of Parma. Together with his Italian wife Maria-Marietta he tried to get asylum in the Ottoman Empire, heading to Corfu, from where he leaves to reach Vlorë, but without taking asylum. Shortly after staying in this city, he decided to move to Shkodër, populated by Catholics and a small community of Italians in the city.

=== Early career ===
In Shkodra, he decided to dedicate himself to his passion for photography, and so decided to open a photographic studio (in 1865) that he named "Dritëshkronja" (meaning Written with the light). He was called Pjetër by the locals, which is the Albanian equivalent of the name Pietro. During the first months of staying he met Arsen Idromeno, with whom he became a family friend. Kolë Idromeno, Arsen's son, becomes Marubi's apprentice until he helped him to go in Venice to complete the studies at the Accademia di Belle Arti, the academy of fine arts.

Pjetër befriends a mountain man, Rrok Kodheli, and brings his two sons Mati and Mikel Kodheli under his wing to teach them photography. The first of his apprentices will be sent to the Academy of Arts in Venice and later in Trieste in Sebastianutti & Benque photographic studio. Unfortunately, Mati Kodheli died suddenly in 1881 at the age of 19.

After the death of his brother, it was Mikel Kodheli who took the role of assistant at a photographic studio. Enthusiastic, eager to learn, Kel as he was called, was also sent to Trieste to be trained as a photographer.

=== Career and photography ===
The first picture of Pjetër Marubi dates back to 1858, in which was photographed Hamza bey Kazazi, at that time a patriot and leader of the movement for independence from the Ottoman Empire in Albania. At that time, Marubi was only 24 years old and so began his career as a photographer, where he would pursue until the last days of his life. Many of early works of Marubi show the political events, important figures and events that have changed the country's history, such as the League of Prizren (1878) and the Mirdita Uprising (1876–1877). At first, Marubi photographed Shkodra's delegation attending the League of Prizren, which today is considered one of the rare testimonies of that organization.

The earlier photos of Marubi were black and white 21 x 27 cm, 26 x 31 cm and 30 x 40 cm. Later taking new tripod and portable cameras, he made 13 x 18 cm and 18 x 24 cm photos. Also the collodion plates were prepared by himself in his atelier. In his works all the social classes of the country were indistinctly represented. From shepherds, to criminals, passing by famous actors or local rulers of the Ottoman Empire.

Marubi often worked as a photojournalist for foreign magazines, such as L'Illustration, The Illustrated London News and the Italian newspapers La Guerra d'Oriente and L'Illustrazione Italiana. His photos were published in these newspapers to show the events of the time.

=== Death and legacy ===
Pjetër Marubi died in 1903, in Sanjak of Shkodër, at the time Ottoman Empire, probably 69 years old. Although married to Marietta, but childless, Pjëter Marubi left his studio, his works, and everything else he possessed as a legacy to his pupil, Mikel "Kel" Kodheli. After the death of Pjeter, Mikel Kodheli, as a gesture of gratitude, changed his own last name to Marubi, keeping alive the memory and the work of his master.

Kel Marubi, as he is widely known, continued to work in the footsteps of his master and his contribution in photography is as important as Pjetër Marubi. The Marubi Dynasty continued for three generations, with Pjetër, Kel and Gegë Marubi, Keli's son.

== Works ==
=== Notable photographs ===
- Hamza bey Kazazi, Shkodër, 1858
- Boy on the donkey, Shkodër, 1875
- Young Muslim woman, Shkodër, 1884

=== Gallery ===
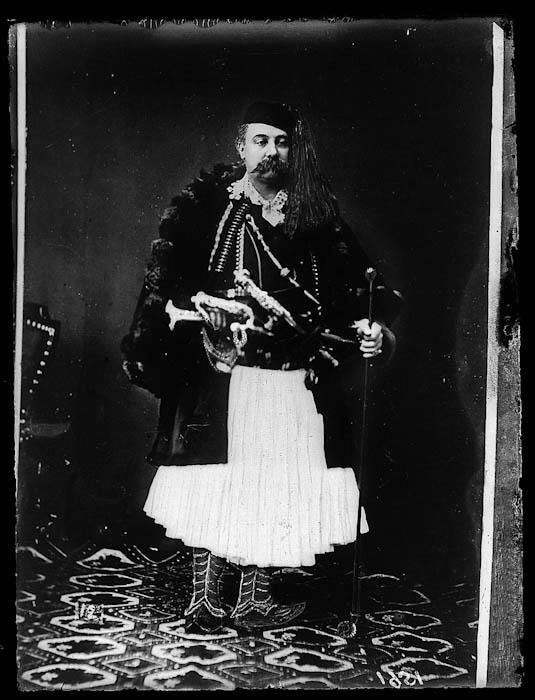

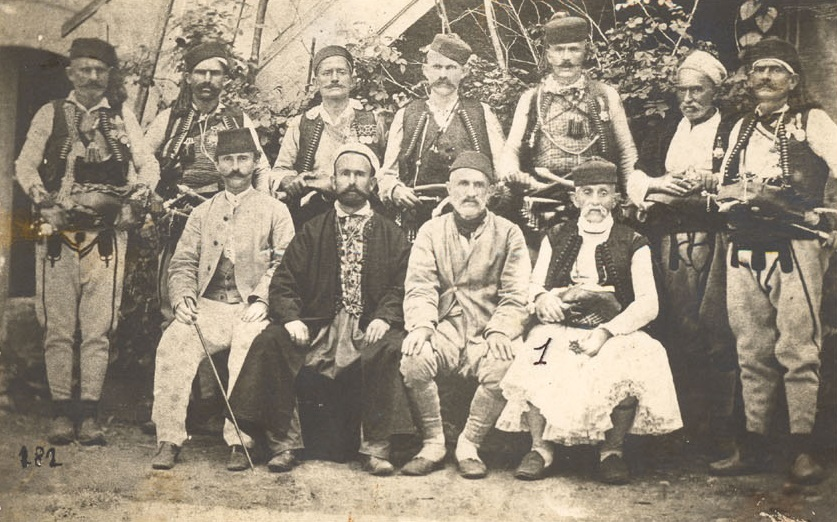

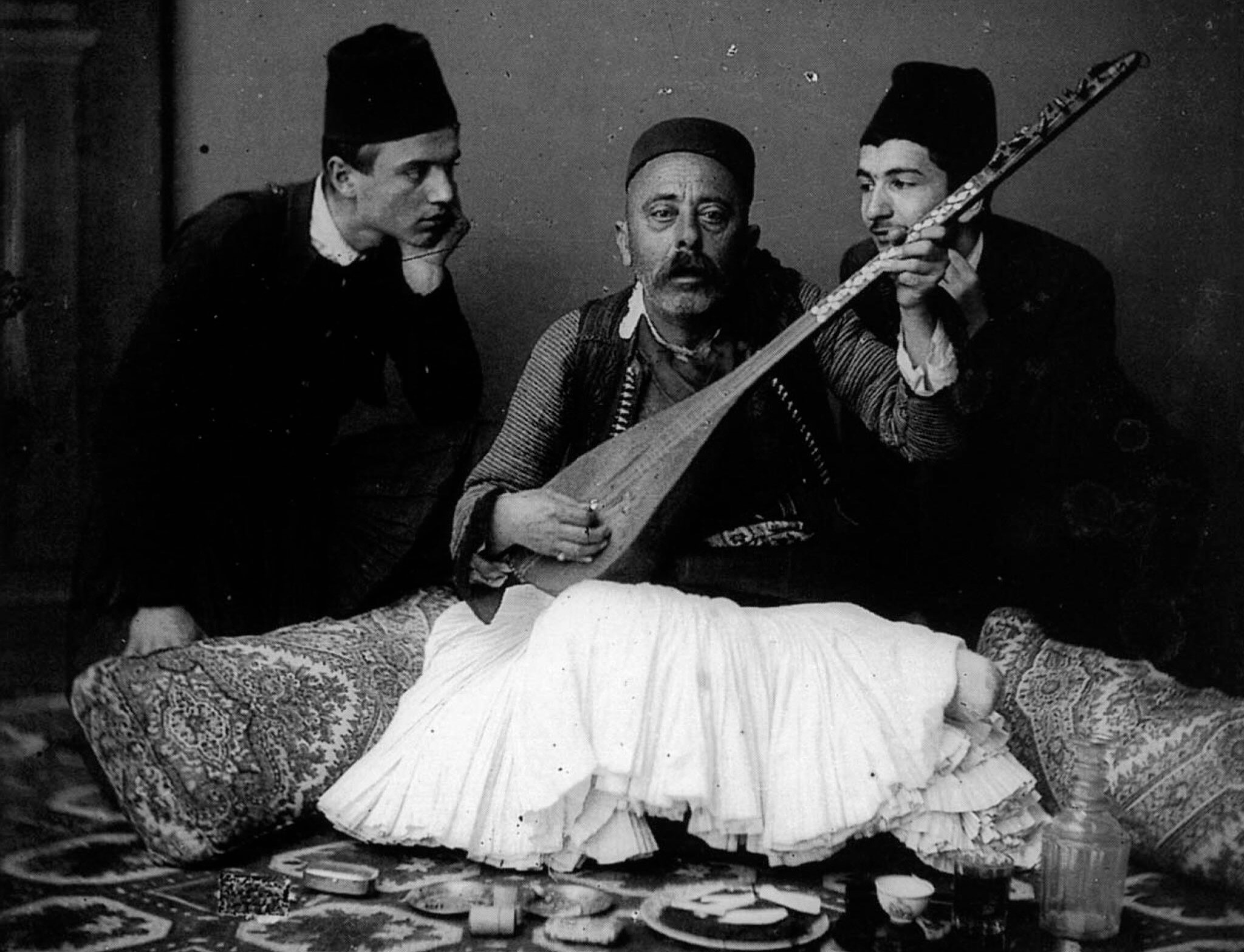

== See also ==
- Kel Marubi
- National Museum of Photography "Marubi"
