= Jani Zengo =

Albanian photographer

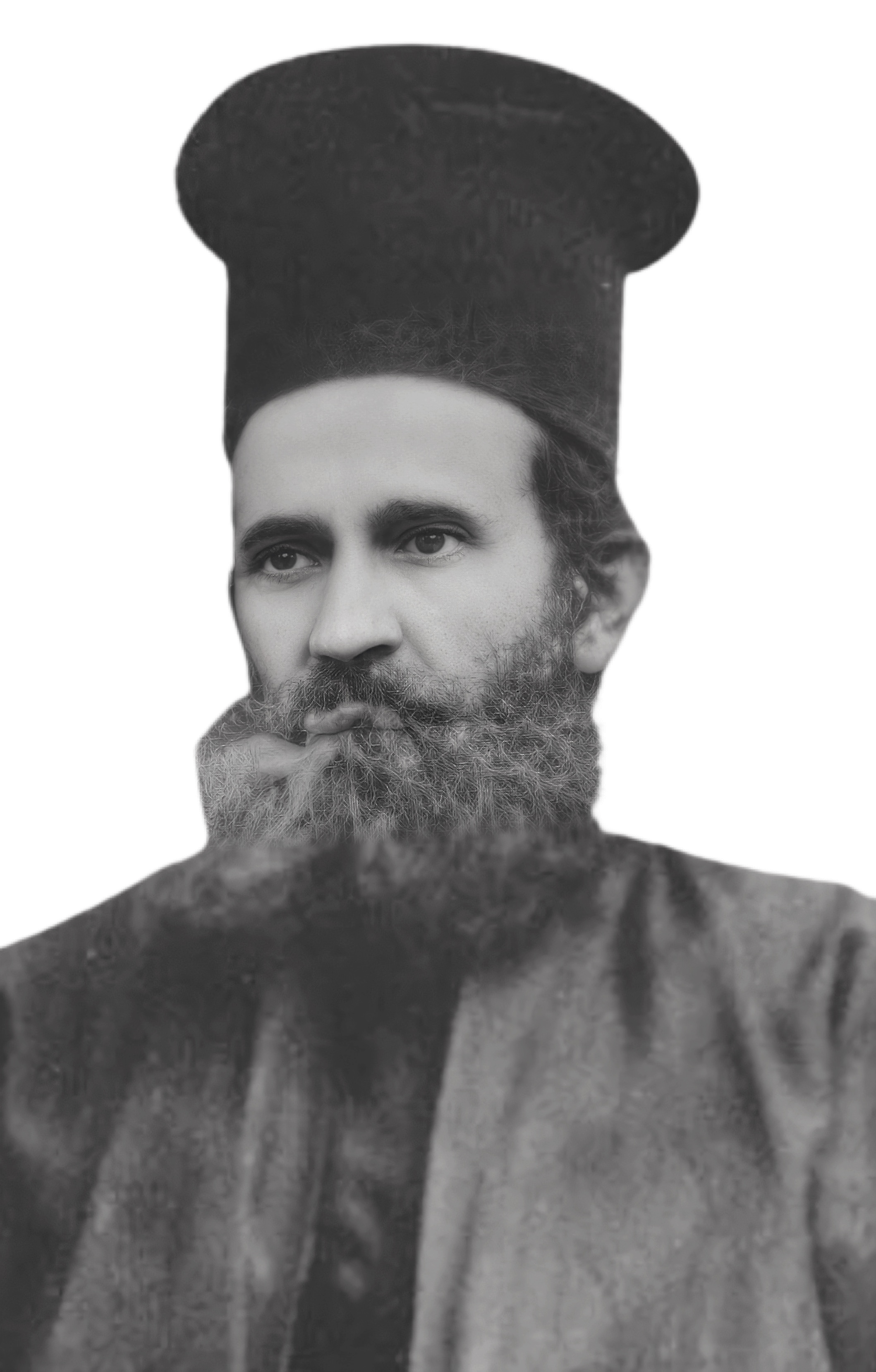
- A rare photo of Jani Zengo
- Born: 1832; Dardhë, Ottoman Empire
- Died: 1913 (aged 80–81); Dardhë, Albania
- Known for: Photography

Jani Ndoni Zengo (Papajani) (1832–1913) was an Albanian photographer, calligrapher, teacher and priest. He is widely recognized as the first person to practice photography in Albania.

== Life ==
Papa Jani Zengo was born on 17 January 1832 in the mountainous village of Dardhë, southeastern Albania, the son of local priest Andon Zengo (Papa Ndoni) and a homemaker. Zengo finished his elementary schooling in Dardhë and later attended the Greek Gymnasium of Korçë. He was sent by his father to Mount Athos, Greece where he learned the craft of xylography which he practiced as a profession. There, the young Zengo became acquainted with the newly formed craft of photography. Two years later he returned to Albania and began work as a carpenter. From 1859 to 1862 he was appointed teacher in Ziçisht and then Pisoder. In a manuscript dated 15.01.1866, Jani is mentioned to have created an alphabet in the Albanian language containing 33 letters. In 1869, he married a local villager by the name of Tushe Gjerazi and shortly thereafter migrated back to Greece, where he worked as a bookkeeper in the city of Larissa and then as a wood decorator and photographer in Thessaly province. Zengo eventually returned to his village of Dardhë in 1882 where after several years is ordained a priest. His first recorded photograph was that of a local school in his village, dated in 1862.
