= Arslan Rezniqi =

Kosovan-Albanian Holocaust activist

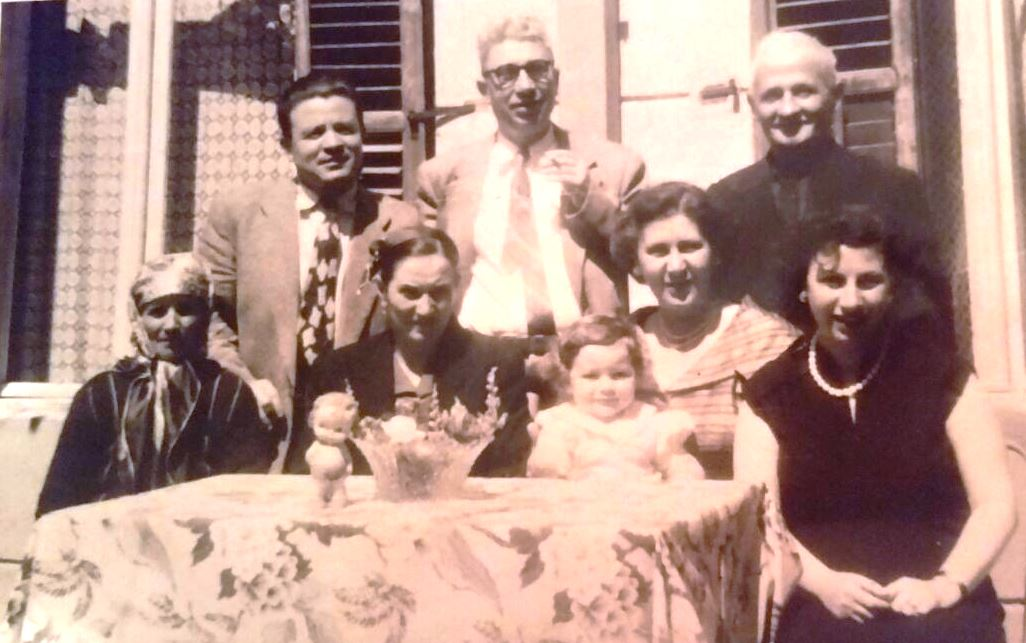
Abravanel and Rezniqi family in 1957

Arslan Rezniqi was the first Kosovan Albanian to receive the title Righteous Among the Nations. He received the award posthumously on 2 December 2008, for housing 42 Jewish families and transporting 400 Jews to safety in Albania during the Holocaust, risking his life in the process. He was a vegetable wholesaler, who was originally from Deçan.
