= Kafja e Madhe =

- Interactive map of Kafja e Madhe
- Location: Shkoder
- Coordinates: 42.066236°N 19.513596°E
- Type: restaurant
- Material: stone
- Beginning date: 1920s
- Restored date: 1987-1988

Kafja e Madhe is an old restaurant located in the city of Shkodër, Albania. The building is listed as a monument of architecture by the Institute of Monuments for Albania. In the first half of the 20th century, the restaurant was regarded as part of the luxury life of the city.

== History ==
The construction of the building was started by the Ashik family in 1920. Under unknown circumstances, the building was sold to the Luka family some time afterwards. After 1945, the building – like the majority of commercial venues of Shkodër – was transferred to state ownership. regardless, it managed to keep its original purpose as a restaurant, bar, and hotel. In 1960 the building was declared a cultural monument of architecture. The building was professionally restored in 1987–1988, in spite of the bad economic situation in the country at the time. Although by 1992 it stopped being used as a restaurant, and a casino started operating here, reportedly until 1997.

== Current status ==
As of 2013, the building is unoccupied and awaits total restoration.
