= Refik Veseli =

Albanian photographer

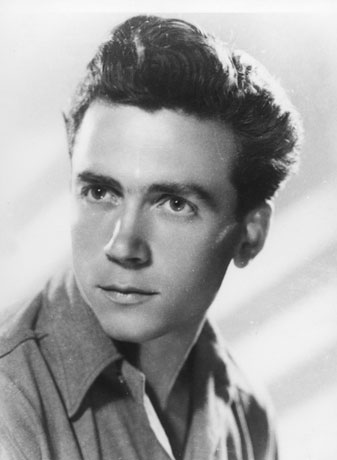
- Born: 1 January 1926; Krujë, Albania
- Died: 2000 (aged 74); Tirana, Albania
- Occupation: Photographer

Refik Veseli (1 January 1926–2000) was an Albanian photographer and formerly a co-founder of the Albanian Institute of Monuments. He was decorated along with his family by the state of Israel as Righteous Among the Nations for saving Jews during the Second World War.

== Biography ==
Veseli was a 17 year old Muslim, born and raised in the rural city of Kruja in the mountains of Albania. Refik is one of thousands of Albanians who risked their lives to save the lives of Jews during World War II.

He was president of the Albania-Israel Friendship Society in Tirana.

In 2014, a school was named after him in Berlin, the Refik Veseli Schule.

== Publications ==
- Berati: qutet-muze, 1987, Refik Veseli
- Architectural monuments in Albania, 1973, Refik Veseli
