= Mimoza Veliu =

Albanian photographer, based in Berlin (born 1979)

Mimoza Veliu (born 28 March 1979) is an Albanian photographer, based in Berlin.

At the center of her art photography is the human being who opposes apparent boundaries. In 2008 she was awarded the first prize for art photography from Kosova National Art Gallery together with the colleague from Italy Linda Vukaj Riccomini.

Veliu was born in Tetovo, SR Macedonia, SFR Yugoslavia (now North Macedonia).
