= Benqué-Molère =

- Commune
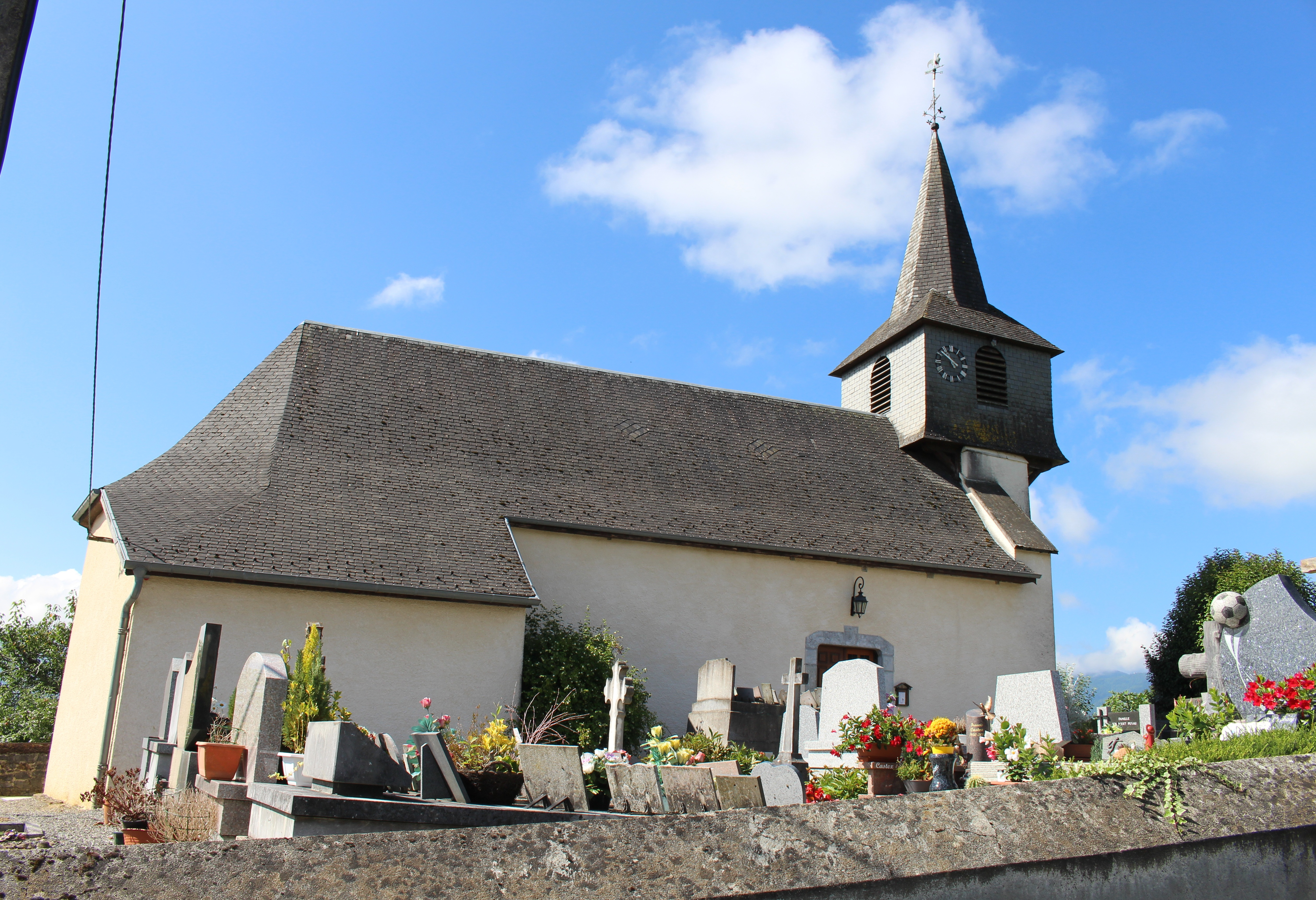
- The church of Saint-Etienne in Benqué
- Location of Benqué-Molère
- Location within France Location within Occitanie
- Coordinates: 43°05′46″N 0°17′02″E
- Country: France
- Region: Occitania
- Department: Hautes-Pyrénées
- Arrondissement: Bagnères-de-Bigorre
- Canton: La Vallée de l'Arros et des Baïses
- Intercommunality: Plateau de Lannemezan

Government
  - Mayor (2020–2026): Christophe Muse
- Area^{1}: 3.79 km^{2} (1.46 sq mi)
- Population (2023): 140
  - Density: 37/km^{2} (96/sq mi)
- Time zone: UTC+01:00 (CET)
  - Summer (DST): UTC+02:00 (CEST)
- INSEE/Postal code: 65081 /65130
- ^{1} French Land Register data, which excludes lakes, ponds, glaciers > 1 km^{2} (0.386 sq mi or 247 acres) and river estuaries.

Benqué-Molère (French pronunciation: [bɛ̃ke mɔlɛʁ]; Occitan: Benquèr e Molèra) is a commune in the department of Hautes-Pyrénées, southwestern France. The municipality was established on 1 January 2017 by merger of the former communes of Benqué (the seat) and Molère.

== See also ==
- Communes of the Hautes-Pyrénées department
