= Kolë Idromeno =

Albanian artist (1860-1939)

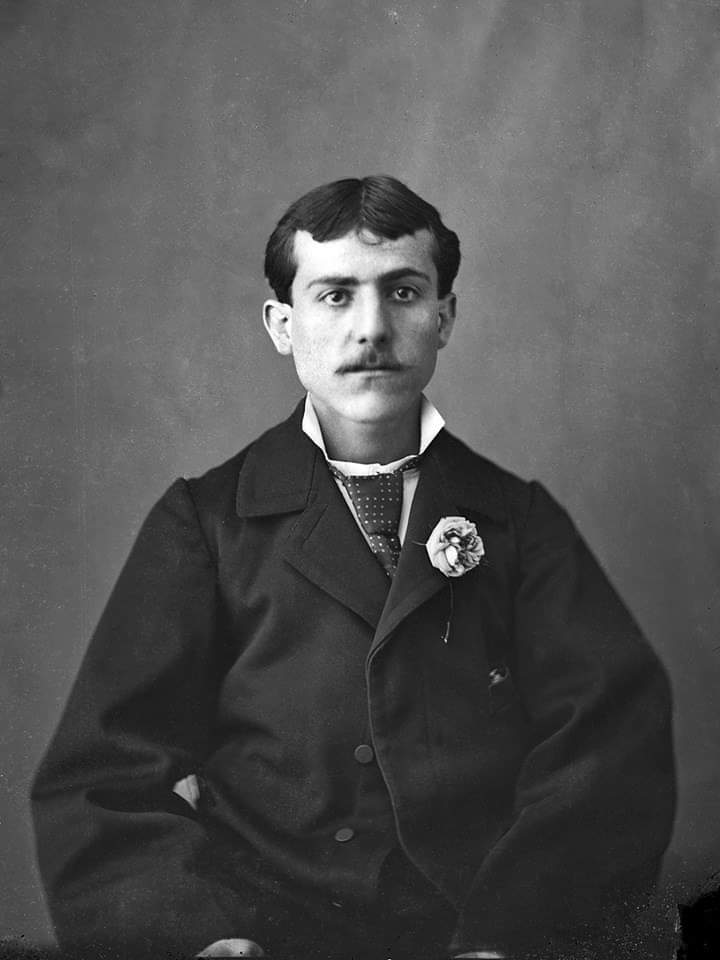
- Portrait of Kolë Idromeno, 1890s
- Born: Nikolla Kolë Idromeno; 15 August 1860; Shkodër, Ottoman Empire (now Albania)
- Died: 12 December 1939 (aged 79); Shkodër, Kingdom of Albania
- Education: Accademia di Belle Arti di Venezia in Venice, Kingdom of Italy
- Known for: Painting, sculpture, photography, architecture
- Notable work: Motra Tone
- Movement: Realism

Nikoll Idromeno (Greek: Νικόλαος Ιδρωμένος; Albanian pronunciation: [ˌniˈkɔɫa kɔl ˈidɾɔˌmɛnɔ]; 15 August 1860 – 12 December 1939), better known as Kolë Idromeno, was an Albanian painter, sculptor, architect, photographer, cinematographer, composer and engineer during the Albanian National Awakening in the nineteenth century. He is regarded as a precursor of both realism and landscape art in Albania, and as the country's greatest artist. He is also considered "the father of Albanian Renaissance painting".

Kolë Idromeno was born into a Cham family in Shkodër, which was at that time part of the Ottoman Empire. At age 16, he moved to Venice for six months and began his studies at the Accademia di Belle Arti di Venezia. Subsequently, he travelled throughout Europe and moved back to Shkodër and worked in a variety of artistic fields. He was committed to the Independence of Albania, which led to him being forced to emigrate to Ulcinj.

Among his important works are a series of paintings where he tried to depict the social aspects of everyday life, customs and religion exactly as it appears. He was distinguished for his rich use of colours and decorative shades with certain ethnographic elements and landscapes depicting places in or near Shkodër.

As an architect, he drew the plans for around fifty buildings either private and public. He also designed several industrial facilities, banks, the Rozafa cinema and Kafja e Madhe café. The coffered ceiling of the St. Stephen's Cathedral, which is one of the largest cathedrals in the Balkans, was also a design by Kolë Idromeno.

== Biography ==
=== Life ===
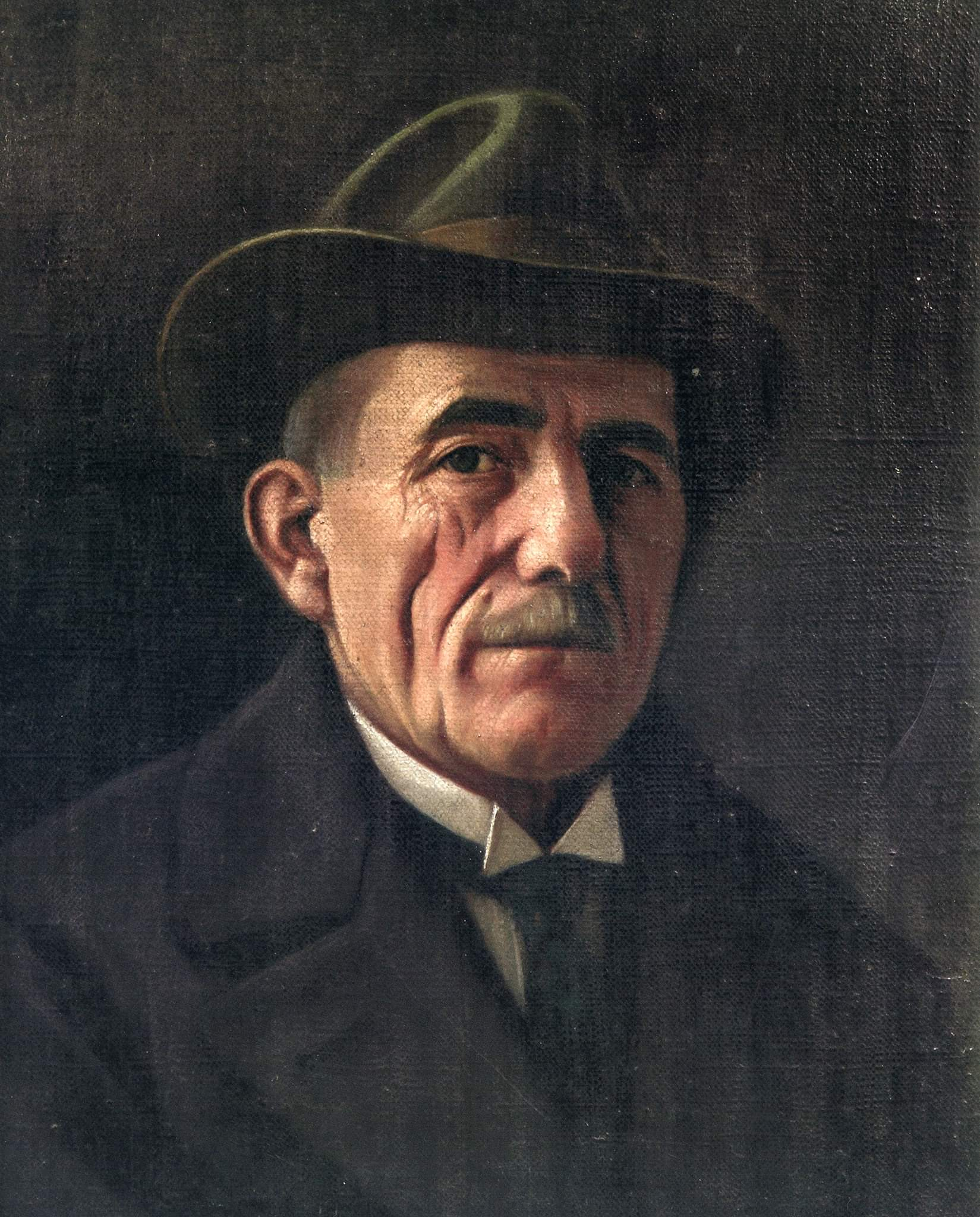
Self portrait of Kolë Idromeno.

Kolë Idromeno was of Cham origin and was born on 15 August 1860 in Shkodër. The Idromeno family were ethnic Chams who came from Parga, they went to settle in Corfu later on.

Pope Andrea Idromeno was a teacher in Corfu, he was the grandfather of Kolë. In Corfu he compiled and published the history of Parga and Souli, and also helped Grigor Gjirokastriti in translating the Gospel and the New Testament into the Albanian language with the Greek alphabet. Pope Andrea had two sons, Mihal who was a lawyer and Arsen, who was born in Corfu.

His father, Arsen Idromeno, in 1856 moved to Shkodër, where he practiced his trade as a carpenter and joiner, as well as a self-taught designer and implementer of private constructions in the city, such as the houses of the Lukaj family in Arra Madhe, Rokacollve in Serreq, the building of the Red Cross, the Illyricum lyceum and own house in Gjujadol.

He resided most of his lifetime in Shkodër, where he worked as a building contractor and married the local resident Roza Saraçi, the mother of Kolë. In his hometown Shkodër, Pjetër Marubi, a close friend of the family, gave Kolë lessons on photography and started at the age of eleven to paint his first paintings with watercolors. With the compulsion and support of Marubi, he moved to Venice and stayed for some months at the Accademia di Belle Arti di Venezia, the academy of fine arts. Afterwards, he worked in the studio of an Italian painter.

After his studies in Venice, he started to travel around Europe and decided to move back to his hometown in 1878. There, he engaged himself in a number of different activities, working in the fields of architecture, sculpture, photography, painting, composing, scenic design and engineering.

== Career ==
=== Work ===
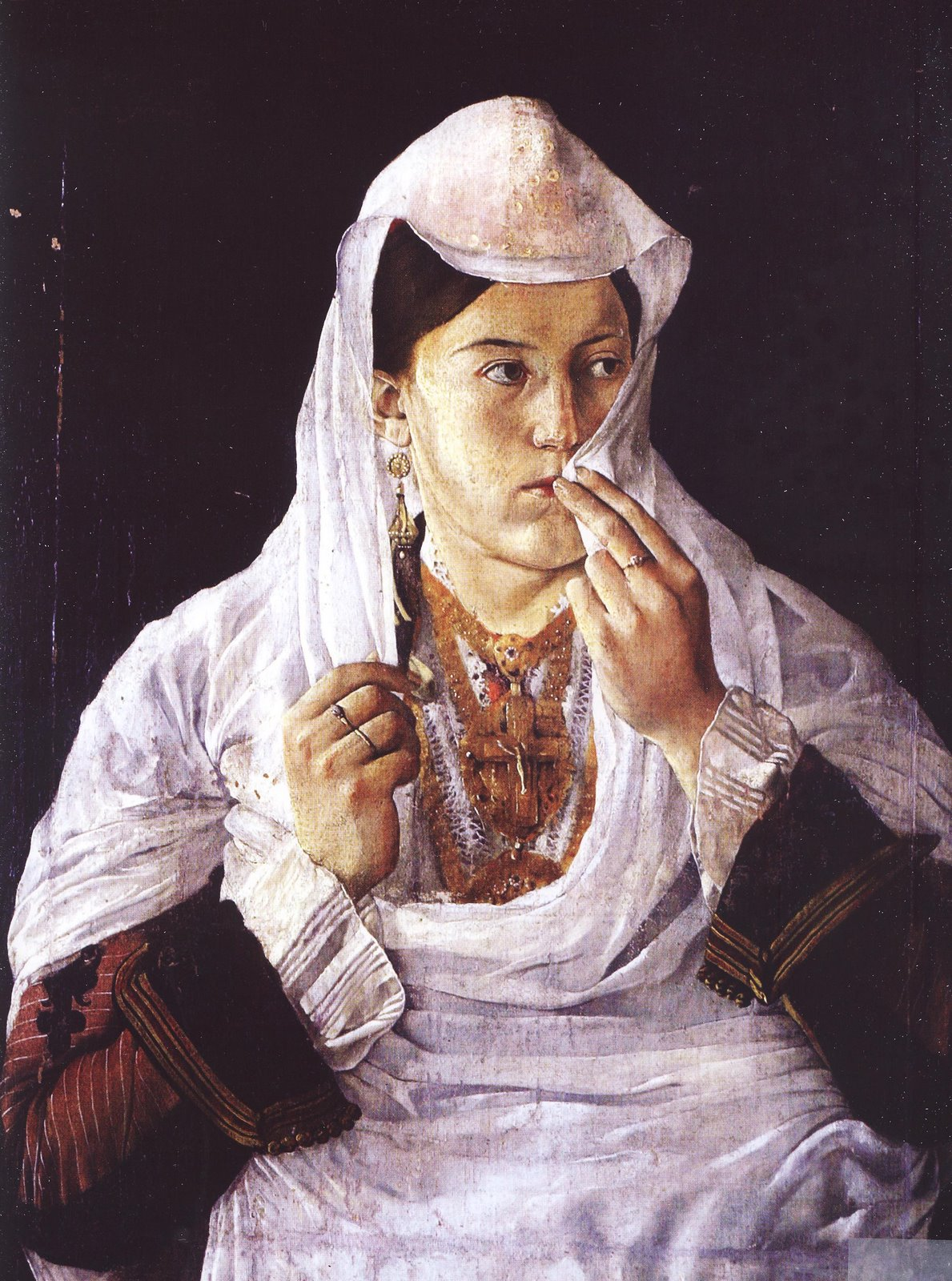
Motra Tone

Kolë Idromeno is considered as the founder of Realism in the country and the most important painter of the Albanian National Awakening, which started in the 19th century. He is referred as Michelangelo of Albania. Idromeno established photographic studio and was the first artist to show motion pictures in country in 1912. In addition, he had kept up a correspondence with the Lumière brothers in Paris. In 1923, Idromeno was the initiator of the first art exhibition in Shkodër and was represented in the first national art exhibition in Tirana in 1931.

Until 1896, Idromeno painted mainly paintings with religious themes. Afterwards, he painted probably the first Albanian secular and realistic pictures with illustrating historical events and everyday motifs such as festivals and costumes such as "Dasma Shkodrane". He went on to paint various landscapes, "Oborri i Shtëpisë Shkodrane", and became the first landscape painter of modern Albanian art. His most famous work is Motra Tone (English: "Our Sister"), which shows his sister. This artwork is sometimes referred to as the Albanian Mona Lisa. His works were represented in international exhibitions for example in Budapest, Austria-Hungary (1900) and New York City, United States (1939).

His portrait of Gjergj Kastriot Skënderbeu, painted in 1890, was included in the book 51 piktorë shqiptarë- Koleksioni Shehaj në historinë e pikturës shqiptare [51 Albanian Painters - The Shehaj Collection in the History of Albanian Painting] (2016), by Suzana Varvarica Kuka, based on the art collection of the Shehaj family.

As an architect, Idromeno designed many buildings in Shkodra. They include Kafja e Madhe, the St. Stephen's Cathedral, Church of Shirokë, the first electrical station in the town, Radovan Building, the Prefecture Building, Mosque of Parrucë and most of the residences of villas along the main boulevard in the northern historical district of Shkodra.

== See also ==
- Albanian art
- List of Albanian painters
- Motra Tone
