= Kel Marubi =

Albanian photographer

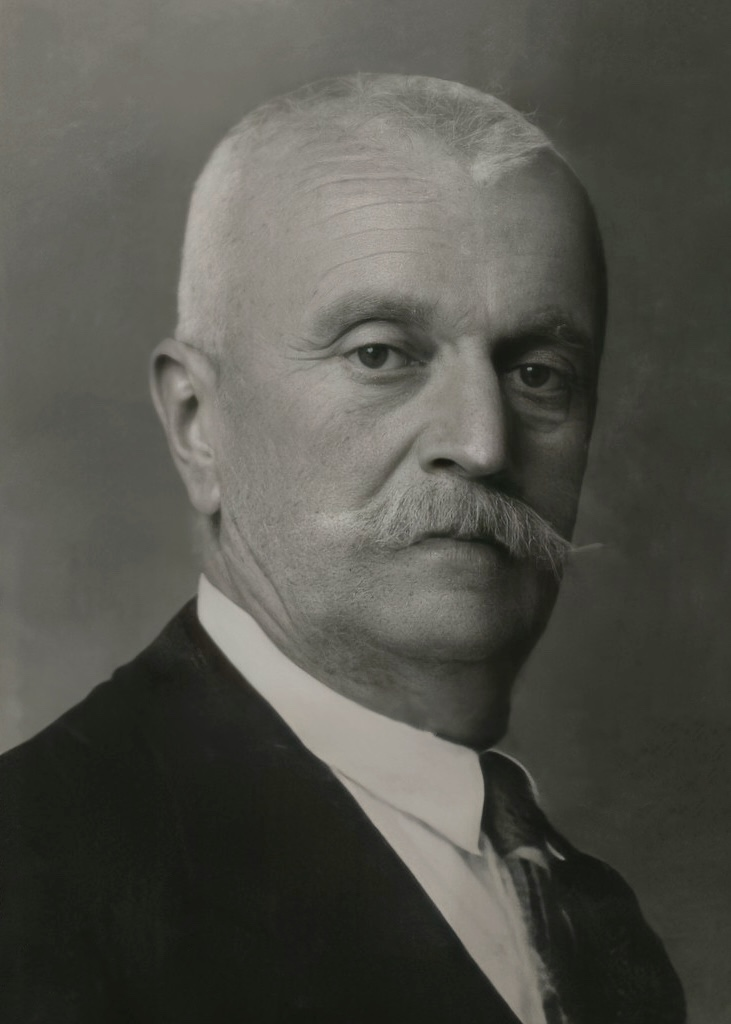
- Self portrait of Kel Marubi, 1930s
- Born: 1870; Shkodër, Ottoman Empire
- Died: March 13, 1940 (aged 69–70); Shkodër, Albania
- Known for: Photography
- Awards: Honor of the Nation

Kel Kodheli (better known as Kel Marubi) (1870 – 13 March 1940) was an Albanian photographer. He was the father of Geg Marubi.

== Life ==
Kel Kodheli began his study of photography at the age of 15. During the 1920s, he studied in Lyon at the first school of photography and cinema founded by the Lumière brothers, and worked as a professional photographer in Shkodra from the late 1920s to 1952. He pioneered working with celluloid instead of glass plate. Kel Kodheli was an assistant to Italian photographer Pietro Marubi. After Pietro's death, Kodheli changed his name to Kel Marubi and became the owner of Marubi's photography studio. He photographed the Albanian political leaders of the late nineteenth century and early twentieth century, as well as common people and landscapes. Kel was an ardent patriot and was active in the Albanian National Awakening, taking part in the foundation of many associations related to Albanian language, as well as publishing Voice of Shkodra newspaper in 1908.

Kel Marubi became well known abroad as well. He was invited to photograph the Royal Family of the King of Montenegro. In 1970, his entire estate of 150,000 negatives was purchased by the Government of Albania, to be conserved in the national archive.

Published photo albums of Marubi's work, include: "Gjurmë të Historisë Kombëtare në Shkodër" - Photograph Library ("Traces of National History in Shkodra"), 1982, and "By the Lumière", published in France. The first Albanian film school was named "Academy of Film and Multimedia Marubi", in honor of Marubi family and its work, as film and photography pioneers in western Balkans.

== Gallery ==
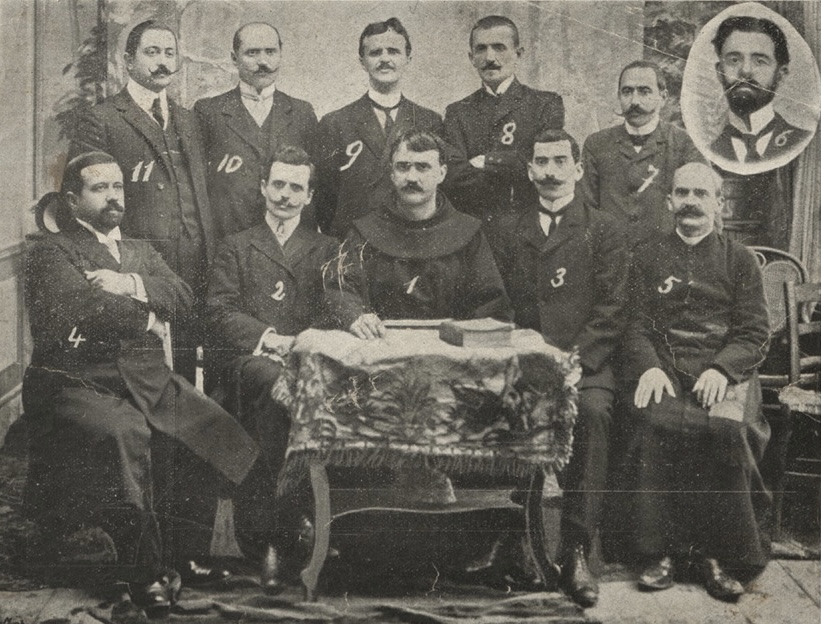
Congress of Monastir, 1908

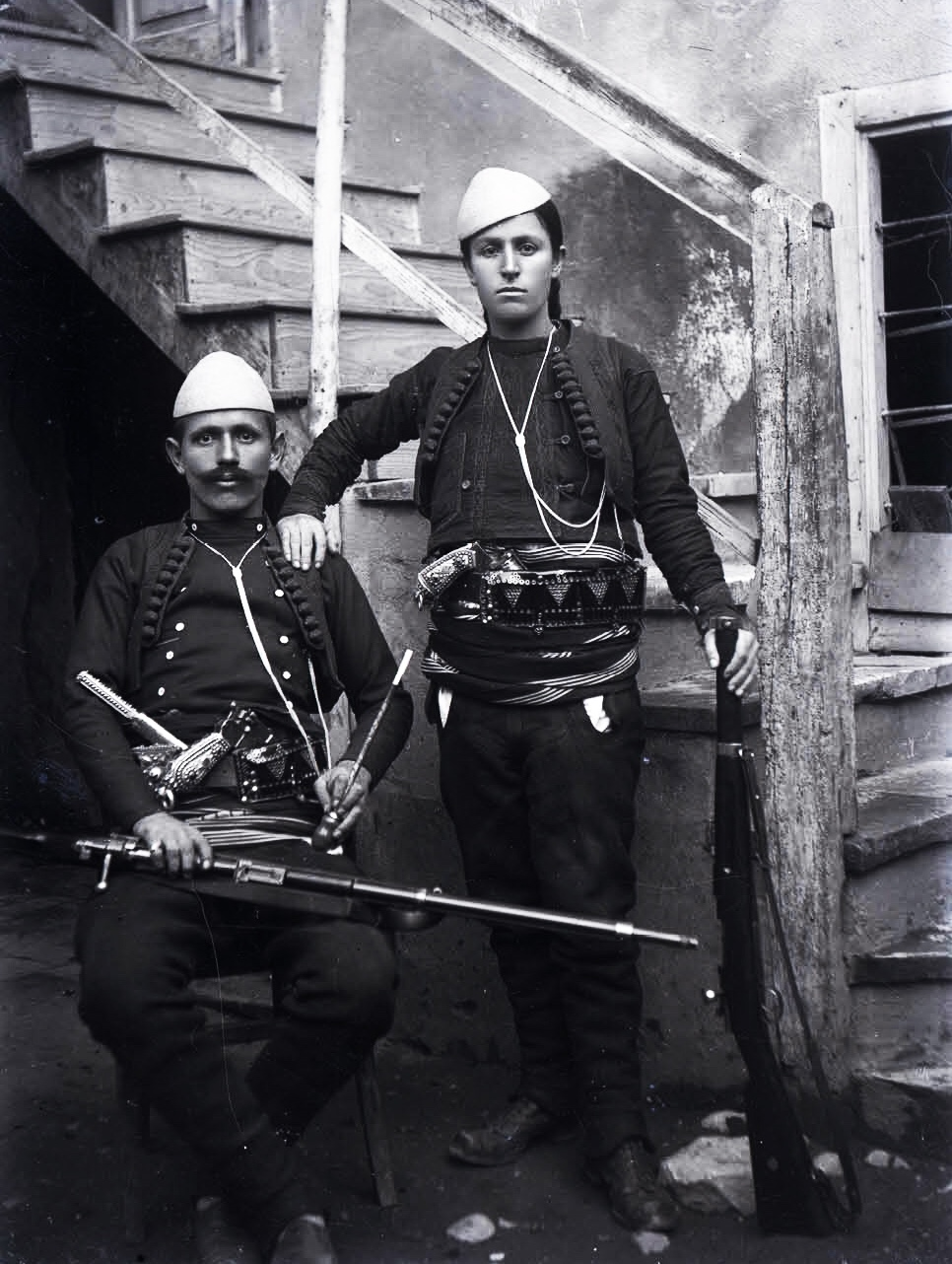
Azem and Shote Galica

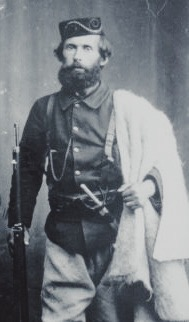
Mihal Grameno

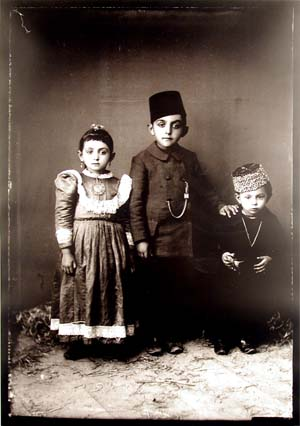
Children of Maliq Bushati
