= Geg Marubi =

Albanian photographer (1907–1984)

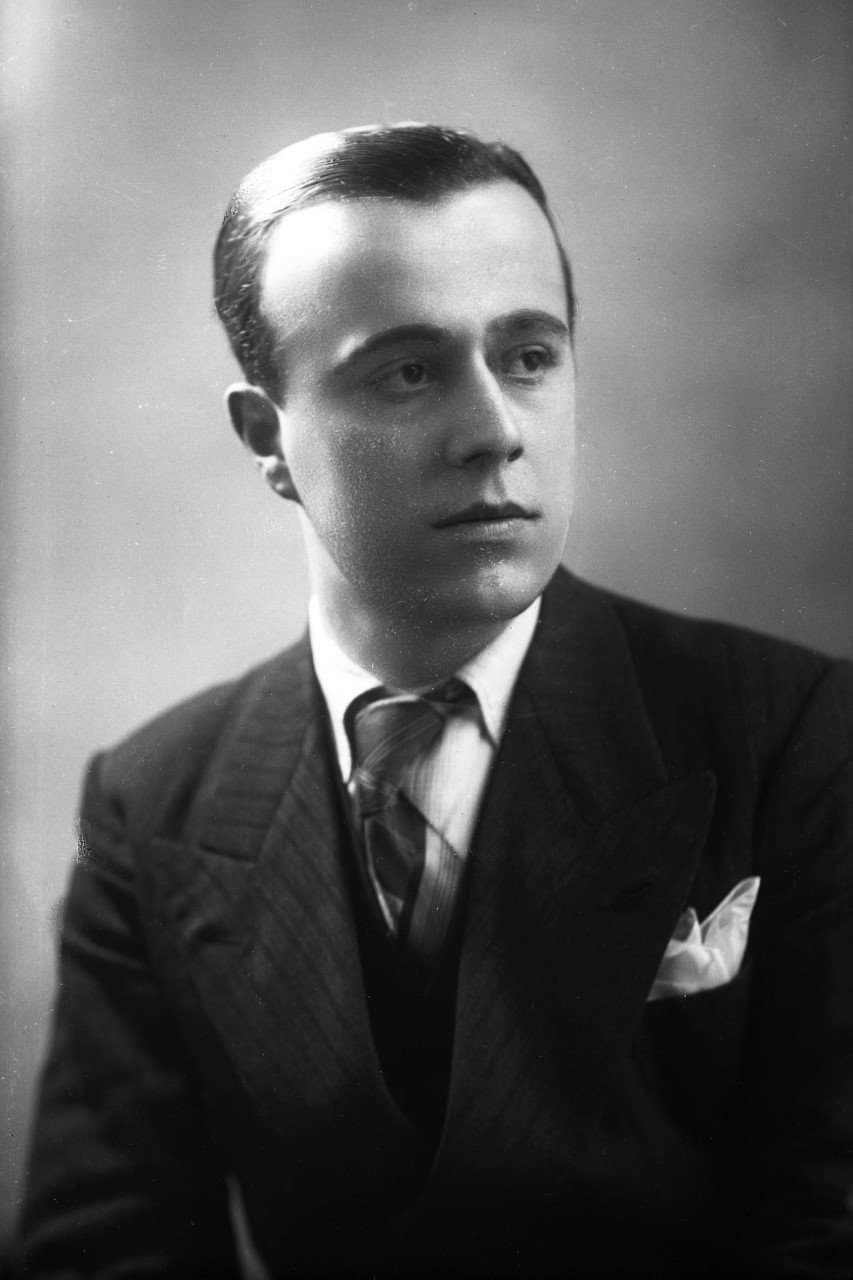
- Self portrait of Gegë Marubi, c. 1930s
- Born: May 9, 1907; Shkodër, Ottoman Empire
- Died: May 28, 1984 (aged 77); Shkodër, Albania
- Known for: Photography

Geg Marubi (9 May 1907 – 28 May 1984) was an Albanian photographer and son of Kel Marubi. He was the last photographer of his family and is regarded as one of the most prominent Balkan photographers of his generation.

== Life ==
Born in 1907 in Shkodër, in the 1920s he studied photography in the Lumière brothers' school. After his return to Albania the Marubi studio experienced the most success in its history. Marubi pioneered the use of celluloid instead of glass plates. During World War II his photographic activities were halted and after the war as private businesses were banned the studio was closed. In the 1970s he donated the studio's photographic collection consisting of 150.000 negatives to the directorate of general archives and worked for their preservation until his death in 1984.
