= Franz Benque =

German photographer (1841–1921)

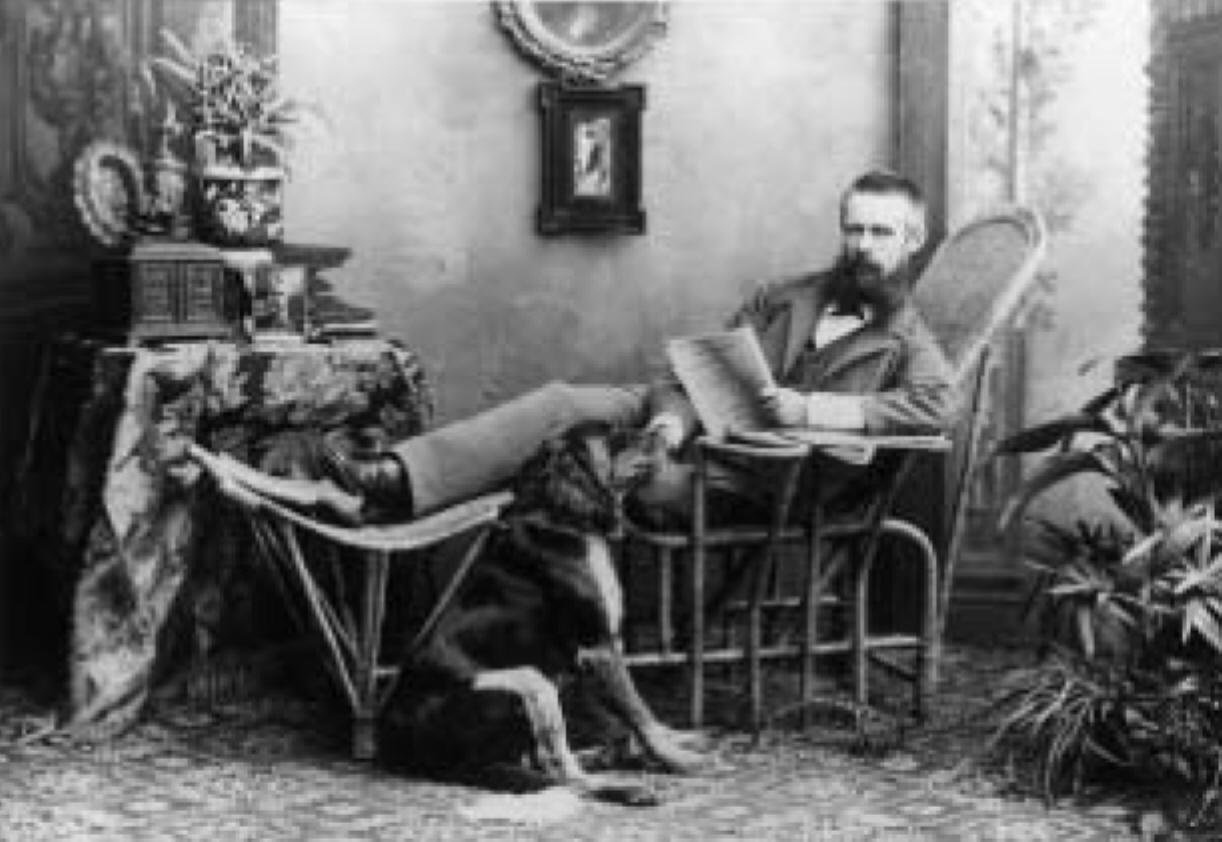
- Born: 12 March 1841; Ludwigslust, Germany
- Died: 30 March 1921 (aged 80); Trieste, Italy
- Known for: Photography
- Spouse: Isabella Sebastianutti

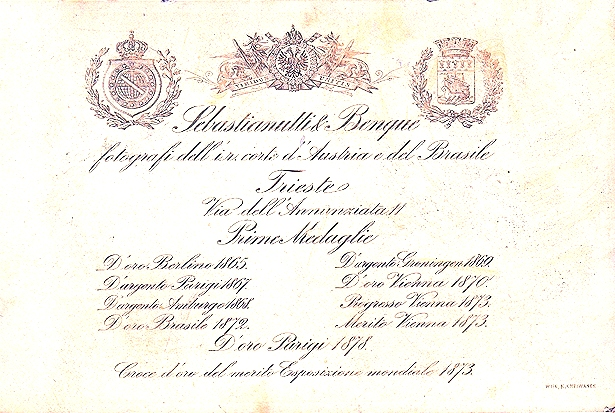
StudioSebastianutti & Benque

Franz Benque (12 March 1841 – 30 March 1921), known in Brazil as Francisco Benque, was a German photographer.

== Biography ==
Son of a professor, Benque was born in Ludwigslust, nowadays, a city located in the Ludwigslust-Parchim district in Mecklenburg-Vorpommern, (northern Germany). He received lessons of photography from C.C. Hersen before moving to the then Austrian city of Trieste in 1864, where he opened a studio in partnership with the Italian watchmaker Guglielmo Sebastianutti (1825–1881), marrying Sebastianutti's stepdaughter, Isabella, in 1868.

Despite being recognized by the local press and specialized organizations, receiving – among other things – a silver medal in the World Fair of Paris in 1867, Benque returned to (Germany) in 1869 and opened a studio with his cousin Conrad Kindermann in Hamburg.

One year later, in 1870, immigrated with his family to Brazil. With Alberto Henschel (1827–1882), a German from Berlin that migrated to Brazil in 1866, owner of the company Photographia Allemã (German Photography) with studios in Bahia and Pernambuco, Benque established the partnership Henschel & Benque Photographia Allemã that would become one of the most renowned Brazilian photography houses in that time.

In 1878 Benque returned to Trieste, Italy and continued to work with Mr. Sebastianutti. In 1903, he moved to the Austrian city of Villach, where he later died, in 1921.

== Bibliography ==
- Schiffer-Ekhart, Armgard: Sebastianutti & Benque. Fünf Fotografen. Vier Generationen. Drei Kontinente. [text of Barbara Schaukal]. catalog of the exposition, Graz, museum Steiermärkisches Landesmuseum Joanneum, 16.10.-13.11.1997.
- Karp Vasquez, Pedro: Fotografós Alemães no Brasil do Século XIX, Deutsche Fotografen des 19. Jahrhunderts in Brasilien, ed. Metalivros, published in 2000.
- Schwede, Sandra: Mit Licht und Tücke, Die Frühzeit der Photographie im Großherzogtum Mecklenburg-Schwerin (1839–1880), ed. Tectum Verlag, Marburg 2006, also: Universidade de Greifswald diss. 2006.
